= First cabinet of Donald Trump =

First Trump Cabinet
- Cabinet of the United States
- 2017–2021
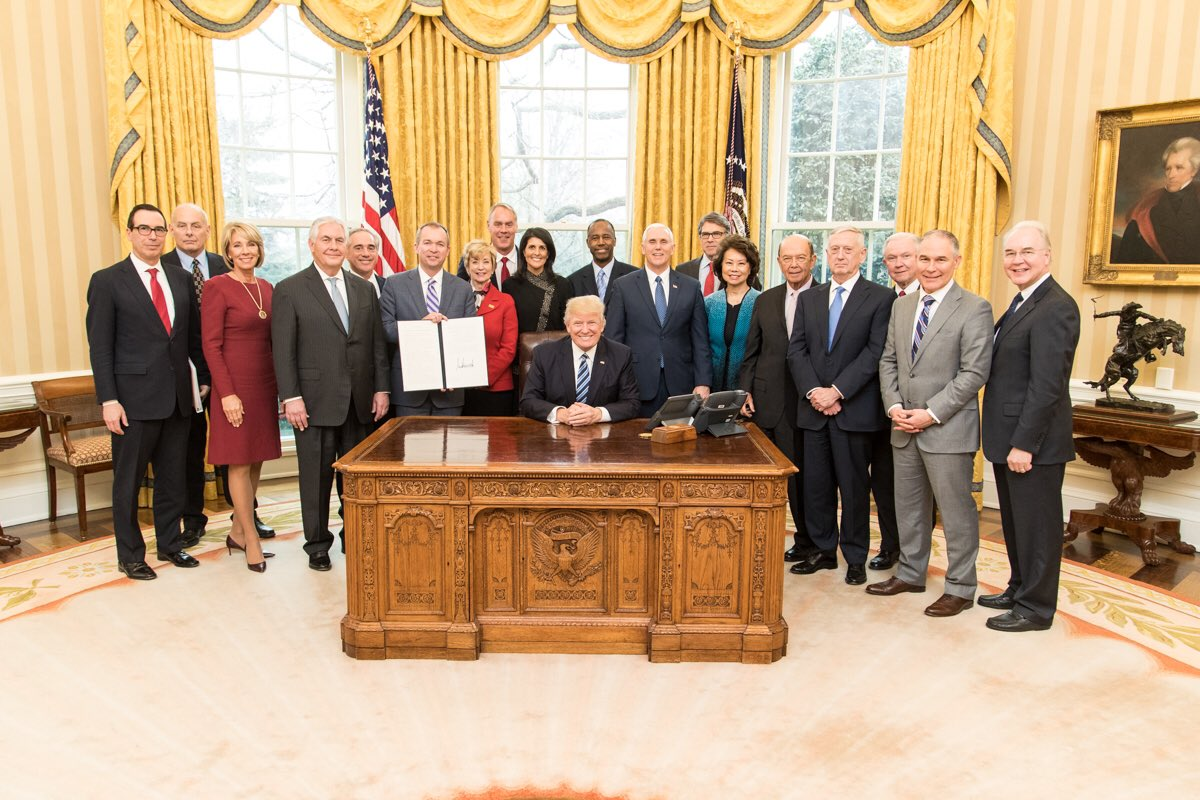
- The first cabinet of President Donald Trump in March 2017
- Date formed: January 20, 2017
- Date dissolved: January 20, 2021

People and organizations
- President: Donald Trump
- President's history: Chairman of The Trump Organization (1971–2017)
- Vice President: Mike Pence
- Member party: Republican Party
- Status in legislature: Majority government (2017–2019); Divided government (2019–2021)
- Opposition party: Democratic Party

History
- Election: 2016 presidential election
- Outgoing election: 2020 presidential election
- Legislature terms: 115th Congress; 116th Congress; 117th Congress (17 days)
- Budgets: 2017 budget 2018 budget 2019 budget 2020 budget
- Advice and consent: United States Senate
- Predecessor: Obama cabinet
- Successor: Biden cabinet

Donald Trump assumed office as the 45th president of the United States on January 20, 2017, and his first term ended on January 20, 2021. The president has the authority to nominate members of his cabinet to the United States Senate for confirmation under the Appointments Clause of the United States Constitution.

Before confirmation and during congressional hearings a high-level career member of an executive department heads this pre-confirmed cabinet on an acting basis. The cabinet's creation was part of the transition of power following the 2016 presidential election.

This article documents the nomination and confirmation process for any successful or unsuccessful cabinet nominees of the first Trump administration. They are listed in order of creation of the cabinet position (also used as the basis for the United States presidential line of succession).

== Cabinet ==
=== Cabinet officials on January 20, 2021 ===
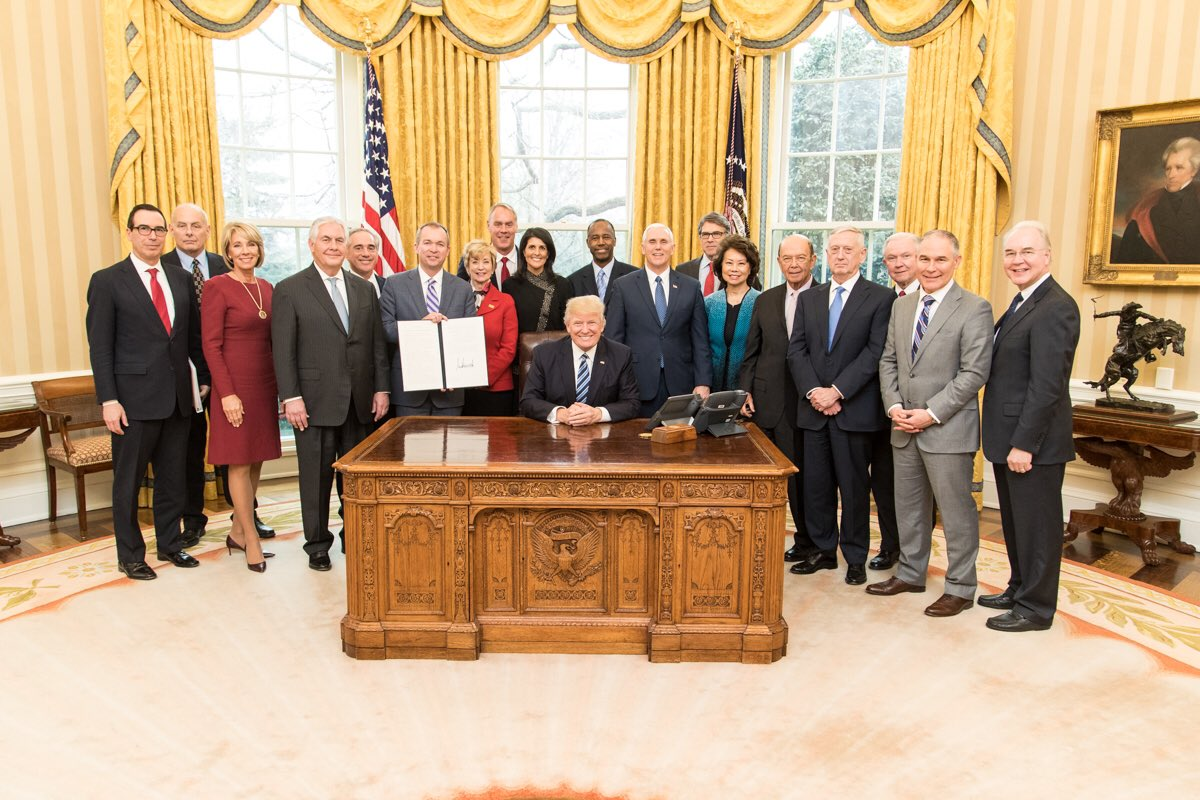

First Trump cabinet
Office	Name	Term
President	Donald Trump	2017–2021
Vice President	Mike Pence	2017–2021
Secretary of State	Rex Tillerson	2017–2018
Mike Pompeo	2018–2021
Secretary of the Treasury	Steven Mnuchin	2017–2021
Secretary of Defense	Jim Mattis	2017–2019
Mark Esper	2019–2020
Christopher C. Miller (acting)	2020–2021
Attorney General	Jeff Sessions	2017–2018
William Barr	2019–2020
Jeffrey A. Rosen (acting)	2020–2021
Secretary of the Interior	Ryan Zinke	2017–2019
David Bernhardt	2019–2021
Secretary of Agriculture	Sonny Perdue	2017–2021
Secretary of Commerce	Wilbur Ross	2017–2021
Secretary of Labor	Alexander Acosta	2017–2019
Eugene Scalia	2019–2021
Secretary of Health and Human Services	Tom Price	2017
Alex Azar	2018–2021
Secretary of Housing and Urban Development	Ben Carson	2017–2021
Secretary of Transportation	Elaine Chao	2017–2021
Secretary of Energy	Rick Perry	2017–2019
Dan Brouillette	2019–2021
Secretary of Education	Betsy DeVos	2017–2021
Secretary of Veterans Affairs	David Shulkin	2017–2018
Robert Wilkie	2018–2021
Secretary of Homeland Security	John F. Kelly	2017
Kirstjen Nielsen	2017–2019
Chad Wolf (acting)	2019–2021
Administrator of the Environmental Protection Agency	Scott Pruitt	2017–2018
Andrew Wheeler	2018–2021
Director of the Office of Management and Budget	Mick Mulvaney	2017–2020
Russell Vought	2020–2021
Director of National Intelligence	Dan Coats	2017–2019
John Ratcliffe	2020–2021
Director of the Central Intelligence Agency	Mike Pompeo	2017–2018
Gina Haspel	2018–2021
United States Trade Representative	Robert Lighthizer	2017–2021
Ambassador to the United Nations	Nikki Haley	2017–2018
Kelly Craft*	2019–2021
Administrator of the Small Business Administration	Linda McMahon	2017–2019
Jovita Carranza	2020–2021
White House Chief of Staff	Reince Priebus	2017
John F. Kelly	2017–2019
Mark Meadows	2020–2021
- *Lowered to non-cabinet position following Haley's exit in 2018

All permanent members of the cabinet of the United States as heads of executive departments require the advice and consent of the United States Senate following appointment by the president before taking office. The vice presidency is exceptional in that the position requires election to office pursuant to the United States Constitution. Although some are afforded cabinet-level rank, non-cabinet members within the Executive Office of the President, such as White House chief of staff, National Security Advisor, and White House press secretary, do not hold constitutionally created positions and most do not require Senate confirmation for appointment.

The following were the final members of President Donald Trump's first cabinet on January 20, 2021.

First cabinet of President Donald Trump
Elected to office – all other cabinet members serve at the pleasure of the president Serving in an acting capacity No Senate consent needed
Office Date announced / confirmed	Designee	Office Date announced / confirmed	Designee
– Vice President; Announced July 15, 2016; Elected November 8, 2016; Assumed office January 20, 2017	Governor; Mike Pence of Indiana	– Secretary of State; Announced March 13, 2018; Assumed office April 26, 2018	CIA Director; Mike Pompeo of Kansas
– Secretary of the Treasury; Announced November 30, 2016; Assumed office February 13, 2017	OneWest Bank CEO; Steven Mnuchin of California	– Secretary of Defense; Assumed acting office November 9, 2020	Director of the National Counterterrorism Center; Christopher C. Miller of Iowa
– Attorney General; Assumed acting office December 24, 2020	Deputy Attorney General; Jeffrey A. Rosen of Massachusetts	– Secretary of the Interior; Announced December 15, 2018; Assumed office January 2, 2019 (Note: Bernhardt served as Acting Secretary of the Interior from January 2, 2019 to April 11, 2019.)	Deputy Secretary; David Bernhardt of Virginia
– Secretary of Agriculture; Announced January 18, 2017; Assumed office April 25, 2017	Former Governor; Sonny Perdue of Georgia	– Secretary of Commerce; Announced November 30, 2016; Assumed office February 28, 2017	WL Ross & Co. CEO; Wilbur Ross of Florida
– Secretary of Labor; Announced July 18, 2019; Assumed office September 30, 2019	Former Solicitor; Eugene Scalia of Virginia	– Secretary of Health and Human Services; Announced November 13, 2017; Assumed office January 29, 2018	Former Deputy Secretary; Alex Azar of Indiana
– Secretary of Housing and Urban Development; Announced December 5, 2016; Assumed office March 2, 2017	Former neurosurgeon Ben Carson of Virginia	– Secretary of Transportation; Assumed acting office January 12, 2021	Acting Deputy Secretary; Steven G. Bradbury of Oregon
– Secretary of Energy; Announced November 7, 2019; Assumed office December 1, 2019 (Note: Brouillette served as Acting Secretary of Energy from December 1, 2019 to December 4, 2019.)	Deputy Secretary; Dan Brouillette of Texas	– Secretary of Education; Assumed acting office January 8, 2021	Deputy Secretary; Mick Zais of South Carolina
– Secretary of Veterans Affairs; Announced May 18, 2018; Assumed office July 30, 2018	Under Secretary; Robert Wilkie of North Carolina	– Secretary of Homeland Security; Assumed acting office January 12, 2021	FEMA Administrator; Pete Gaynor of Rhode Island
=== Cabinet-level officials ===
Office Date announced / confirmed	Designee	Office Date announced / confirmed	Designee
– White House Chief of Staff; Announced March 6, 2020; Assumed office March 31, 2020	U.S. Representative; Mark Meadows of North Carolina	– United States Trade Representative; Announced January 3, 2017; Assumed office May 15, 2017	Former Deputy Trade Representative; Robert Lighthizer of Florida
– Director of National Intelligence; Announced February 28, 2020; Assumed office May 26, 2020	U.S. Representative; John Ratcliffe of Texas	– Director of the Central Intelligence Agency; Announced March 13, 2018; Assumed office April 26, 2018 (Note: Haspel served as Acting Director of the Central Intelligence Agency from April 26, 2018 to May 21, 2018.)	Deputy CIA Director; Gina Haspel of Kentucky
– Administrator of the Environmental Protection Agency; Announced July 5, 2018; Assumed office July 9, 2018 (Note: Wheeler served as Acting Administrator of the Environmental Protection Agency from July 9, 2018 to February 28, 2019.)	Deputy EPA Administrator; Andrew R. Wheeler of Virginia	– Administrator of the Small Business Administration; Announced April 4, 2019; Assumed office January 14, 2020	Treasurer of the United States; Jovita Carranza of Illinois
– Director of the Office of Management and Budget; Announced January 2, 2019; Assumed office January 2, 2019 (Note: Vought served as Acting Director of the Office of Management and Budget from January 2, 2019 to July 22, 2020)	Deputy Director; Russell Vought of Virginia		

=== Confirmation process ===
==== Confirmation votes ====
For comparison,

Senate confirmation votes of President Donald Trump's first cabinet

State	Senator	Party	Jan 20, 2017 Jim Mattis Defense 98–1	Jan 20, 2017 John F. Kelly Homeland 88–11	Jan 23, 2017 Mike Pompeo CIA 66–32	Jan 24, 2017 Nikki Haley UN 96–4	Jan 31, 2017 Elaine Chao Transport 93–6	Feb 1, 2017 Rex Tillerson State 56–43	Feb 7, 2017 Betsy DeVos Education 51–50 (Note: Vice President Mike Pence provided the tie-breaking vote.)
Alabama	Jeff Sessions	R	No vote	No vote	Yea	Yea	Yea	Yea	Yea
Alabama	Richard Shelby	R	Yea	Yea	Yea	Yea	Yea	Yea	Yea
Alaska	Dan Sullivan	R	Yea	Yea	Yea	Yea	Yea	Yea	Yea
Alaska	Lisa Murkowski	R	Yea	Yea	Yea	Yea	Yea	Yea	Nay
Arizona	Jeff Flake	R	Yea	Yea	Yea	Yea	Yea	Yea	Yea
Arizona	John McCain	R	Yea	Yea	Yea	Yea	Yea	Yea	Yea
Arkansas	Tom Cotton	R	Yea	Yea	Yea	Yea	Yea	Yea	Yea
Arkansas	John Boozman	R	Yea	Yea	Yea	Yea	Yea	Yea	Yea
California	Dianne Feinstein	D	Yea	Yea	Yea	Yea	Yea	Nay	Nay
California	Kamala Harris	D	Yea	Nay	Nay	Yea	Yea	Nay	Nay
Colorado	Cory Gardner	R	Yea	Yea	Yea	Yea	Yea	Yea	Yea
Colorado	Michael Bennet	D	Yea	Yea	Nay	Yea	Yea	Nay	Nay
Connecticut	Chris Murphy	D	Yea	Yea	No vote	Yea	Yea	Nay	Nay
Connecticut	Richard Blumenthal	D	Yea	Nay	No vote	Yea	Yea	Nay	Nay
Delaware	Tom Carper	D	Yea	Yea	Nay	Yea	Yea	Nay	Nay
Delaware	Chris Coons	D	Yea	Yea	Nay	Nay	Yea	No vote	Nay
Florida	Bill Nelson	D	Yea	Yea	Nay	Yea	Yea	Nay	Nay
Florida	Marco Rubio	R	Yea	Yea	Yea	Yea	Yea	Yea	Yea
Georgia	David Perdue	R	Yea	Yea	Yea	Yea	Yea	Yea	Yea
Georgia	Johnny Isakson	R	Yea	Yea	Yea	Yea	Yea	Yea	Yea
Hawaii	Mazie Hirono	D	Yea	Yea	Nay	Yea	Yea	Nay	Nay
Hawaii	Brian Schatz	D	Yea	Yea	Yea	Yea	Yea	Nay	Nay
Idaho	Jim Risch	R	Yea	Yea	Yea	Yea	Yea	Yea	Yea
Idaho	Mike Crapo	R	Yea	Yea	Yea	Yea	Yea	Yea	Yea
Illinois	Dick Durbin	D	Yea	Yea	Nay	Yea	Yea	Nay	Nay
Illinois	Tammy Duckworth	D	Yea	Yea	Nay	Yea	Yea	Nay	Nay
Indiana	Joe Donnelly	D	Yea	Yea	Yea	Yea	Yea	Nay	Nay
Indiana	Todd Young	R	Yea	Yea	Yea	Yea	Yea	Yea	Yea
Iowa	Joni Ernst	R	Yea	Yea	Yea	Yea	Yea	Yea	Yea
Iowa	Chuck Grassley	R	Yea	Yea	Yea	Yea	Yea	Yea	Yea
Kansas	Pat Roberts	R	Yea	Yea	Yea	Yea	Yea	Yea	Yea
Kansas	Jerry Moran	R	Yea	Yea	Yea	Yea	Yea	Yea	Yea
Kentucky	Mitch McConnell	R	Yea	Yea	Yea	Yea	Present (Note: To maintain neutrality on the vote due to a conflict of interest—to avoid voting on his wife's confirmation.)	Yea	Yea
Kentucky	Rand Paul	R	Yea	Yea	Nay	Yea	Yea	Yea	Yea
Louisiana	Bill Cassidy	R	Yea	Yea	Yea	Yea	Yea	Yea	Yea
Louisiana	John Kennedy	R	Yea	Yea	Yea	Yea	Yea	Yea	Yea
Maine	Angus King	I-D	Yea	Yea	Yea	Yea	Yea	Yea	Nay
Maine	Susan Collins	R	Yea	Yea	Yea	Yea	Yea	Yea	Nay
Maryland	Ben Cardin	D	Yea	Yea	Nay	Yea	Yea	Nay	Nay
Maryland	Chris Van Hollen	D	Yea	Nay	Nay	Yea	Yea	Nay	Nay
Massachusetts	Elizabeth Warren	D	Yea	Nay	Nay	Yea	Nay	Nay	Nay
Massachusetts	Ed Markey	D	Yea	Yea	Nay	Yea	Yea	Nay	Nay
Michigan	Debbie Stabenow	D	Yea	Yea	Nay	Yea	Yea	Nay	Nay
Michigan	Gary Peters	D	Yea	Yea	Nay	Yea	Yea	Nay	Nay
Minnesota	Amy Klobuchar	D	Yea	Yea	Yea	Yea	Yea	Nay	Nay
Minnesota	Al Franken	D	Yea	Yea	Nay	Yea	Yea	Nay	Nay
Mississippi	Roger Wicker	R	Yea	Yea	Yea	Yea	Yea	Yea	Yea
Mississippi	Thad Cochran	R	Yea	Yea	Yea	Yea	Yea	Yea	Yea
Missouri	Claire McCaskill	D	Yea	Yea	Yea	Yea	Yea	Nay	Nay
Missouri	Roy Blunt	R	Yea	Yea	Yea	Yea	Yea	Yea	Yea
Montana	Jon Tester	D	Yea	Yea	Nay	Yea	Yea	Nay	Nay
Montana	Steve Daines	R	Yea	Yea	Yea	Yea	Yea	Yea	Yea
Nebraska	Deb Fischer	R	Yea	Yea	Yea	Yea	Yea	Yea	Yea
Nebraska	Ben Sasse	R	Yea	Yea	Yea	Yea	Yea	Yea	Yea
Nevada	Dean Heller	R	Yea	Yea	Yea	Yea	Yea	Yea	Yea
Nevada	Catherine Cortez Masto	D	Yea	Nay	Nay	Yea	Yea	Nay	Nay
New Hampshire	Jeanne Shaheen	D	Yea	Yea	Yea	Yea	Yea	Nay	Nay
New Hampshire	Maggie Hassan	D	Yea	Yea	Yea	Yea	Yea	Nay	Nay
New Jersey	Bob Menendez	D	Yea	Yea	Nay	Yea	Yea	Nay	Nay
New Jersey	Cory Booker	D	Yea	Nay	Nay	Yea	Nay	Nay	Nay
New Mexico	Martin Heinrich	D	Yea	Nay	Nay	Nay	Yea	Nay	Nay
New Mexico	Tom Udall	D	Yea	Nay	Nay	Nay	Yea	Nay	Nay
New York	Kirsten Gillibrand	D	Nay	Nay	Nay	Yea	Nay	Nay	Nay
New York	Chuck Schumer	D	Yea	Yea	Yea	Yea	Nay	Nay	Nay
North Carolina	Thom Tillis	R	Yea	Yea	Yea	Yea	Yea	Yea	Yea
North Carolina	Richard Burr	R	Yea	Yea	Yea	Yea	Yea	Yea	Yea
North Dakota	Heidi Heitkamp	D	Yea	Yea	Yea	Yea	Yea	Yea	Nay
North Dakota	John Hoeven	R	Yea	Yea	Yea	Yea	Yea	Yea	Yea
Ohio	Sherrod Brown	D	Yea	Yea	Nay	Yea	Yea	Nay	Nay
Ohio	Rob Portman	R	Yea	Yea	Yea	Yea	Yea	Yea	Yea
Oklahoma	Jim Inhofe	R	Yea	Yea	Yea	Yea	Yea	Yea	Yea
Oklahoma	James Lankford	R	Yea	Yea	Yea	Yea	Yea	Yea	Yea
Oregon	Jeff Merkley	D	Yea	Nay	Nay	Yea	Nay	Nay	Nay
Oregon	Ron Wyden	D	Yea	Nay	Nay	Yea	Yea	Nay	Nay
Pennsylvania	Bob Casey Jr.	D	Yea	Yea	Nay	Yea	Yea	Nay	Nay
Pennsylvania	Pat Toomey	R	Yea	Yea	Yea	Yea	Yea	Yea	Yea
Rhode Island	Sheldon Whitehouse	D	Yea	Yea	Yea	Yea	Yea	Nay	Nay
Rhode Island	Jack Reed	D	Yea	Yea	Yea	Yea	Yea	Nay	Nay
South Carolina	Lindsey Graham	R	Yea	Yea	Yea	Yea	Yea	Yea	Yea
South Carolina	Tim Scott	R	Yea	Yea	Yea	Yea	Yea	Yea	Yea
South Dakota	Mike Rounds	R	Yea	Yea	Yea	Yea	Yea	Yea	Yea
South Dakota	John Thune	R	Yea	Yea	Yea	Yea	Yea	Yea	Yea
Tennessee	Bob Corker	R	Yea	Yea	Yea	Yea	Yea	Yea	Yea
Tennessee	Lamar Alexander	R	Yea	Yea	Yea	Yea	Yea	Yea	Yea
Texas	Ted Cruz	R	Yea	Yea	Yea	Yea	Yea	Yea	Yea
Texas	John Cornyn	R	Yea	Yea	Yea	Yea	Yea	Yea	Yea
Utah	Orrin Hatch	R	Yea	Yea	Yea	Yea	Yea	Yea	Yea
Utah	Mike Lee	R	Yea	Yea	Yea	Yea	Yea	Yea	Yea
Vermont	Bernie Sanders	I-D	Yea	Yea	Nay	Nay	Nay	Nay	Nay
Vermont	Patrick Leahy	D	Yea	Yea	Nay	Yea	Yea	Nay	Nay
Virginia	Tim Kaine	D	Yea	Yea	Yea	Yea	Yea	Nay	Nay
Virginia	Mark Warner	D	Yea	Yea	Yea	Yea	Yea	Yea	Nay
Washington	Maria Cantwell	D	Yea	Yea	Nay	Yea	Yea	Nay	Nay
Washington	Patty Murray	D	Yea	Yea	Nay	Yea	Yea	Nay	Nay
West Virginia	Joe Manchin	D	Yea	Yea	Yea	Yea	Yea	Yea	Nay
West Virginia	Shelley Moore Capito	R	Yea	Yea	Yea	Yea	Yea	Yea	Yea
Wisconsin	Tammy Baldwin	D	Yea	Yea	Nay	Yea	Yea	Nay	Nay
Wisconsin	Ron Johnson	R	Yea	Yea	Yea	Yea	Yea	Yea	Yea
Wyoming	John Barrasso	R	Yea	Yea	Yea	Yea	Yea	Yea	Yea
Wyoming	Mike Enzi	R	Yea	Yea	Yea	Yea	Yea	Yea	Yea
	vote by party	R D Ind.	51–0 (1 NV); 45–1; 2–0; Mattis	51–0 (1 NV); 35–11; 2–0; Kelly	51–1; 14–30 (2 NV); 1–1; Pompeo	52–0; 43–3; 1–1; Haley	51–0 (1 Pres); 41–5; 1–1; Chao	52–0; 3–42 (1 NV); 1–1; Tillerson	50–2 (VP: Y); 0–46; 0–2; DeVos

State	Senator	Party	Feb 8, 2017 Jeff Sessions Justice 52–47	Feb 10, 2017 Tom Price Health 52–47	Feb 13, 2017 Steven Mnuchin Treasury 53–47	Feb 13, 2017 David Shulkin Veterans 100–0	Feb 14, 2017 Linda McMahon SBA 81–19	Feb 16, 2017 Mick Mulvaney OMB 51–49	Feb 17, 2017 Scott Pruitt EPA 52–46
Alabama	Jeff Sessions (Note: Sessions resigned after his confirmation as Attorney General.)	R	Present (Note: To maintain neutrality on the vote due to a conflict of interest—to avoid voting on his own confirmation.)	—					
Alabama	Luther Strange (Note: Appointed by Governor Robert J. Bentley to fill the vacancy after the resignation of Sessions.)	R	—	Yea	Yea	Yea	Yea	Yea	Yea
Alabama	Richard Shelby	R	Yea	Yea	Yea	Yea	Yea	Yea	Yea
Alaska	Dan Sullivan	R	Yea	Yea	Yea	Yea	Yea	Yea	Yea
Alaska	Lisa Murkowski	R	Yea	Yea	Yea	Yea	Yea	Yea	Yea
Arizona	Jeff Flake	R	Yea	Yea	Yea	Yea	Yea	Yea	Yea
Arizona	John McCain	R	Yea	Yea	Yea	Yea	Yea	Nay	No vote
Arkansas	Tom Cotton	R	Yea	Yea	Yea	Yea	Yea	Yea	Yea
Arkansas	John Boozman	R	Yea	Yea	Yea	Yea	Yea	Yea	Yea
California	Dianne Feinstein	D	Nay	Nay	Nay	Yea	Yea	Nay	Nay
California	Kamala Harris	D	Nay	Nay	Nay	Yea	Nay	Nay	Nay
Colorado	Cory Gardner	R	Yea	Yea	Yea	Yea	Yea	Yea	Yea
Colorado	Michael Bennet	D	Nay	Nay	Nay	Yea	Yea	Nay	Nay
Connecticut	Chris Murphy	D	Nay	Nay	Nay	Yea	Yea	Nay	Nay
Connecticut	Richard Blumenthal	D	Nay	Nay	Nay	Yea	Yea	Nay	Nay
Delaware	Tom Carper	D	Nay	Nay	Nay	Yea	Yea	Nay	Nay
Delaware	Chris Coons	D	Nay	Nay	Nay	Yea	Yea	Nay	Nay
Florida	Bill Nelson	D	Nay	Nay	Nay	Yea	Yea	Nay	Nay
Florida	Marco Rubio	R	Yea	Yea	Yea	Yea	Yea	Yea	Yea
Georgia	David Perdue	R	Yea	Yea	Yea	Yea	Yea	Yea	Yea
Georgia	Johnny Isakson	R	Yea	Yea	Yea	Yea	Yea	Yea	Yea
Hawaii	Mazie Hirono	D	Nay	Nay	Nay	Yea	Yea	Nay	Nay
Hawaii	Brian Schatz	D	Nay	Nay	Nay	Yea	Nay	Nay	Nay
Idaho	Jim Risch	R	Yea	Yea	Yea	Yea	Yea	Yea	Yea
Idaho	Mike Crapo	R	Yea	Yea	Yea	Yea	Yea	Yea	Yea
Illinois	Dick Durbin	D	Nay	Nay	Nay	Yea	Nay	Nay	Nay
Illinois	Tammy Duckworth	D	Nay	Nay	Nay	Yea	Yea	Nay	Nay
Indiana	Joe Donnelly	D	Nay	Nay	Nay	Yea	Yea	Nay	No vote
Indiana	Todd Young	R	Yea	Yea	Yea	Yea	Yea	Yea	Yea
Iowa	Joni Ernst	R	Yea	Yea	Yea	Yea	Yea	Yea	Yea
Iowa	Chuck Grassley	R	Yea	Yea	Yea	Yea	Yea	Yea	Yea
Kansas	Pat Roberts	R	Yea	Yea	Yea	Yea	Yea	Yea	Yea
Kansas	Jerry Moran	R	Yea	Yea	Yea	Yea	Yea	Yea	Yea
Kentucky	Mitch McConnell	R	Yea	Yea	Yea	Yea	Yea	Yea	Yea
Kentucky	Rand Paul	R	Yea	Yea	Yea	Yea	Yea	Yea	Yea
Louisiana	Bill Cassidy	R	Yea	Yea	Yea	Yea	Yea	Yea	Yea
Louisiana	John Kennedy	R	Yea	Yea	Yea	Yea	Yea	Yea	Yea
Maine	Angus King	I-D	Nay	Nay	Nay	Yea	Yea	Nay	Nay
Maine	Susan Collins	R	Yea	Yea	Yea	Yea	Yea	Yea	Yea
Maryland	Ben Cardin	D	Nay	Nay	Nay	Yea	Yea	Nay	Nay
Maryland	Chris Van Hollen	D	Nay	Nay	Nay	Yea	Nay	Nay	Nay
Massachusetts	Elizabeth Warren	D	Nay	Nay	Nay	Yea	Nay	Nay	Nay
Massachusetts	Ed Markey	D	Nay	Nay	Nay	Yea	Nay	Nay	Nay
Michigan	Debbie Stabenow	D	Nay	Nay	Nay	Yea	Yea	Nay	Nay
Michigan	Gary Peters	D	Nay	Nay	Nay	Yea	Yea	Nay	Nay
Minnesota	Amy Klobuchar	D	Nay	Nay	Nay	Yea	Yea	Nay	Nay
Minnesota	Al Franken	D	Nay	Nay	Nay	Yea	Yea	Nay	Nay
Mississippi	Roger Wicker	R	Yea	Yea	Yea	Yea	Yea	Yea	Yea
Mississippi	Thad Cochran	R	Yea	Yea	Yea	Yea	Yea	Yea	Yea
Missouri	Claire McCaskill	D	Nay	No vote	Nay	Yea	Yea	Nay	Nay
Missouri	Roy Blunt	R	Yea	Yea	Yea	Yea	Yea	Yea	Yea
Montana	Jon Tester	D	Nay	Nay	Nay	Yea	Yea	Nay	Nay
Montana	Steve Daines	R	Yea	Yea	Yea	Yea	Yea	Yea	Yea
Nebraska	Deb Fischer	R	Yea	Yea	Yea	Yea	Yea	Yea	Yea
Nebraska	Ben Sasse	R	Yea	Yea	Yea	Yea	Yea	Yea	Yea
Nevada	Dean Heller	R	Yea	Yea	Yea	Yea	Yea	Yea	Yea
Nevada	Catherine Cortez Masto	D	Nay	Nay	Nay	Yea	Yea	Nay	Nay
New Hampshire	Jeanne Shaheen	D	Nay	Nay	Nay	Yea	Yea	Nay	Nay
New Hampshire	Maggie Hassan	D	Nay	Nay	Nay	Yea	Yea	Nay	Nay
New Jersey	Bob Menendez	D	Nay	Nay	Nay	Yea	Yea	Nay	Nay
New Jersey	Cory Booker	D	Nay	Nay	Nay	Yea	Nay	Nay	Nay
New Mexico	Martin Heinrich	D	Nay	Nay	Nay	Yea	Nay	Nay	Nay
New Mexico	Tom Udall	D	Nay	Nay	Nay	Yea	Nay	Nay	Nay
New York	Kirsten Gillibrand	D	Nay	Nay	Nay	Yea	Nay	Nay	Nay
New York	Chuck Schumer	D	Nay	Nay	Nay	Yea	Nay	Nay	Nay
North Carolina	Thom Tillis	R	Yea	Yea	Yea	Yea	Yea	Yea	Yea
North Carolina	Richard Burr	R	Yea	Yea	Yea	Yea	Yea	Yea	Yea
North Dakota	Heidi Heitkamp	D	Nay	Nay	Nay	Yea	Yea	Nay	Yea
North Dakota	John Hoeven	R	Yea	Yea	Yea	Yea	Yea	Yea	Yea
Ohio	Sherrod Brown	D	Nay	Nay	Nay	Yea	Nay	Nay	Nay
Ohio	Rob Portman	R	Yea	Yea	Yea	Yea	Yea	Yea	Yea
Oklahoma	Jim Inhofe	R	Yea	Yea	Yea	Yea	Yea	Yea	Yea
Oklahoma	James Lankford	R	Yea	Yea	Yea	Yea	Yea	Yea	Yea
Oregon	Jeff Merkley	D	Nay	Nay	Nay	Yea	Nay	Nay	Nay
Oregon	Ron Wyden	D	Nay	Nay	Nay	Yea	Nay	Nay	Nay
Pennsylvania	Bob Casey Jr.	D	Nay	Nay	Nay	Yea	Yea	Nay	Nay
Pennsylvania	Pat Toomey	R	Yea	Yea	Yea	Yea	Yea	Yea	Yea
Rhode Island	Sheldon Whitehouse	D	Nay	Nay	Nay	Yea	Nay	Nay	Nay
Rhode Island	Jack Reed	D	Nay	Nay	Nay	Yea	Nay	Nay	Nay
South Carolina	Lindsey Graham	R	Yea	Yea	Yea	Yea	Yea	Yea	Yea
South Carolina	Tim Scott	R	Yea	Yea	Yea	Yea	Yea	Yea	Yea
South Dakota	Mike Rounds	R	Yea	Yea	Yea	Yea	Yea	Yea	Yea
South Dakota	John Thune	R	Yea	Yea	Yea	Yea	Yea	Yea	Yea
Tennessee	Bob Corker	R	Yea	Yea	Yea	Yea	Yea	Yea	Yea
Tennessee	Lamar Alexander	R	Yea	Yea	Yea	Yea	Yea	Yea	Yea
Texas	Ted Cruz	R	Yea	Yea	Yea	Yea	Yea	Yea	Yea
Texas	John Cornyn	R	Yea	Yea	Yea	Yea	Yea	Yea	Yea
Utah	Orrin Hatch	R	Yea	Yea	Yea	Yea	Yea	Yea	Yea
Utah	Mike Lee	R	Yea	Yea	Yea	Yea	Yea	Yea	Yea
Vermont	Bernie Sanders	I-D	Nay	Nay	Nay	Yea	Nay	Nay	Nay
Vermont	Patrick Leahy	D	Nay	Nay	Nay	Yea	Yea	Nay	Nay
Virginia	Tim Kaine	D	Nay	Nay	Nay	Yea	Yea	Nay	Nay
Virginia	Mark Warner	D	Nay	Nay	Nay	Yea	Yea	Nay	Nay
Washington	Maria Cantwell	D	Nay	Nay	Nay	Yea	Yea	Nay	Nay
Washington	Patty Murray	D	Nay	Nay	Nay	Yea	Nay	Nay	Nay
West Virginia	Joe Manchin	D	Yea	Nay	Yea	Yea	Yea	Nay	Yea
West Virginia	Shelley Moore Capito	R	Yea	Yea	Yea	Yea	Yea	Yea	Yea
Wisconsin	Tammy Baldwin	D	Nay	Nay	Nay	Yea	Nay	Nay	Nay
Wisconsin	Ron Johnson	R	Yea	Yea	Yea	Yea	Yea	Yea	Yea
Wyoming	John Barrasso	R	Yea	Yea	Yea	Yea	Yea	Yea	Yea
Wyoming	Mike Enzi	R	Yea	Yea	Yea	Yea	Yea	Yea	Yea
	vote by party	R D Ind.	51–0 (1 Pres); 1–45; 0–2; Sessions	52–0; 0–45 (1 NV); 0–2; Price	52–0; 1–45; 0–2; Mnuchin	52–0; 46–0; 2–0; Shulkin	52–0; 28–18; 1–1; McMahon	51–1; 0–46; 0–2; Mulvaney	51–0 (1 NV); 2–43 (1 NV); 0–2; Pruitt

State	Senator	Party	Feb 27, 2017 Wilbur Ross Commerce 72–27	Mar 1, 2017 Ryan Zinke Interior 68–31	Mar 2, 2017 Ben Carson HUD 58–41	Mar 2, 2017 Rick Perry Energy 62–37	Mar 15, 2017 Dan Coats Intelligence 85–12	Apr 24, 2017 Sonny Perdue Agriculture 87–11	Apr 27, 2017 Alex Acosta Labor 60–38
Alabama	Luther Strange	R	Yea	Yea	Yea	Yea	Yea	Yea	Yea
Alabama	Richard Shelby	R	Yea	Yea	Yea	Yea	Yea	Yea	Yea
Alaska	Dan Sullivan	R	Yea	Yea	Yea	Yea	Yea	Yea	Yea
Alaska	Lisa Murkowski	R	Yea	Yea	Yea	Yea	Yea	Yea	Yea
Arizona	Jeff Flake	R	Yea	Yea	Yea	Yea	Yea	No vote	Yea
Arizona	John McCain	R	Yea	Yea	Yea	Yea	Yea	Yea	Yea
Arkansas	Tom Cotton	R	Yea	Yea	Yea	Yea	Yea	Yea	Yea
Arkansas	John Boozman	R	Yea	Yea	Yea	Yea	Yea	Yea	Yea
California	Dianne Feinstein	D	Yea	Nay	Nay	Nay	Yea	Yea	Nay
California	Kamala Harris	D	Nay	Nay	Nay	Nay	Nay	Nay	Nay
Colorado	Cory Gardner	R	Yea	Yea	Yea	Yea	Yea	Yea	Yea
Colorado	Michael Bennet	D	Yea	Yea	Nay	Nay	Yea	Yea	Nay
Connecticut	Chris Murphy	D	Nay	Yea	Nay	Nay	Yea	Yea	Nay
Connecticut	Richard Blumenthal	D	Nay	Nay	Nay	Nay	Yea	Nay	Nay
Delaware	Tom Carper	D	Yea	Nay	Nay	Yea	Yea	Yea	Nay
Delaware	Chris Coons	D	Yea	Yea	Nay	Nay	Yea	Yea	Nay
Florida	Bill Nelson	D	Yea	Yea	Nay	Nay	Yea	Yea	Yea
Florida	Marco Rubio	R	Yea	Yea	Yea	Yea	Yea	Yea	Yea
Georgia	David Perdue	R	Yea	Yea	Yea	Yea	Yea	Present (Note: To maintain neutrality on the vote due to a conflict of interest—to avoid voting on his cousin's confirmation.)	Yea
Georgia	Johnny Isakson	R	No vote	No vote	No vote	No vote	No vote	Yea	Yea
Hawaii	Mazie Hirono	D	Nay	Nay	Nay	Nay	Yea	Yea	Nay
Hawaii	Brian Schatz	D	Yea	Nay	Nay	Nay	Yea	Yea	Nay
Idaho	Jim Risch	R	Yea	Yea	Yea	Yea	Yea	Yea	Yea
Idaho	Mike Crapo	R	Yea	Yea	Yea	Yea	Yea	Yea	Yea
Illinois	Dick Durbin	D	Nay	Nay	Nay	Nay	Yea	Yea	Nay
Illinois	Tammy Duckworth	D	Yea	Nay	Nay	Nay	Nay	Yea	Nay
Indiana	Joe Donnelly	D	Yea	Yea	Yea	Yea	Yea	Yea	Nay
Indiana	Todd Young	R	Yea	Yea	Yea	Yea	Yea	Yea	Yea
Iowa	Joni Ernst	R	Yea	Yea	Yea	Yea	Yea	Yea	Yea
Iowa	Chuck Grassley	R	Yea	Yea	Yea	Yea	Yea	Yea	Yea
Kansas	Pat Roberts	R	Yea	Yea	Yea	Yea	Yea	Yea	Yea
Kansas	Jerry Moran	R	Yea	Yea	Yea	Yea	Yea	Yea	Yea
Kentucky	Mitch McConnell	R	Yea	Yea	Yea	Yea	Yea	Yea	Yea
Kentucky	Rand Paul	R	Yea	Yea	Yea	Yea	Nay	Yea	Yea
Louisiana	Bill Cassidy	R	Yea	Yea	Yea	Yea	Yea	Yea	Yea
Louisiana	John Kennedy	R	Yea	Yea	Yea	Yea	Yea	Yea	Yea
Maine	Angus King	I-D	Yea	Yea	Yea	Yea	Yea	Yea	Yea
Maine	Susan Collins	R	Yea	Yea	Yea	Yea	Yea	Yea	Yea
Maryland	Ben Cardin	D	Nay	Nay	Nay	Nay	Yea	Yea	Nay
Maryland	Chris Van Hollen	D	Nay	Nay	Nay	Nay	Yea	Yea	Nay
Massachusetts	Elizabeth Warren	D	Nay	Nay	Nay	Nay	Nay	Nay	Nay
Massachusetts	Ed Markey	D	Nay	Nay	Nay	Nay	Nay	Nay	Nay
Michigan	Debbie Stabenow	D	Nay	Nay	Nay	Yea	Yea	Yea	Nay
Michigan	Gary Peters	D	Yea	Nay	Nay	Nay	Yea	Yea	No vote
Minnesota	Amy Klobuchar	D	Yea	Nay	Nay	Nay	Yea	Yea	Nay
Minnesota	Al Franken	D	Nay	Nay	Nay	Nay	Yea	Yea	Nay
Mississippi	Roger Wicker	R	Yea	Yea	Yea	Yea	Yea	Yea	Yea
Mississippi	Thad Cochran	R	Yea	Yea	Yea	Yea	Yea	Yea	Yea
Missouri	Claire McCaskill	D	Yea	Yea	Nay	Yea	Yea	Yea	Yea
Missouri	Roy Blunt	R	Yea	Yea	Yea	Yea	Yea	Yea	Yea
Montana	Jon Tester	D	Yea	Yea	Yea	Yea	Yea	Yea	Yea
Montana	Steve Daines	R	Yea	Yea	Yea	Yea	Yea	Yea	Yea
Nebraska	Deb Fischer	R	Yea	Yea	Yea	Yea	Yea	Yea	Yea
Nebraska	Ben Sasse	R	Yea	Yea	Yea	Yea	Yea	Yea	Yea
Nevada	Dean Heller	R	Yea	Yea	Yea	Yea	Yea	Yea	Yea
Nevada	Catherine Cortez Masto	D	Yea	Yea	Nay	Yea	Yea	Yea	Yea
New Hampshire	Jeanne Shaheen	D	Yea	Nay	Nay	Nay	Yea	Yea	Nay
New Hampshire	Maggie Hassan	D	Yea	Nay	Nay	Nay	Yea	Yea	Nay
New Jersey	Bob Menendez	D	Nay	Nay	Nay	Nay	Yea	Nay	Yea
New Jersey	Cory Booker	D	Nay	Nay	Nay	Nay	Nay	Nay	Nay
New Mexico	Martin Heinrich	D	Nay	Yea	Nay	Nay	Yea	Yea	Nay
New Mexico	Tom Udall	D	Nay	Yea	Nay	Yea	Nay	Yea	Nay
New York	Kirsten Gillibrand	D	Nay	Nay	Nay	Nay	Nay	Nay	Nay
New York	Chuck Schumer	D	Nay	Nay	Nay	Nay	Yea	Yea	Nay
North Carolina	Thom Tillis	R	Yea	Yea	Yea	Yea	Yea	Yea	Yea
North Carolina	Richard Burr	R	Yea	Yea	Yea	Yea	Yea	Yea	Yea
North Dakota	Heidi Heitkamp	D	Yea	Yea	Yea	Yea	Yea	Yea	Yea
North Dakota	John Hoeven	R	Yea	Yea	Yea	Yea	Yea	Yea	Yea
Ohio	Sherrod Brown	D	Yea	Yea	Yea	Nay	Yea	Yea	Nay
Ohio	Rob Portman	R	Yea	Yea	Yea	Yea	Yea	Yea	Yea
Oklahoma	Jim Inhofe	R	Yea	Yea	Yea	Yea	Yea	Yea	Yea
Oklahoma	James Lankford	R	Yea	Yea	Yea	Yea	Yea	Yea	Yea
Oregon	Jeff Merkley	D	Nay	Nay	Nay	Nay	Nay	Yea	Nay
Oregon	Ron Wyden	D	Nay	Yea	Nay	Nay	Nay	Nay	Nay
Pennsylvania	Bob Casey Jr.	D	Yea	Nay	Nay	Nay	Yea	Yea	Nay
Pennsylvania	Pat Toomey	R	Yea	Yea	Yea	Yea	Yea	Yea	No vote
Rhode Island	Sheldon Whitehouse	D	Nay	Nay	Nay	Nay	Yea	Nay	Nay
Rhode Island	Jack Reed	D	Nay	Nay	Nay	Nay	Yea	Nay	Nay
South Carolina	Lindsey Graham	R	Yea	Yea	Yea	Yea	Yea	Yea	Yea
South Carolina	Tim Scott	R	Yea	Yea	Yea	Yea	Yea	Yea	Yea
South Dakota	Mike Rounds	R	Yea	Yea	Yea	Yea	Yea	Yea	Yea
South Dakota	John Thune	R	Yea	Yea	Yea	Yea	Yea	Yea	Yea
Tennessee	Bob Corker	R	Yea	Yea	Yea	Yea	No vote	Yea	Yea
Tennessee	Lamar Alexander	R	Yea	Yea	Yea	Yea	No vote	Yea	Yea
Texas	Ted Cruz	R	Yea	Yea	Yea	Yea	Yea	Yea	Yea
Texas	John Cornyn	R	Yea	Yea	Yea	Yea	Yea	Yea	Yea
Utah	Orrin Hatch	R	Yea	Yea	Yea	Yea	Yea	Yea	Yea
Utah	Mike Lee	R	Yea	Yea	Yea	Yea	Yea	Yea	Yea
Vermont	Bernie Sanders	I-D	Nay	Nay	Nay	Nay	Nay	Nay	Nay
Vermont	Patrick Leahy	D	Nay	Nay	Nay	Nay	Yea	Yea	Nay
Virginia	Tim Kaine	D	Yea	Yea	Nay	Nay	Yea	Yea	Nay
Virginia	Mark Warner	D	Yea	Yea	Yea	Yea	Yea	Yea	Yea
Washington	Maria Cantwell	D	Nay	Nay	Nay	Nay	Yea	Yea	Nay
Washington	Patty Murray	D	Nay	Nay	Nay	Nay	Yea	Yea	Nay
West Virginia	Joe Manchin	D	Nay	Yea	Yea	Yea	Yea	Yea	Yea
West Virginia	Shelley Moore Capito	R	Yea	Yea	Yea	Yea	Yea	Yea	Yea
Wisconsin	Tammy Baldwin	D	Nay	Nay	Nay	Nay	Nay	Yea	Nay
Wisconsin	Ron Johnson	R	Yea	Yea	Yea	Yea	Yea	Yea	Yea
Wyoming	John Barrasso	R	Yea	Yea	Yea	Yea	Yea	Yea	Yea
Wyoming	Mike Enzi	R	Yea	Yea	Yea	Yea	Yea	Yea	Yea
	vote by party	R D Ind.	51–0 (1 NV); 20–26; 1–1; Ross	51–0 (1 NV); 16–30; 1–1; Zinke	51–0 (1 NV); 6–40; 1–1; Carson	51–0 (1 NV); 10–36; 1–1; Perry	48–1 (3 NV); 36–10; 1–1; Coats	50–0 (1 NV; 1 Pres); 36–10; 1–1; Perdue	51–0 (1 NV); 8–37 (1 NV); 1–1; Acosta

State	Senator	Party	May 11, 2017 Robert Lighthizer Trade 82–14	Dec 5, 2017 Kirstjen Nielsen Homeland 62–37	Jan 24, 2018 Alex Azar Health 55–43	Apr 26, 2018 Mike Pompeo State 57–42	May 17, 2018 Gina Haspel CIA 54–45	July 23, 2018 Robert Wilkie Veterans 86–9	Feb 14, 2019 William Barr Justice 54–45
Alabama	Luther Strange (Note: Strange did not receive the Republican nomination for the special election and was later replaced by Doug Jones—who won against the Republican nominee, Roy Moore, in the special election.)	R	Yea	Yea	—				
Alabama	Doug Jones (Note: Jones was elected in the special election to replace Strange for the remaining of the term.)	D	—		Yea	Yea	Nay	Yea	Yea
Alabama	Richard Shelby	R	Yea	Yea	Yea	Yea	Yea	Yea	Yea
Alaska	Dan Sullivan	R	No vote	Yea	Yea	Yea	Yea	Yea	Yea
Alaska	Lisa Murkowski	R	No vote	Yea	Yea	Yea	Yea	Yea	Yea
Arizona	Jeff Flake (Note: Flake retired and did not seek re-election in the 2018 Senate elections.)	R	Yea	Yea	Yea	Yea	Nay	Yea	—
Arizona	Kyrsten Sinema (Note: Sinema was elected in the 2018 Senate elections following her win against Republican nominee Martha McSally.)	D	—						Yea
Arizona	John McCain (Note: McCain died in office on August 25, 2018.)	R	Nay	Yea	No vote	No vote	No vote	No vote	—
Arizona	Martha McSally (Note: Appointed by Governor Doug Ducey to fill the vacancy in 2019 after the death of McCain and resignation of Kyl.)	R	—						Yea
Arkansas	Tom Cotton	R	Yea	Yea	Yea	Yea	Yea	Yea	Yea
Arkansas	John Boozman	R	Yea	Yea	Yea	Yea	Yea	Yea	Yea
California	Dianne Feinstein	D	Yea	Nay	Nay	Nay	Nay	Nay	Nay
California	Kamala Harris	D	Nay	Nay	Nay	Nay	Nay	Nay	Nay
Colorado	Cory Gardner	R	Nay	Yea	Yea	Yea	Yea	Yea	Yea
Colorado	Michael Bennet	D	Yea	Nay	Nay	Nay	Nay	Yea	Nay
Connecticut	Chris Murphy	D	Yea	Nay	Nay	Nay	Nay	Yea	Nay
Connecticut	Richard Blumenthal	D	Nay	Nay	Nay	Nay	Nay	Yea	Nay
Delaware	Tom Carper	D	Yea	Yea	Yea	Nay	Nay	Yea	Nay
Delaware	Chris Coons	D	Yea	Yea	Yea	Nay	Nay	Yea	Nay
Florida	Bill Nelson (Note: Nelson sought re-election to a fourth term in office, but was defeated by Republican nominee Rick Scott in the 2018 Senate elections.)	D	Yea	Yea	Nay	Yea	Yea	Yea	—
Florida	Rick Scott (Note: Scott was elected in the 2018 Senate elections following his win against incumbent Bill Nelson.)	R	—						Yea
Florida	Marco Rubio	R	Yea	Yea	Yea	Yea	Yea	Yea	Yea
Georgia	David Perdue	R	Yea	Yea	Yea	Yea	Yea	Yea	Yea
Georgia	Johnny Isakson	R	No vote	Yea	Yea	Yea	Yea	Yea	Yea
Hawaii	Mazie Hirono	D	Yea	Nay	Nay	Nay	Nay	Yea	Nay
Hawaii	Brian Schatz	D	Nay	Nay	Nay	Nay	Nay	Yea	Nay
Idaho	Jim Risch	R	Yea	Yea	Yea	Yea	Yea	Yea	Yea
Idaho	Mike Crapo	R	Yea	Yea	Yea	Yea	Yea	Yea	Yea
Illinois	Dick Durbin	D	Yea	Nay	Nay	Nay	Nay	Yea	Nay
Illinois	Tammy Duckworth	D	Yea	Nay	Nay	Nay	Nay	Yea	Nay
Indiana	Joe Donnelly (Note: Donnelly sought re-election to a second term in office, but was defeated by Republican nominee Mike Braun in the 2018 Senate elections.)	D	Yea	Yea	Yea	Yea	Yea	Yea	—
Indiana	Mike Braun (Note: Braun was elected in the 2018 Senate elections following his win against incumbent Joe Donnelly.)	R	—						Yea
Indiana	Todd Young	R	Yea	Yea	Yea	Yea	Yea	Yea	Yea
Iowa	Joni Ernst	R	Yea	Yea	Yea	Yea	Yea	Yea	Yea
Iowa	Chuck Grassley	R	Yea	Yea	Yea	Yea	Yea	Yea	Yea
Kansas	Pat Roberts	R	Yea	Yea	Yea	Yea	Yea	Yea	Yea
Kansas	Jerry Moran	R	Yea	Yea	Yea	Yea	Yea	Yea	Yea
Kentucky	Mitch McConnell	R	Yea	Yea	Yea	Yea	Yea	Yea	Yea
Kentucky	Rand Paul	R	Yea	Yea	Nay	Yea	Nay	Yea	Nay
Louisiana	Bill Cassidy	R	Yea	Yea	Yea	Yea	Yea	Yea	Yea
Louisiana	John Kennedy	R	Yea	Yea	Yea	Yea	Yea	No vote	Yea
Maine	Angus King	I-D	Yea	Yea	Yea	Yea	Nay	Yea	Nay
Maine	Susan Collins	R	Yea	Yea	Yea	Yea	Yea	Yea	Yea
Maryland	Ben Cardin	D	Yea	Nay	Nay	Nay	Nay	Yea	Nay
Maryland	Chris Van Hollen	D	Yea	Nay	Nay	Nay	Nay	Yea	Nay
Massachusetts	Elizabeth Warren	D	Nay	Nay	Nay	Nay	Nay	Nay	Nay
Massachusetts	Ed Markey	D	Nay	Nay	Nay	Nay	Nay	Nay	Nay
Michigan	Debbie Stabenow	D	Yea	Nay	Nay	Nay	Nay	Yea	Nay
Michigan	Gary Peters	D	Yea	Nay	Nay	Nay	Nay	Yea	Nay
Minnesota	Amy Klobuchar	D	Yea	Nay	Nay	Nay	Nay	Yea	Nay
Minnesota	Al Franken (Note: Franken resigned from his position after allegations of sexual misconduct were made against him.)	D	Yea	Nay	—				
Minnesota	Tina Smith (Note: Appointed by Governor Mark Dayton to fill the vacancy after the resignation of Franken.)	D	—		Nay	Nay	Nay	Yea	Nay
Mississippi	Roger Wicker	R	Yea	Yea	Yea	Yea	Yea	Yea	Yea
Mississippi	Thad Cochran (Note: Cochran resigned from his position due to health issues. He later died on May 30, 2019.)	R	Yea	Yea	Yea	—			
Mississippi	Cindy Hyde-Smith (Note: Appointed by Governor Phil Bryant to fill the vacancy after the resignation of Cochran.)	R	—			Yea	Yea	Yea	Yea
Missouri	Claire McCaskill (Note: McCaskill sought re-election to a third term in office, but was defeated by Republican nominee Josh Hawley in the 2018 Senate elections.)	D	Yea	Yea	Nay	Yea	Nay	Yea	—
Missouri	Josh Hawley (Note: Hawley was elected in the 2018 Senate elections following his win against incumbent Claire McCaskill.)	R	—						Yea
Missouri	Roy Blunt	R	Yea	Yea	Yea	Yea	Yea	Yea	Yea
Montana	Jon Tester	D	Yea	Yea	Nay	Nay	Nay	Yea	Nay
Montana	Steve Daines	R	Yea	Yea	Yea	Yea	Yea	Yea	Yea
Nebraska	Deb Fischer	R	Yea	Yea	Yea	Yea	Yea	Yea	Yea
Nebraska	Ben Sasse	R	Nay	Yea	Yea	Yea	Yea	Yea	Yea
Nevada	Dean Heller (Note: Heller sought re-election to a second term in office, but was defeated by Democratic nominee Jacky Rosen in the 2018 Senate elections.)	R	Yea	Yea	Yea	Yea	Yea	Yea	—
Nevada	Jacky Rosen (Note: Rosen was elected in the 2018 Senate elections following her win against incumbent Dean Heller.)	D	—						Nay
Nevada	Catherine Cortez Masto	D	Yea	Nay	Nay	Nay	Nay	Yea	Nay
New Hampshire	Jeanne Shaheen	D	Yea	Nay	Nay	Nay	Yea	Yea	Nay
New Hampshire	Maggie Hassan	D	Yea	Nay	Nay	Nay	Nay	Yea	Nay
New Jersey	Bob Menendez	D	Yea	Nay	Nay	Nay	Nay	Yea	Nay
New Jersey	Cory Booker	D	Yea	Nay	Nay	Nay	Nay	Nay	Nay
New Mexico	Martin Heinrich	D	Yea	Nay	Nay	Nay	Nay	Yea	Nay
New Mexico	Tom Udall	D	Yea	Nay	Nay	Nay	Nay	Yea	Nay
New York	Kirsten Gillibrand	D	Nay	Nay	Nay	Nay	Nay	Nay	Nay
New York	Chuck Schumer	D	Nay	Nay	Nay	Nay	Nay	Yea	Nay
North Carolina	Thom Tillis	R	Yea	Yea	Yea	Yea	Yea	Yea	Yea
North Carolina	Richard Burr	R	Yea	Yea	Yea	Yea	Yea	No vote	No vote
North Dakota	Heidi Heitkamp (Note: Heitkamp sought re-election to a second term in office, but was defeated by Republican nominee Kevin Cramer in the 2018 Senate elections.)	D	Yea	Yea	Yea	Yea	Yea	Yea	—
North Dakota	Kevin Cramer (Note: Cramer was elected in the 2018 Senate elections following his win against incumbent Heidi Heitkamp.)	R	—						Yea
North Dakota	John Hoeven	R	Yea	Yea	Yea	Yea	Yea	Yea	Yea
Ohio	Sherrod Brown	D	Yea	Nay	Nay	Nay	Nay	No vote	Nay
Ohio	Rob Portman	R	Yea	Yea	Yea	Yea	Yea	Yea	Yea
Oklahoma	Jim Inhofe	R	Yea	Yea	Yea	Yea	Yea	Yea	Yea
Oklahoma	James Lankford	R	Yea	Yea	Yea	Yea	Yea	Yea	Yea
Oregon	Jeff Merkley	D	Nay	Nay	Nay	Nay	Nay	Nay	Nay
Oregon	Ron Wyden	D	Yea	Nay	Nay	Nay	Nay	Nay	Nay
Pennsylvania	Bob Casey Jr.	D	Yea	Nay	Nay	Nay	Nay	Yea	Nay
Pennsylvania	Pat Toomey	R	Yea	Yea	Yea	Yea	Yea	Yea	Yea
Rhode Island	Sheldon Whitehouse	D	Nay	Nay	Nay	Nay	Nay	Yea	Nay
Rhode Island	Jack Reed	D	Nay	Nay	Nay	Nay	Nay	Yea	Nay
South Carolina	Lindsey Graham	R	Yea	Yea	Yea	Yea	Yea	Yea	Yea
South Carolina	Tim Scott	R	Yea	Yea	Yea	Yea	Yea	Yea	Yea
South Dakota	Mike Rounds	R	Yea	Yea	Yea	Yea	Yea	Yea	Yea
South Dakota	John Thune	R	Yea	Yea	Yea	Yea	Yea	Yea	Yea
Tennessee	Bob Corker (Note: Corker retired and did not seek re-election in the 2018 Senate elections.)	R	Yea	Yea	No vote	Yea	Yea	No vote	—
Tennessee	Marsha Blackburn (Note: Blackburn was elected in the 2018 Senate elections following her win against Democratic nominee Phil Bredesen.)	R	—						Yea
Tennessee	Lamar Alexander	R	Yea	No vote	Yea	Yea	Yea	Yea	Yea
Texas	Ted Cruz	R	Yea	Yea	Yea	Yea	Yea	Yea	Yea
Texas	John Cornyn	R	Yea	Yea	Yea	Yea	Yea	Yea	Yea
Utah	Orrin Hatch (Note: Hatch retired and did not seek re-election in the 2018 Senate elections.)	R	Yea	Yea	Yea	Yea	Yea	Yea	—
Utah	Mitt Romney (Note: Romney was elected in the 2018 Senate elections following his win against Democratic nominee Jenny Wilson.)	R	—						Yea
Utah	Mike Lee	R	Yea	Yea	Yea	Yea	Yea	Yea	Yea
Vermont	Bernie Sanders	I-D	Nay	Nay	Nay	Nay	Nay	Nay	Nay
Vermont	Patrick Leahy	D	Yea	Nay	Nay	Nay	Nay	Yea	Nay
Virginia	Tim Kaine	D	Yea	Nay	Nay	Nay	Nay	Yea	Nay
Virginia	Mark Warner	D	Yea	Yea	Nay	Nay	Yea	Yea	Nay
Washington	Maria Cantwell	D	Yea	Nay	Nay	Nay	Nay	Yea	Nay
Washington	Patty Murray	D	Yea	Nay	Nay	Nay	Nay	Yea	Nay
West Virginia	Joe Manchin	D	Yea	Yea	Yea	Yea	Yea	Yea	Yea
West Virginia	Shelley Moore Capito	R	No vote	Yea	Yea	Yea	Yea	Yea	Yea
Wisconsin	Tammy Baldwin	D	Yea	Nay	Nay	Nay	Nay	Yea	Nay
Wisconsin	Ron Johnson	R	Yea	Yea	Yea	Yea	Yea	Yea	Yea
Wyoming	John Barrasso	R	Yea	Yea	Yea	Yea	Yea	Yea	Yea
Wyoming	Mike Enzi	R	Yea	Yea	Yea	Yea	Yea	Yea	Yea
	vote by party	R D Ind.	45–3 (4 NV); 36–10; 1–1; Lighthizer	51–0 (1 NV); 10–36; 1–1; Nielsen	48–1 (2 NV); 6–41; 1–1; Azar	50–0 (1 NV); 6–41; 1–1; Pompeo	48–2 (1 NV); 6–41; 0–2; Haspel	47–0 (4 NV); 38–8 (1 NV); 1–1; Wilkie	51–1 (1 NV); 3–42; 0–2; Barr

State	Senator	Party	Feb 28, 2019 Andrew R. Wheeler EPA 52–47	Apr 11, 2019 David Bernhardt Interior 56–41	July 23, 2019 Mark Esper Defense 90–8	July 31, 2019 Kelly Craft UN (Note: The position was downgraded to a non-Cabinet position—prior to Craft's confirmation—on Dec. 31, 2018.) 56–34	Sept 26, 2019 Eugene Scalia Labor 53–44	Dec 2, 2019 Dan Brouillette Energy 70–15	Jan 7, 2020 Jovita Carranza SBA 88–5
Alabama	Doug Jones	D	Nay	Nay	Yea	Nay	Nay	No vote	Yea
Alabama	Richard Shelby	R	Yea	Yea	Yea	Yea	Yea	Yea	Yea
Alaska	Dan Sullivan	R	Yea	Yea	Yea	Yea	Yea	Yea	Yea
Alaska	Lisa Murkowski	R	Yea	Yea	Yea	Yea	Yea	Yea	Yea
Arizona	Kyrsten Sinema	D	No vote	Yea	Yea	Yea	Nay	Yea	Yea
Arizona	Martha McSally	R	Yea	Yea	Yea	Yea	Yea	Yea	Yea
Arkansas	Tom Cotton	R	Yea	Yea	Yea	Yea	Yea	Yea	Yea
Arkansas	John Boozman	R	Yea	Yea	Yea	Yea	Yea	Yea	Yea
California	Dianne Feinstein	D	Nay	Nay	Yea	Nay	Nay	Yea	Yea
California	Kamala Harris	D	Nay	No vote	Nay	No vote	Nay	No vote	Nay
Colorado	Cory Gardner	R	Yea	Yea	Yea	Yea	Yea	Yea	Yea
Colorado	Michael Bennet	D	Nay	Nay	Yea	No vote	Nay	No vote	Yea
Connecticut	Chris Murphy	D	Nay	Nay	Yea	Yea	Nay	Yea	Yea
Connecticut	Richard Blumenthal	D	Nay	Nay	Yea	Nay	Nay	Nay	Yea
Delaware	Tom Carper	D	Nay	Nay	Yea	Nay	Nay	Yea	Yea
Delaware	Chris Coons	D	Nay	Nay	Yea	No vote	Nay	Yea	Yea
Florida	Rick Scott	R	Yea	Yea	Yea	Yea	Yea	Yea	Yea
Florida	Marco Rubio	R	Yea	Yea	Yea	Yea	Yea	Yea	Yea
Georgia	David Perdue	R	Yea	No vote	Yea	Yea	Yea	Yea	No vote
Georgia	Johnny Isakson (Note: Isakson resigned from his position due to health issues. He died two years later on December 19, 2021.)	R	Yea	Yea	No vote	No vote	Yea	Yea	—
Georgia	Kelly Loeffler (Note: Appointed by Governor Brian Kemp to fill the vacancy after the resignation of Isakson.)	R	—						Yea
Hawaii	Mazie Hirono	D	Nay	Nay	Yea	Nay	Nay	Nay	Yea
Hawaii	Brian Schatz	D	Nay	Nay	Yea	Nay	Nay	Nay	Yea
Idaho	Jim Risch	R	Yea	Yea	Yea	Yea	Yea	Yea	Yea
Idaho	Mike Crapo	R	Yea	Yea	Yea	Yea	Yea	Yea	Yea
Illinois	Dick Durbin	D	Nay	Nay	Yea	Nay	Nay	Yea	Yea
Illinois	Tammy Duckworth	D	Nay	Nay	Yea	Nay	Nay	Yea	Yea
Indiana	Mike Braun	R	Yea	Yea	Yea	Yea	Yea	Yea	Yea
Indiana	Todd Young	R	Yea	Yea	Yea	Yea	Yea	Yea	Yea
Iowa	Joni Ernst	R	Yea	Yea	Yea	Yea	Yea	Yea	Yea
Iowa	Chuck Grassley	R	Yea	Yea	Yea	Yea	Yea	Yea	Yea
Kansas	Pat Roberts	R	Yea	Yea	Yea	Yea	Yea	Yea	Yea
Kansas	Jerry Moran	R	Yea	Yea	Yea	Yea	Yea	Yea	Yea
Kentucky	Mitch McConnell	R	Yea	Yea	Yea	Yea	Yea	Yea	Yea
Kentucky	Rand Paul	R	Yea	Yea	Yea	Yea	Yea	Yea	Yea
Louisiana	Bill Cassidy	R	Yea	Yea	Yea	Yea	Yea	Yea	Yea
Louisiana	John Kennedy	R	Yea	Yea	Yea	Yea	Yea	Yea	Yea
Maine	Angus King	I-D	Nay	Yea	Yea	Nay	Nay	Yea	Yea
Maine	Susan Collins	R	Nay	Yea	Yea	Yea	Yea	Yea	Yea
Maryland	Ben Cardin	D	Nay	Nay	Yea	Nay	Nay	Yea	No vote
Maryland	Chris Van Hollen	D	Nay	Nay	Yea	Nay	Nay	Nay	Yea
Massachusetts	Elizabeth Warren	D	Nay	Nay	Nay	No vote	No vote	No vote	No vote
Massachusetts	Ed Markey	D	Nay	Nay	Nay	Nay	Nay	Nay	Nay
Michigan	Debbie Stabenow	D	Nay	Nay	Yea	Nay	Nay	Yea	Yea
Michigan	Gary Peters	D	Nay	Nay	Yea	Nay	Nay	Yea	Yea
Minnesota	Amy Klobuchar	D	Nay	Nay	Nay	No vote	Nay	No vote	No vote
Minnesota	Tina Smith	D	Nay	Nay	Yea	Nay	Nay	Yea	Yea
Mississippi	Roger Wicker	R	Yea	Yea	Yea	Yea	Yea	Yea	Yea
Mississippi	Cindy Hyde-Smith	R	Yea	Yea	Yea	Yea	Yea	Yea	Yea
Missouri	Josh Hawley	R	Yea	Yea	Yea	Yea	Yea	Yea	Yea
Missouri	Roy Blunt	R	Yea	Yea	Yea	Yea	Yea	No vote	Yea
Montana	Jon Tester	D	Nay	Nay	Yea	Nay	Nay	Yea	Yea
Montana	Steve Daines	R	Yea	Yea	Yea	Yea	Yea	Yea	Yea
Nebraska	Deb Fischer	R	Yea	Yea	Yea	Yea	Yea	Yea	Yea
Nebraska	Ben Sasse	R	Yea	Yea	Yea	Yea	Yea	Yea	Yea
Nevada	Jacky Rosen	D	Nay	Nay	Yea	Nay	Nay	Nay	Yea
Nevada	Catherine Cortez Masto	D	Nay	Nay	Yea	Nay	Nay	Nay	Yea
New Hampshire	Jeanne Shaheen	D	Nay	Nay	Yea	Yea	Nay	Yea	Yea
New Hampshire	Maggie Hassan	D	Nay	Nay	Yea	Yea	Nay	Yea	Yea
New Jersey	Bob Menendez	D	Nay	Nay	Yea	Nay	Nay	Nay	Yea
New Jersey	Cory Booker	D	Nay	No vote	Nay	No vote	No vote	No vote	No vote
New Mexico	Martin Heinrich	D	Nay	Yea	Yea	Nay	Nay	Yea	Yea
New Mexico	Tom Udall	D	Nay	Nay	Yea	Nay	Nay	Yea	Yea
New York	Kirsten Gillibrand	D	Nay	Nay	Nay	No vote	Nay	No vote	Nay
New York	Chuck Schumer	D	Nay	Nay	Yea	Nay	Nay	Nay	Yea
North Carolina	Thom Tillis	R	Yea	Yea	Yea	Yea	Yea	Yea	Yea
North Carolina	Richard Burr	R	Yea	Yea	Yea	No vote	Yea	Yea	Yea
North Dakota	Kevin Cramer	R	Yea	Yea	Yea	Yea	Yea	Yea	Yea
North Dakota	John Hoeven	R	Yea	Yea	Yea	Yea	Yea	Yea	Yea
Ohio	Sherrod Brown	D	Nay	Nay	Yea	Nay	Nay	Nay	Yea
Ohio	Rob Portman	R	Yea	Yea	Yea	Yea	Yea	No vote	Yea
Oklahoma	Jim Inhofe	R	Yea	Yea	Yea	Yea	Yea	Yea	Yea
Oklahoma	James Lankford	R	Yea	Yea	Yea	Yea	Yea	Yea	Yea
Oregon	Jeff Merkley	D	Nay	Nay	Nay	Nay	Nay	Nay	Nay
Oregon	Ron Wyden	D	Nay	Nay	Nay	Nay	Nay	Nay	Nay
Pennsylvania	Bob Casey Jr.	D	Nay	Nay	Yea	Nay	Nay	Yea	Yea
Pennsylvania	Pat Toomey	R	Yea	Yea	Yea	Yea	Yea	No vote	Yea
Rhode Island	Sheldon Whitehouse	D	Nay	Nay	Yea	Nay	Nay	No vote	Yea
Rhode Island	Jack Reed	D	Nay	Nay	Yea	Nay	Nay	Nay	Yea
South Carolina	Lindsey Graham	R	Yea	Yea	Yea	Yea	Yea	No vote	Yea
South Carolina	Tim Scott	R	Yea	Yea	Yea	Yea	Yea	No vote	Yea
South Dakota	Mike Rounds	R	Yea	Yea	Yea	Yea	Yea	No vote	Yea
South Dakota	John Thune	R	Yea	Yea	Yea	Yea	Yea	Yea	Yea
Tennessee	Marsha Blackburn	R	Yea	Yea	Yea	Yea	Yea	Yea	Yea
Tennessee	Lamar Alexander	R	Yea	Yea	Yea	Yea	Yea	Yea	No vote
Texas	Ted Cruz	R	Yea	Yea	Yea	Yea	Yea	Yea	Yea
Texas	John Cornyn	R	Yea	Yea	Yea	Yea	Yea	Yea	Yea
Utah	Mitt Romney	R	Yea	Yea	Yea	Yea	Yea	Yea	Yea
Utah	Mike Lee	R	Yea	Yea	Yea	Yea	Yea	Yea	Yea
Vermont	Bernie Sanders	I-D	Nay	Nay	No vote	No vote	No vote	No vote	No vote
Vermont	Patrick Leahy	D	Nay	Nay	Yea	Nay	Nay	Nay	Yea
Virginia	Tim Kaine	D	Nay	Nay	Yea	Nay	Nay	Yea	Yea
Virginia	Mark Warner	D	Nay	Nay	Yea	Nay	Nay	Yea	Yea
Washington	Maria Cantwell	D	Nay	Nay	Yea	Nay	Nay	Yea	Yea
Washington	Patty Murray	D	Nay	Nay	Yea	Nay	Nay	Yea	Yea
West Virginia	Joe Manchin	D	Nay	Yea	Yea	Yea	Nay	Yea	Yea
West Virginia	Shelley Moore Capito	R	Yea	Yea	Yea	Yea	Yea	Yea	Yea
Wisconsin	Tammy Baldwin	D	Nay	Nay	Yea	Nay	Nay	Nay	Yea
Wisconsin	Ron Johnson	R	Yea	Yea	Yea	Yea	Yea	Yea	Yea
Wyoming	John Barrasso	R	Yea	Yea	Yea	Yea	Yea	Yea	Yea
Wyoming	Mike Enzi	R	Yea	Yea	Yea	Yea	Yea	Yea	Yea
	vote by party	R D Ind.	52–1; 0–44 (1 NV); 0–2; Wheeler	52–0 (1 NV); 3–40 (2 NV); 1–1; Bernhardt	52–0 (1 NV); 37–8; 1–0 (1 NV); Esper	51–0 (2 NV); 5–33 (7 NV); 0–1 (1 NV); Craft	53–0; 0–43 (2 NV); 0–1 (1 NV); Scalia	47–0 (6 NV); 22–15 (8 NV); 1–0 (1 NV); Brouillette	51–0 (2 NV); 36–5 (4 NV); 1–0 (1 NV); Carranza

State	Senator	Party	May 21, 2020 John Ratcliffe Intelligence 49–44	July 20, 2020 Russell Vought OMB 51–45	Summary of votes cast by senators				
State	Senator	Party	May 21, 2020 John Ratcliffe Intelligence 49–44	July 20, 2020 Russell Vought OMB 51–45	Congress	Yea	Did not vote	Nay	Present
Alabama	Jeff Sessions	R	—		115th	5	2	0	1
Alabama	Luther Strange	R	—		115th	15	0	0	0
Alabama	Doug Jones	D	Nay	Nay	115th｜116th	6	1	7	0
Alabama	Richard Shelby	R	Yea	Yea	115th｜116th	37	0	0	0
Alaska	Dan Sullivan	R	Yea	Yea	115th｜116th	36	1	0	0
Alaska	Lisa Murkowski	R	No vote	Yea	115th｜116th	34	2	1	0
Arizona	Jeff Flake	R	—		115th	25	1	1	0
Arizona	Kyrsten Sinema	D	Nay	Nay	116th	6	1	3	0
Arizona	John McCain	R	—		115th	20	5	2	0
Arizona	Martha McSally	R	Yea	Yea	116th	10	0	0	0
Arkansas	Tom Cotton	R	Yea	Yea	115th｜116th	37	0	0	0
Arkansas	John Boozman	R	Yea	Yea	115th｜116th	37	0	0	0
California	Dianne Feinstein	D	Nay	Nay	115th｜116th	14	0	23	0
California	Kamala Harris	D	Nay	Nay	115th｜116th	4	3	30	0
Colorado	Cory Gardner	R	Yea	Yea	115th｜116th	36	0	1	0
Colorado	Michael Bennet	D	Nay	Nay	115th｜116th	14	2	21	0
Connecticut	Chris Murphy	D	Nay	Nay	115th｜116th	15	1	21	0
Connecticut	Richard Blumenthal	D	Nay	Nay	115th｜116th	9	1	27	0
Delaware	Tom Carper	D	Nay	Nay	115th｜116th	17	0	20	0
Delaware	Chris Coons	D	Nay	Nay	115th｜116th	16	2	19	0
Florida	Bill Nelson	D	—		115th	16	0	11	0
Florida	Rick Scott	R	Yea	Yea	116th	10	0	0	0
Florida	Marco Rubio	R	Yea	Yea	115th｜116th	37	0	0	0
Georgia	David Perdue	R	Yea	Yea	115th｜116th	34	2	0	1
Georgia	Johnny Isakson	R	—		115th｜116th	26	8	0	0
Georgia	Kelly Loeffler	R	Yea	Yea	116th	3	0	0	0
Hawaii	Mazie Hirono	D	Nay	Nay	115th｜116th	12	0	25	0
Hawaii	Brian Schatz	D	Nay	No vote	115th｜116th	12	1	24	0
Idaho	Jim Risch	R	Yea	Yea	115th｜116th	37	0	0	0
Idaho	Mike Crapo	R	Yea	Yea	115th｜116th	37	0	0	0
Illinois	Dick Durbin	D	Nay	Nay	115th｜116th	12	0	25	0
Illinois	Tammy Duckworth	D	Nay	Nay	115th｜116th	13	0	24	0
Indiana	Joe Donnelly	D	—		115th	19	1	7	0
Indiana	Mike Braun	R	Yea	No vote	116th	9	1	0	0
Indiana	Todd Young	R	Yea	Yea	115th｜116th	37	0	0	0
Iowa	Joni Ernst	R	Yea	Yea	115th｜116th	37	0	0	0
Iowa	Chuck Grassley	R	Yea	Yea	115th｜116th	37	0	0	0
Kansas	Pat Roberts	R	Yea	Yea	115th｜116th	37	0	0	0
Kansas	Jerry Moran	R	Yea	Yea	115th｜116th	37	0	0	0
Kentucky	Mitch McConnell	R	Yea	Yea	115th｜116th	36	0	0	1
Kentucky	Rand Paul	R	Yea	Yea	115th｜116th	32	0	5	0
Louisiana	Bill Cassidy	R	Yea	Yea	115th｜116th	37	0	0	0
Louisiana	John Kennedy	R	Yea	Yea	115th｜116th	36	1	0	0
Maine	Angus King	I-D	Nay	Nay	115th｜116th	24	0	13	0
Maine	Susan Collins	R	Yea	Yea	115th｜116th	35	0	2	0
Maryland	Ben Cardin	D	Nay	Nay	115th｜116th	12	1	24	0
Maryland	Chris Van Hollen	D	Nay	Nay	115th｜116th	10	0	27	0
Massachusetts	Elizabeth Warren	D	Nay	Nay	115th｜116th	3	4	30	0
Massachusetts	Ed Markey	D	No vote	Nay	115th｜116th	5	1	31	0
Michigan	Debbie Stabenow	D	Nay	Nay	115th｜116th	14	0	23	0
Michigan	Gary Peters	D	Nay	Nay	115th｜116th	14	1	22	0
Minnesota	Amy Klobuchar	D	Nay	Nay	115th｜116th	12	3	22	0
Minnesota	Al Franken	D	—		115th	9	0	14	0
Minnesota	Tina Smith	D	Nay	Nay	115th｜116th	4	0	10	0
Mississippi	Roger Wicker	R	Yea	Yea	115th｜116th	37	0	0	0
Mississippi	Thad Cochran	R	—		115th	24	0	0	0
Mississippi	Cindy Hyde-Smith	R	Yea	Yea	115th｜116th	13	0	0	0
Missouri	Claire McCaskill	D	—		115th	17	1	9	0
Missouri	Josh Hawley	R	Yea	Yea	116th	10	0	0	0
Missouri	Roy Blunt	R	Yea	Yea	115th｜116th	36	1	0	0
Montana	Jon Tester	D	Nay	Nay	115th｜116th	19	0	18	0
Montana	Steve Daines	R	Yea	Yea	115th｜116th	37	0	0	0
Nebraska	Deb Fischer	R	Yea	Yea	115th｜116th	37	0	0	0
Nebraska	Ben Sasse	R	Yea	Yea	115th｜116th	36	0	1	0
Nevada	Dean Heller	R	—		115th	27	0	0	0
Nevada	Jacky Rosen	D	Nay	Nay	116th	2	0	8	0
Nevada	Catherine Cortez Masto	D	Nay	Nay	115th｜116th	15	0	22	0
New Hampshire	Jeanne Shaheen	D	Nay	Nay	115th｜116th	17	0	20	0
New Hampshire	Maggie Hassan	D	Nay	Nay	115th｜116th	16	0	21	0
New Jersey	Bob Menendez	D	Nay	Nay	115th｜116th	12	0	25	0
New Jersey	Cory Booker	D	Nay	Nay	115th｜116th	4	5	28	0
New Mexico	Martin Heinrich	D	Nay	Nay	115th｜116th	12	0	25	0
New Mexico	Tom Udall	D	Nay	Nay	115th｜116th	11	0	26	0
New York	Kirsten Gillibrand	D	Nay	Nay	115th｜116th	2	2	33	0
New York	Chuck Schumer	D	Nay	Nay	115th｜116th	10	0	27	0
North Carolina	Thom Tillis	R	Yea	Yea	115th｜116th	37	0	0	0
North Carolina	Richard Burr	R	No vote	No vote	115th｜116th	32	5	0	0
North Dakota	Heidi Heitkamp	D	—		115th	22	0	5	0
North Dakota	Kevin Cramer	R	Yea	Yea	116th	10	0	0	0
North Dakota	John Hoeven	R	Yea	Yea	115th｜116th	37	0	0	0
Ohio	Sherrod Brown	D	Nay	Nay	115th｜116th	13	1	23	0
Ohio	Rob Portman	R	Yea	Yea	115th｜116th	36	1	0	0
Oklahoma	Jim Inhofe	R	Yea	Yea	115th｜116th	37	0	0	0
Oklahoma	James Lankford	R	Yea	Yea	115th｜116th	37	0	0	0
Oregon	Jeff Merkley	D	Nay	Nay	115th｜116th	4	0	33	0
Oregon	Ron Wyden	D	Nay	Nay	115th｜116th	6	0	31	0
Pennsylvania	Bob Casey Jr.	D	Nay	Nay	115th｜116th	14	0	23	0
Pennsylvania	Pat Toomey	R	Yea	Yea	115th｜116th	35	2	0	0
Rhode Island	Sheldon Whitehouse	D	Nay	Nay	115th｜116th	10	1	26	0
Rhode Island	Jack Reed	D	Nay	Nay	115th｜116th	10	0	27	0
South Carolina	Lindsey Graham	R	Yea	Yea	115th｜116th	36	1	0	0
South Carolina	Tim Scott	R	Yea	Yea	115th｜116th	36	1	0	0
South Dakota	Mike Rounds	R	No vote	Yea	115th｜116th	35	2	0	0
South Dakota	John Thune	R	Yea	Yea	115th｜116th	37	0	0	0
Tennessee	Bob Corker	R	—		115th	24	3	0	0
Tennessee	Marsha Blackburn	R	Yea	Yea	116th	10	0	0	0
Tennessee	Lamar Alexander	R	No vote	Yea	115th｜116th	33	4	0	0
Texas	Ted Cruz	R	Yea	Yea	115th｜116th	37	0	0	0
Texas	John Cornyn	R	Yea	Yea	115th｜116th	37	0	0	0
Utah	Orrin Hatch	R	—		115th	27	0	0	0
Utah	Mitt Romney	R	Yea	Yea	116th	10	0	0	0
Utah	Mike Lee	R	Yea	Yea	115th｜116th	37	0	0	0
Vermont	Bernie Sanders	I-D	No vote	Nay	115th｜116th	3	6	28	0
Vermont	Patrick Leahy	D	Nay	Nay	115th｜116th	12	0	25	0
Virginia	Tim Kaine	D	Nay	Nay	115th｜116th	16	0	21	0
Virginia	Mark Warner	D	Nay	Nay	115th｜116th	22	0	15	0
Washington	Maria Cantwell	D	Nay	Nay	115th｜116th	13	0	24	0
Washington	Patty Murray	D	No vote	No vote	115th｜116th	12	2	23	0
West Virginia	Joe Manchin	D	Nay	Nay	115th｜116th	29	0	8	0
West Virginia	Shelley Moore Capito	R	Yea	Yea	115th｜116th	36	1	0	0
Wisconsin	Tammy Baldwin	D	Nay	Nay	115th｜116th	10	0	27	0
Wisconsin	Ron Johnson	R	Yea	Yea	115th｜116th	37	0	0	0
Wyoming	John Barrasso	R	Yea	Yea	115th｜116th	37	0	0	0
Wyoming	Mike Enzi	R	Yea	Yea	115th｜116th	37	0	0	0
	vote by party	R D Ind.	49–0 (4 NV); 0–43 (2 NV); 0–1 (1 NV); Ratcliffe	51–0 (2 NV); 0–43 (2 NV); 0–2; Vought	R (1930 votes); D (1696 votes); Ind. (74 votes); Total (3700)	1870; 598; 27; Yea	44; 35; 6 No vote	13; 1063; 41; Nay	3; 0; 0 Present

Affiliation: D denotes Democratic, R denotes Republican, and I-D denotes an independent who caucuses with Democrats.
Notes: — = not a Senator during this vote; NV = Not Voting; Pres = Present; VP: Y/N = Vice President voted Yea or Nay

==== Committee process ====
Cabinet confirmation process
Office	Nominee	State	Announcement	Hearing date	Senate committee vote date	Senate committee vote	Full Senate vote date	Confirmation	Hearings
Secretary of State	Rex Tillerson	TX	December 13, 2016	January 11, 2017	January 23, 2017	11–10	February 1, 2017	56–43	(Note: Congressional hearings, CEO Rex Tillerson, Sec. State.)
Secretary of State	Mike Pompeo	KS	March 13, 2018	April 12, 2018	April 23, 2018	11–9	April 26, 2018	57–42	(Note: Congressional hearings, Dir. CIA Mike Pompeo, Sec. State.)
Secretary of the Treasury	Steven Mnuchin	CA	November 30, 2016	January 19, 2017	February 1, 2017	14–0	February 13, 2017	53–47	(Note: Congressional hearings, Steven Mnuchin, Sec. Treasury.)
Secretary of Defense	Jim Mattis	WA	December 1, 2016	January 12, 2017	January 18, 2017	26–1	January 20, 2017	98–1	(Note: Congressional hearings, Gen. James Mattis, Sec. Def.)
Secretary of Defense	Patrick Shanahan	WA	May 9, 2019	Nomination withdrawn on June 18, 2019					
Secretary of Defense	Mark Esper	VA	June 24, 2019	July 16, 2019	July 18, 2019	Voice vote (26–1)	July 23, 2019	90–8	(Note: Congressional hearings, Dr. Mark Esper, Sec. Def.)
Attorney General	Jeff Sessions	AL	November 18, 2016	January 10, 2017	February 1, 2017	11–9	February 8, 2017	52–47	(Note: Congressional hearings, Sen. Jeff Sessions, AttyGen.)
Attorney General	William Barr	VA	December 7, 2018	January 15, 2019	February 7, 2019	12–10	February 14, 2019	54–45	(Note: Congressional hearings, William Barr, AttyGen.)
Secretary of the Interior	Ryan Zinke	MT	December 15, 2016	January 17, 2017	January 31, 2017	16–6	March 1, 2017	68–31	(Note: Congressional hearings, Rep. Ryan Zinke, Sec. Interior.)
Secretary of the Interior	David Bernhardt	CO	February 4, 2019	March 28, 2019	April 4, 2019	14–6	April 11, 2019	56–41	(Note: Congressional hearings, David Bernhardt, Sec. Interior.)
Secretary of Agriculture	Sonny Perdue	GA	January 18, 2017	March 23, 2017	March 30, 2017	Voice vote (19–1)	April 24, 2017	87–11	(Note: Congressional hearings, Gov. Sonny Perdue, Sec. Ag.)
Secretary of Commerce	Wilbur Ross	FL	November 30, 2016	January 18, 2017	January 24, 2017	Voice vote	February 27, 2017	72–27	(Note: Congressional hearings, CEO Wilbur Ross, Sec. Commerce.)
Secretary of Labor	Andrew Puzder	TN	December 8, 2016	Nomination withdrawn on February 15, 2017					
Secretary of Labor	Alex Acosta	FL	February 16, 2017	March 22, 2017	March 30, 2017	12–11	April 27, 2017	60–38	(Note: Congressional hearings, Alex Acosta, Sec. Labor.)
Secretary of Labor	Eugene Scalia	VA	July 18, 2019	September 19, 2019	September 24, 2019	12–11	September 26, 2019	53–44	(Note: Congressional hearings, Eugene Scalia, Sec. Labor.)
Secretary of Health and Human Services	Tom Price	GA	November 29, 2016	January 18, 2017	February 1, 2017	14–0	February 10, 2017	52–47	(Note: Congressional hearings, Rep. Tom Price Sec. HHS (HELP) (Finance).)
Secretary of Health and Human Services	Alex Azar	IN	November 13, 2017	November 29, 2017	January 17, 2018	15–12	January 24, 2018	55–43	(Note: Congressional hearings, Alex Azar Sec. HHS (HELP) (Finance).)
Secretary of Housing and Urban Development	Ben Carson	FL	December 5, 2016	January 12, 2017	January 24, 2017	23–0	March 2, 2017	58–41	(Note: Congressional hearings, Dr. Ben Carson, Sec. HUD.)
Secretary of Transportation	Elaine Chao	KY	November 29, 2016	January 11, 2017	January 24, 2017	Voice vote	January 31, 2017	93–6	(Note: Congressional hearings, Sec. Elaine Chao, Sec.USDOT.)
Secretary of Energy	Rick Perry	TX	December 14, 2016	January 19, 2017	January 31, 2017	16–7	March 2, 2017	62–37	(Note: Congressional hearings, Gov. Rick Perry, Sec. Energy.)
Secretary of Energy	Dan Brouillette	TX	October 18, 2019	November 14, 2019	November 19, 2019	16–4	December 2, 2019	70–15	(Note: Congressional hearings, Dan R. Brouillette, Sec. Energy.)
Secretary of Education	Betsy DeVos	MI	November 23, 2016	January 17, 2017	January 31, 2017	12–11	February 7, 2017	51–50	(Note: Congressional hearings, Betsy DeVos, Sec. Edu.)
Secretary of Veterans Affairs	David Shulkin	PA	January 11, 2017	February 1, 2017	February 7, 2017	15–0	February 13, 2017	100–0	(Note: Congressional hearings, Dr. David Shulkin, Sec. VA.)
Secretary of Veterans Affairs	Ronny Jackson	TX	March 28, 2018	Nomination withdrawn on April 26, 2018					
Secretary of Veterans Affairs	Robert Wilkie	NC	May 18, 2018	June 27, 2018	July 10, 2018	14–1	July 23, 2018	86–9	(Note: Congressional hearings, Robert Wilkie, Sec. VA.)
Secretary of Homeland Security	John F. Kelly	MA	December 7, 2016	January 10, 2017	January 18, 2017	Voice vote (14–1)	January 20, 2017	88–11	(Note: Congressional hearings, Gen. John F. Kelly, Sec. Homeland.)
Secretary of Homeland Security	Kirstjen Nielsen	FL	October 12, 2017	November 8, 2017	November 14, 2017	11–4	December 5, 2017	62–37	(Note: Congressional hearings, Kirstjen Nielsen, Sec. Homeland.)
Secretary of Homeland Security	Chad Wolf	VA	August 25, 2020	September 23, 2020	September 30, 2020	6–3	Nomination withdrawn on January 7, 2021		(Note: Congressional hearings, Chad Wolf, Sec. Homeland.)
Trade Representative	Robert Lighthizer	FL	January 3, 2017	March 14, 2017	April 25, 2017	26–0	May 11, 2017	82–14	(Note: Congressional hearings, Robert Lighthizer, U.S. Trade Rep.)
Director of National Intelligence	Dan Coats	IN	January 7, 2017	February 28, 2017	March 9, 2017	13–2	March 15, 2017	85–12	(Note: Congressional hearings, Sen. Dan Coats, DNI.)
Director of National Intelligence	John Ratcliffe	TX	July 28, 2019	Nomination withdrawn on August 2, 2019					
Director of National Intelligence	John Ratcliffe	TX	February 28, 2020	May 5, 2020	May 19, 2020	8–7	May 21, 2020	49–44	(Note: Congressional hearings, Rep. John Ratcliffe, DNI.)
Director of the Central Intelligence Agency	Mike Pompeo	KS	November 18, 2016	January 12, 2017	January 20, 2017	Voice vote	January 23, 2017	66–32	(Note: Congressional hearings, Rep. Mike Pompeo, Dir. CIA.)
Director of the Central Intelligence Agency	Gina Haspel	KY	March 13, 2018	May 9, 2018	May 16, 2018	10–5	May 17, 2018	54–45	(Note: Congressional hearings, Gina Haspel, Dir. CIA.)
Environmental Protection Agency	Scott Pruitt	OK	December 7, 2016	January 18, 2017	February 2, 2017	11–0	February 17, 2017	52–46	(Note: Congressional hearings, Okla. AttyGen. Scott Pruitt, EPA Admin.)
Environmental Protection Agency	Andrew R. Wheeler	VA	November 16, 2018	January 16, 2019	February 5, 2019	11–10	February 28, 2019	52–47	(Note: Congressional hearings, Andrew R. Wheeler, EPA Admin.)
Small Business Administration	Linda McMahon	CT	December 7, 2016	January 24, 2017	January 31, 2017	18–1	February 14, 2017	81–19	(Note: Congressional hearings, Linda McMahon, SBA Admin.)
Small Business Administration	Jovita Carranza	IL	April 4, 2019	December 11, 2019	December 18, 2019	17–2	January 7, 2020	88–5	(Note: Congressional hearings, Jovita Carranza, SBA Admin.)
Management and Budget	Mick Mulvaney	SC	December 16, 2016	January 24, 2017	February 2, 2017	12–11, 8–7	February 16, 2017	51–49	(Note: Congressional hearings, Rep. Mick Mulvaney, Dir. OMB (Budget) (HSGAC).)
Management and Budget	Russell Vought	VA	March 18, 2020	June 2, 2020; June 3, 2020	June 10, 2020; June 11, 2020	7–4, 11–10	July 20, 2020	51–45	(Note: Congressional hearings, Russell Vought, Dir. OMB (Budget) (HSGAC).)
Ambassador to the United Nations (Note: Position was downgraded to a non-cabinet role following Haley's resignation on December 31, 2018.)	Nikki Haley	SC	November 23, 2016	January 18, 2017	January 24, 2017	Voice vote (19–2)	January 24, 2017	96–4	(Note: Congressional hearings, Gov. Nikki Haley, U.N. Ambassador.)
Ambassador to the United Nations	Heather Nauert	IL	December 7, 2018	Nomination withdrawn on February 16, 2019					
Ambassador to the United Nations	Kelly Craft	KY	February 22, 2019	June 19, 2019	July 25, 2019	15–7	July 31, 2019	56–34	(Note: Congressional hearings, Ambassador Kelly Craft, U.N. Ambassador.)

== Analysis ==
Due to Trump's lack of prior government or military experience, and his political positions, much interest was expressed in the media over his cabinet nominations, as they were believed to show how he intended to govern.

Trump's proposed cabinet was characterized by the media as being very conservative. It was described as a "conservative dream team" by Politico, "the most conservative cabinet [in United States history]" by Newsweek, and "one of the most consistently conservative domestic policy teams in modern history" by the Los Angeles Times. The Hill described Trump's potential cabinet as "an unorthodox team" popular with conservatives, that more establishment Republicans such as John McCain or Mitt Romney likely would not have chosen. CNN agreed, calling the proposed cabinet "a conservative dream team of domestic Cabinet appointments." On the other hand, The Wall Street Journal stated that "it's nearly impossible to identify a clear ideological bent in the incoming president's" cabinet nominations. The Wall Street Journal also stated that Trump's nominations signaled a pro-deregulation administration policy. Several of his cabinet nominees politically opposed the federal departments they were selected to lead.

In terms of total personal wealth, Trump's cabinet was the wealthiest in modern American history. The cabinet was largely made up of nominees who had business experience but minimal or no experience in the government when compared to the administrations of Ronald Reagan, George H. W. Bush, Bill Clinton, George W. Bush and Barack Obama. The Pew Research Center also noted that Trump's cabinet was one of the most business-heavy in American history: "A third of the department heads in the Trump administration (33%) were people whose prior experience had been entirely in the public sector. Only three other U.S. presidents are in the same range: William McKinley (three out of eight Cabinet positions, or 37.5%), Ronald Reagan (four out of 13 positions, or 31%), and Dwight Eisenhower (three out of 10 positions, or 30%)." There were no economists in President Trump's cabinet. There were also significantly fewer lawyers in Trump's cabinet compared to previous presidents' cabinets.

=== Confirmation delays ===
Despite being nominated promptly during the transition period, most cabinet members were unable to take office on Inauguration Day because of delays in the formal confirmation process. By February 8, 2017, President Trump had fewer cabinet nominees confirmed than any prior president two weeks into his mandate, except George Washington. Part of the lateness was ascribed to opposition by Senate Democrats and part to delays in submitting background-check paperwork. The final initial Cabinet member to take office, Robert Lighthizer, took office as U.S. Trade Representative on May 11, 2017, more than four months after his nomination.

== History ==
Choosing members of the presidential Cabinet (and other high-level positions) is a complicated process, and began before the November 2016 general election results were known. In the case of the Trump 2016 campaign, his former rival for the Republican nomination Chris Christie was appointed to lead the transition team in May 2016, shortly after Ted Cruz and John Kasich suspended their campaigns (thus making Trump the presumptive nominee of the party). In addition to various other responsibilities, the transition team is responsible for making preliminary lists of potential executive branch appointees—at least for the several dozen high-level positions if not for the several thousand lower-level positions—and doing some early vetting work on those people. The transition team also hires policy experts (more than a hundred in the case of the Trump transition team by October 2016), using primarily federal funds and federal office space, to help plan how a then-hypothetical Trump administration would implement their policy-goals via the various federal agencies and departments.

After the election on November 8, 2016, when the ticket formed by Trump and Pence defeated the Clinton and Kaine ticket as well as various third party opponents, the transition team was quickly reshuffled and expanded; Mike Pence was given the lead role (over Chris Christie), and several additional top-level transition personnel were added to the transition effort, most of them from the now-finished campaign effort. During the remainder of 2016, the team continued finding and vetting potential nominees for the various positions, as the Electoral College process was ongoing (including recounts in some states where the winning margin was relatively tiny) and before the presidential inauguration on January 20, 2017.

President-elect Trump announced his first post-election Cabinet nominee, Jeff Sessions for the role of United States Attorney General, on November 18, 2016. (Trump had earlier announced Mike Pence as his pick for vice-presidential running mate in July 2016, which was shortly thereafter confirmed by the delegates to the Republican National Convention when they officially nominated first Trump and then Pence.) Although most positions were simultaneously under consideration by the transition team, the official announcement of offers, and the public acceptance of the offers, usually happens gradually as slots are filled (Richard Nixon being the exception).

President	Week (from election to announcement)										Weighted average	Notes
President	1	2	3	4	5	6	7	8	9	10	Weighted average	Notes
Nixon '68						12					6.0 weeks	The Postmaster General position was quasi-privatized in 1971.
Carter '76					1	2	7	2			6.8 weeks	Two new Cabinet positions: Energy in 1977, Education in 1979.
Reagan '80						8	4			1	6.6 weeks	Failed attempt to abolish the federal Department of Education.
Bush '88	2	2			1	3	5			1	5.3 weeks	The VA was established in 1989. The four earliest nominees were continuations of the Reagan Cabinet.
Clinton '92						4	6	4			7.0 weeks	
Bush '00						1	5	8			7.5 weeks	The DHS was established in 2003. Announcements of appointees were delayed by the Florida recount.
Obama '08			1	4	2	4	4				5.4 weeks	Slightly differing figures are given in some sources.
Trump '16		1	3	4	3	2				2	4.9 weeks	
Biden '20			2	1	2	4	3			3	6.3 weeks	
Trump '24	2	8	5								2.2 weeks	

For purposes of historical comparison, this chart includes only Cabinet roles, and not the cabinet-level positions. However, note that the number of Cabinet positions has varied from administration to administration: under Nixon there were twelve such roles in 1968, whereas under Trump in 2016 there are fifteen.

== Formation ==
After Election Day, media outlets reported on persons described by various sources as possible appointments to senior positions in the incoming Trump presidency. The number of people which have received media attention as potential cabinet appointees is higher than in most previous presidential elections, partly because the Trump '16 campaign staff (and associated PACs) was significantly smaller and less expensive, thus there are not as many people already expected to receive specific roles in the upcoming Trump administration. In particular, "Trump ha[d] a smaller policy brain trust [policy group] than a new president normally carries" because as an anti-establishment candidate who began his campaign by largely self-funding his way to the Republican Party nomination, unlike most previous presidential winners "Trump does not have the traditional cadre of Washington insiders and donors to build out his Cabinet." An additional factor that tends to make the field of potential nominees especially broad, is that unlike most presidential transition teams who select politicians as their appointees, the Trump transition team "has started with a mandate to hire from the private sector [as opposed to the governmental sector] whenever possible."

== Elected officials ==
=== President ===
Donald Trump defeated the former secretary of state and Democratic nominee, Hillary Clinton, in the 2016 presidential election, receiving 304 electoral votes compared to Clinton's 227 electoral votes in the election. The formal certification of the results took place on January 6, 2017. He assumed office on January 20, 2017.

President of the United States
Portrait	Name	Date of birth	State	Background	Reference
	Donald Trump	June 14, 1946	New York	Chairman of The Trump Organization (1971–2017); Host and producer of The Apprentice (2004–2015)	

=== Vice President ===
The vice president is the only cabinet member to be elected to the position who does not require Senate confirmation, and the vice president does not serve at the pleasure of the president. There were dozens of potential running mates for Trump who received media speculation. Trump's eventual pick of the governor of Indiana, Mike Pence, was officially announced on July 15, 2016, and confirmed by acclamation via parliamentary procedure amongst delegates to the 2016 Republican National Convention on July 19, 2016.

Governor of Indiana Mike Pence was elected Vice President of the United States, receiving 305 electoral votes, compared to United States senator, Tim Kaine (D-VA), who received 227 electoral votes in the election. The formal certification of the results took place on January 6, 2017. He assumed office on January 20, 2017.

Vice President of the United States
Portrait	Name	Date of birth	State	Background	Reference
	Mike Pence	June 7, 1959	Indiana	50th Governor of Indiana (2013–2017); Chair of the House Republican Conference (2009–2011); U.S. representative from IN-2 (2001–2003) and IN-6 (2003–2013)	

== Nominated candidates for Cabinet positions ==
The following cabinet positions are listed in order of their creation (also used as the basis for the United States presidential line of succession).

=== Secretary of State ===
The nomination of a Secretary-designate is reviewed during hearings held by the members of the Foreign Relations committee, then presented to the full Senate for a vote.

==== Thomas Shannon (acting) ====
Before Tillerson was sworn in, Tom Shannon served as the acting secretary from January 20 until February 1, 2017.

==== Rex Tillerson (2017–2018) ====
President-elect Trump officially selected CEO of ExxonMobil Rex Tillerson as Secretary of State on December 12, 2016. Tillerson was first recommended to Trump for the secretary of state role by Condoleezza Rice, during her meeting with Trump in late November. Rice's recommendation of Tillerson to Trump was backed up by Robert Gates three days later.

Tillerson's confirmation hearing with the Foreign Relations committee was held on January 11, 2017. During the hearing, Tillerson voiced support for the Trans-Pacific Partnership and opposed a Muslim immigration ban that has been proposed by Donald Trump in the past. Tillerson was approved by the Foreign Relations committee on January 23, 2017, by a vote of 11–10. On February 1, Tillerson was confirmed by the Senate in a vote of 56–43 and was sworn in later that day.

Secretary of State
Portrait	Name	Date of birth	State	Background	Reference
	Rex Tillerson	March 23, 1952 (age 74)	Texas	President of the Boy Scouts of America (2010–2012); CEO of ExxonMobil (2006–2016)	

==== John Sullivan (acting) ====
John J. Sullivan served as acting secretary from April 1, 2018, until April 26, 2018.

==== Mike Pompeo (2018–2021) ====
On March 13, 2018, President Trump dismissed Rex Tillerson as Secretary of State, and announced his nomination of CIA Director Mike Pompeo to the office. On April 26, Pompeo was confirmed by the Senate in a vote of 57–42 and was sworn in later that day. He served until the end of the Trump administration, on January 20, 2021.

Secretary of State
Portrait	Name	Date of birth	State	Background	Reference
	Mike Pompeo	December 30, 1963 (age 62)	Kansas	Director of the Central Intelligence Agency (2017–2018); U.S. representative from KS-4 (2011–2017)	

=== Secretary of the Treasury ===
The nomination of a Secretary-designate is reviewed during hearings held by the members of the Finance committee, then presented to the full Senate for a vote.

==== Adam Szubin (acting) ====
Adam Szubin served as acting secretary from January 20 until February 13, 2017.

==== Steven Mnuchin (2017–2021) ====
President-elect Trump announced the selection of investment banker Steve Mnuchin as Secretary of the Treasury on November 30, 2016. The New York Times noted that Mnuchin's selection was surprising, since Trump had attacked the banking industry and Goldman Sachs during the campaign. Mnuchin is the third Goldman alumnus to serve as treasury secretary.

During his confirmation hearing before the Senate Finance Committee on January 19, 2017, Mnuchin was criticized by Democrats due to the foreclosure practices at his company OneWest. Mnuchin also failed to disclose, in required disclosure documents, $95 million of real estate he owned, and his role as director of Dune Capital International, an investment fund in a tax haven. Mnuchin described the omissions as mistakes made amid a mountain of bureaucracy.

Democrats of the Finance Committee boycotted the vote of Mnuchin and many other nominees in response to Trump's controversial immigration executive order. On February 1, 2017, Republicans suspended committee rules to send the nomination to the Senate floor on a vote of 11–0.

Mnuchin was confirmed by the Senate in a vote of 53–47 on February 13, 2017. The vote fell along party lines with exception of Senator Joe Manchin as the sole Democratic vote for Mnuchin. He served until the end of the Trump administration, on January 20, 2021.

Secretary of the Treasury
Portrait	Name	Date of birth	State	Background	Reference
	Steven Mnuchin	December 21, 1962 (age 63)	California	CEO of OneWest Bank	

=== Secretary of Defense ===
The nomination of a Secretary-designate is reviewed during hearings held by the members of the Armed Services committee, then presented to the full Senate for a vote.

==== Jim Mattis (2017–2019) ====
President-elect Trump informally announced the selection of General Jim Mattis as Secretary of Defense on December 1, 2016. (The Trump Transition Team formally announced the selection on December 6, 2016.) As with most cabinet roles, the Secretary-designate of Defense undergoes hearings before the appropriate committee of the United States Senate, followed by a confirmation-vote. In the case of Mattis, there was an additional step needed as he had retired from the military three years ago, since statute section 903(a) of the NDAA demands a minimum of seven years as a civilian for Pentagon appointees, therefore Mattis needed a waiver to be allowed to become Secretary of Defense.

During his hearing, Mattis agreed with the assessment that debt was the greatest threat to national security. He placed Russia first among the "principal threats" facing the United States and called Iran "the primary source of turmoil" for unrest in the Middle East. In contrast with Trump's campaign promises, Mattis advocated for maintaining NATO and keeping the Iran Nuclear Deal. He urged for a clear cybersecurity doctrine to be implemented.

On January 12, 2017, the Senate Armed Services Committee voted, 24–3, to grant the waiver. The full Senate voted, 81–17, to pass the waiver three hours later. After the Trump transition team canceled a meeting between Mattis and the House Armed Services Committee, the waiver narrowly passed the committee by a vote of 34–28. The House voted, 268–151, to grant the waiver. The Senate Armed Services Committee approved Mattis's confirmation on January 18, 2017, by a 26–1 margin, and sent the nomination to the full Senate for consideration. One of Donald Trump's first acts as president was the approval of Mattis's waiver to become Secretary of Defense. After being confirmed by the Senate on the evening of January 20, 2017, in a vote of 98–1, Mattis was sworn in by Vice President Pence on the same evening.

On December 20, 2018, Secretary Mattis announced his intention to resign at the end of February 2019. President Trump moved the departure date up to January 1, 2019.

Secretary of Defense
Portrait	Name	Date of birth	State	Background	Reference
	Jim Mattis	September 8, 1950 (age 76)	Washington	11th Commander of the United States Central Command (2011–2013); 5th Commander of the United States Joint Forces Command (2007–2010); 3rd Allied Command Transformation (2007–2008)	

==== Patrick Shanahan (acting) ====
Upon the end of Secretary Mattis's tenure on January 1, Patrick M. Shanahan, the Deputy Secretary of Defense, became acting Secretary until June 23, 2019.

==== Failed nomination of Patrick Shanahan ====
Five months later, in May, the White House announced its intent to nominate Shanahan to serve as Secretary of Defense on a permanent basis; by June, Shanahan withdrew, citing family issues.

==== Mark Esper (2019–2020) ====
With Shanahan's withdrawal, President Trump named Mark Esper, the Secretary of the Army, as his replacement as acting secretary. Once Esper was officially nominated on July 15, he stepped down in accordance with the Federal Vacancies Reform Act of 1998; Richard V. Spencer, the Secretary of the Navy, then became acting secretary.

On July 23, Esper was confirmed by the Senate in a vote of 90–8 and was sworn in later that day.

On November 9, 2020, Esper was removed from his position, and replaced with Christopher C. Miller.

Secretary of Defense
Portrait	Name	Date of birth	State	Background	Reference
	Mark Esper	April 26, 1964 (age 62)	Virginia	23rd Secretary of the Army (2017–2019}	

==== Christopher C. Miller (acting) ====
Christopher C. Miller served as acting Secretary from November 9, 2020, to the end of the Trump administration, on January 20, 2021.

=== Attorney General ===
The nomination of an Attorney General-designate is reviewed during hearings held by the members of the Judiciary committee, then presented to the full Senate for a vote.

==== Sally Yates (acting) ====
Sally Yates served as acting attorney general from January 20, 2017, until her firing ten days later, on January 30, 2017.

==== Dana Boente (acting) ====
On January 30, 2017, Trump appointed Dana Boente, the United States Attorney for the Eastern District of Virginia, to serve as acting Attorney General until Jeff Sessions' Senate confirmation. Boente had replaced Sally Yates who was fired by Trump for ordering the Justice Department to not defend Trump's Executive Order 13769 which restricted entry to the United States. Yates claimed that, "At present, I am not convinced that the defense of the executive order is consistent with these responsibilities [of the Department of Justice], nor am I convinced that the executive order is lawful". Boente served until the confirmation of Jeff Sessions on February 9, 2017.

==== Jeff Sessions (2017–2018) ====
President-elect Trump officially announced the selection of Senator Jeff Sessions from Alabama as Attorney General on November 18, 2016.

Members of the Democratic party in the Senate had stated their intention to oppose Sessions; that said, successfully defeating the nomination of Sessions would have required peeling away the votes of at least two or three Republican members of the Senate body. Republican members of the Judiciary Committee spoke favorably towards Sessions, as Sessions had been a former member of the Judiciary Committee while serving as senator. Although Democratic party senators, including Elizabeth Warren, criticized Sessions, at least one Democratic Senator, Joe Manchin of West Virginia, stated he would vote to confirm Sessions. Historically, there has never been a sitting senator appointed to cabinet position who was denied that post during the confirmation process.

The confirmation process for Trump's nominee Senator Jeff Sessions was described as "strikingly contentious" by The New York Times; as Senator Mitch McConnell invoked Rule XIX to silence Senator Elizabeth Warren for the rest of the consideration of the nomination. While explaining his use of the rule, McConnell said, "She [Warren] was warned. She was given an explanation. Nevertheless, she persisted." The last three words, "Nevertheless, she persisted" were appropriated by feminist and liberals as a rally cry in favor of women's rights. McConnell interrupted Warren as she had read a letter by Coretta Scott King opposing Sessions' nomination to a federal judgeship along with several statements which were made by Senator Ted Kennedy in 1986 during Senate hearings on Sessions' nomination. Afterwards, Warren live-streamed herself reading the letter, critical of Sessions, that Coretta Scott King had written to Senator Strom Thurmond in 1986.

On February 8, Sessions was confirmed as United States Attorney General by the Senate in a vote of 52–47, with all the Republican senators and Democratic Senator Joe Manchin voting in favor of Sessions' confirmation and all other senators voting against Sessions' confirmation. Sessions' confirmation ended a nomination battle which was described by The New York Times as "bitter and racially charged".

On November 7, 2018 – the day after the 2018 midterm elections – Jeff Sessions resigned as Attorney General at the president's request.

Attorney General
Portrait	Name	Date of birth	State	Background	Reference
	Jeff Sessions	December 24, 1946 (age 79)	Alabama	United States senator from Alabama (1997–2017); 44th Attorney General of Alabama (1995–1997); United States Attorney for the Southern District of Alabama (1981–1993)	

==== Matthew Whitaker (acting) ====
With the resignation of Sessions on November 7, 2018, Trump appointed Sessions' chief of staff Matthew Whitaker to serve as acting attorney general. Multiple legal challenges to Whitaker's appointment were filed. All were dismissed.

==== William Barr (2019–2020) ====
William Barr, a former Attorney General in the George H. W. Bush administration, was nominated to reprise his former role as the permanent replacement for Sessions on December 7, 2018. On February 14, 2019, he was confirmed by the Senate in a vote of 54–45 and was sworn in later that day. Barr announced that he would resign as attorney general on December 14, 2020, which came into effect on December 23, 2020.

Attorney General
Portrait	Name	Date of birth	State	Background	Reference
	William Barr	May 23, 1950 (age 76)	Virginia	77th United States Attorney General (1991–1993); 25th United States Deputy Attorney General (1990–1991); United States Assistant Attorney General for the Office of Legal Counsel (1989–1990)	

==== Jeffrey Rosen (acting) ====
Jeffrey A. Rosen became the acting Attorney General following the resignation of Barr on December 23, 2020. He served until the end of the Trump administration, January 20, 2021.

=== Secretary of the Interior ===
The nomination of a Secretary-designate is reviewed during hearings held by the members of the Energy and Natural Resources committee, then presented to the full Senate for a vote.

==== Kevin Haugrud (acting) ====
Kevin Haugrud served as the acting Secretary of the Interior from January 20 until March 1, 2017.

==== Ryan Zinke (2017–2019) ====
President-elect Trump announced the selection of Representative Ryan Zinke from Montana as Secretary of the Interior on December 15, 2016. His nomination was approved by a 16–6 vote from the Senate Energy and Natural Resources Committee on January 31, 2017. On March 1, 2017, Zinke was confirmed by the Senate in a vote of 68–31, becoming the first Navy SEAL to occupy a Cabinet position. Zinke resigned as Secretary of the Interior on January 2, 2019. Deputy Secretary David Bernhardt became Acting Secretary of the Interior.

Secretary of the Interior
Portrait	Name	Date of birth	State	Background	Reference
	Ryan Zinke	November 1, 1961 (age 65)	Montana	U.S. representative from MT-AL (2015–2017); Member of the Montana Senate from the 2nd district (2009–2013)	

==== David Bernhardt (acting) ====
David Bernhardt served as acting secretary from January 2 until April 11, 2019, when he was sworn in.

==== David Bernhardt (2019–2021) ====
On February 4, 2019, President Trump announced his intention to nominate Interior Deputy Secretary and Acting Secretary Bernhardt to be the next United States Secretary of the Interior. On April 11, 2019, Bernhardt was confirmed by the Senate in a vote of 56–41. He served until the end of the Trump administration, on January 20, 2021.

Secretary of the Interior
Portrait	Name	Date of birth	State	Background	Reference
	David Bernhardt	August 17, 1969 (age 57)	Colorado	77th United States Deputy Secretary of the Interior (2017–2019); Solicitor of the United States Department of the Interior (2006–2009)	

=== Secretary of Agriculture ===
The nomination of a Secretary-designate is reviewed during hearings held by the members of the Agriculture, Nutrition, and Forestry committee, then presented to the full Senate for a vote.

==== Mike Young (acting) ====
Mike Young served as acting secretary from January 20 until April 25, 2017.

==== Sonny Perdue (2017–2021) ====
President-elect Trump announced the selection of Sonny Perdue, former Governor of Georgia as Secretary of Agriculture on January 18, 2017. On April 24, 2017, Perdue was confirmed by the Senate in an 87–11 vote. He served until the end of the Trump administration, on January 20, 2021.

Secretary of Agriculture
Portrait	Name	Date of birth	State	Background	Reference
	Sonny Perdue	December 20, 1946 (age 79)	(Georgia (U.S. state)) Georgia	81st Governor of Georgia (2003–2011); Member of the Georgia State Senate from the 18th district (1991–2002)	

=== Secretary of Commerce ===
The nomination of a Secretary-designate is reviewed during hearings held by the members of the Commerce, Science, and Transportation committee, then presented to the full Senate for a vote.

==== Vacant ====
President Trump left this position vacant until Ross was sworn in.

==== Wilbur Ross (2017–2021) ====
President-elect Trump officially announced the selection of CEO Wilbur Ross from Florida (formerly of New York) on November 30, 2016. Confirmation hearings were originally scheduled for January 12, but were postponed because the Commerce Committee had not yet received the ethics agreement from the Office of Government Ethics and the Department of Commerce. On February 27, 2017, he was confirmed by the Senate in a vote of 72–27. He assumed office on February 28, 2017, and served until the end of the Trump administration, on January 20, 2021.

Secretary of Commerce
Portrait	Name	Date of birth	State	Background	Reference
	Wilbur Ross	November 28, 1937 (age 88)	Florida	CEO of the WL Ross & Co.	

=== Secretary of Labor ===
The nomination of a Secretary-designate is reviewed during hearings held by the members of the Health, Education, Labor, and Pensions committee, then presented to the full Senate for a vote.

==== Edward Hugler (acting) ====
Edward C. Hugler served as acting secretary from January 20 until April 28, 2017.

==== Failed nomination of Andy Puzder ====
President-elect Trump officially announced the selection of Andy Puzder, then CEO of CKE Restaurants as the Secretary of Labor on December 8, 2016. The Health, Education, Labor, and Pensions committee (HELP) delayed Puzder's hearing five times due to missing paperwork from the Office of Government Ethics. It was revealed that before the nomination Puzder employed a housekeeper who was not authorized to work in the U.S. Puzder failed to pay employer taxes. Puzder fired the housekeeper and amended his taxes only after his nomination. Prior cabinet nominations from the Bush and Clinton administrations with undocumented housekeepers have had to withdraw their nominations.

On February 8, 2017, the Office of Government Ethics submitted Puzder's ethics paperwork to Congress. It was also revealed Puzder's ex-wife Lisa Fierstein appeared in disguise on Oprah Winfrey's talk show in the 1980s. In the interview, she alleged Puzder beat her. She later recanted. Fierstein sent a letter to Congress shortly after his nomination stating, "Andy is not and was not abusive or violent." Complying with the HELP committee, the Oprah Winfrey Network produced tapes from the interview for members of the committee to view. Four Republican Senators from the HELP committee – Susan Collins, Tim Scott, Johnny Isakson, and Lisa Murkowski – expressed doubt over Puzder's nomination. On February 15, a day before his scheduled hearing, Puzder released a statement to the Associated Press officially withdrawing his nomination.

==== Alexander Acosta (2017–2019) ====
On February 16, 2017, Alexander Acosta, dean of the Florida International University College of Law and former Justice Department attorney, was officially selected to be the Secretary of Labor. On April 27, 2017, Acosta was confirmed by the Senate in a vote of 60–38.

Acosta announced his resignation on July 12, 2019, following widespread criticism of his handling of the prosecution of and subsequent plea deal with Jeffrey Epstein when serving as U.S. District Attorney in Florida. His deputy, Patrick Pizzella, became acting secretary.

Secretary of Labor
Portrait	Name	Date of birth	State	Background	Reference
	Alexander Acosta	January 16, 1969 (age 57)	Florida	Dean of the Florida International University College of Law (2009–2017); United States Attorney for the Southern District of Florida (2005–2009); United States Assistant Attorney General for the Civil Rights Division (2003–2005); Member of the National Labor Relations Board (2002–2003)	

==== Patrick Pizzella (acting) ====
Patrick Pizzella served as acting secretary from July 20 until September 30, 2019.

==== Eugene Scalia (2019–2021) ====
On July 18, 2019, President Trump announced his intent to nominate Eugene Scalia, the former Solicitor of Labor and the son of Antonin Scalia, to be Secretary of Labor; the nomination became official on August 27.

Almost exactly a month later, on September 26, Scalia was confirmed by the Senate in a vote of 53–44. He was sworn in four days later. He served until the end of the Trump administration, January 20, 2021.

Secretary of Labor
Portrait	Name	Date of birth	State	Background	Reference
	Eugene Scalia	August 14, 1963 (age 63)	Virginia	25th United States Solicitor of Labor (2002–2003)	

=== Secretary of Health and Human Services ===
Although historically the nominee also holds meetings with the Health, Education, Labor, and Pensions committee, officially the nomination of a Secretary-designate is reviewed during hearings held by the members of the United States Senate Committee on Finance, then presented to the full Senate for a vote.

==== Norris Cochran (acting) ====
Norris Cochran served as acting secretary from January 20 until February 10, 2017.

==== Tom Price (2017) ====
President-elect Trump officially announced the selection of Representative Tom Price from Georgia as Secretary of Health and Human Services on November 28, 2016. On February 10, 2017, Price was confirmed by the Senate in a vote of 52–47, along party lines, with all Republicans voting in favor and all Democrats voting against.

Price resigned on September 29, 2017, amid reports that he had expended more than $1 million of department funds for his own travel on private charter jets and military aircraft. Price is the shortest-serving confirmed Secretary of Health and Human Services, with a tenure of just 231 days.

Secretary of Health and Human Services
Portrait	Name	Date of birth	State	Background	Reference
	Tom Price	October 8, 1954 (age 72)	(Georgia (U.S. state)) Georgia	U.S. representative from GA-6 (2005–2017); Chair of the House Budget Committee (2015–2017); Majority Leader of the Georgia State Senate (2002–2003); Majority Whip of the Georgia State Senate (1998–2002); Member of the Georgia State Senate from the 56th district (1997–2005)	

==== Don J. Wright (acting) ====
Don J. Wright served as acting secretary from September 29, 2017, until his resignation on October 10, 2017.

==== Eric Hargan (acting) ====
Eric Hargan served as acting secretary from October 10, 2017, until January 29, 2018.

==== Alex Azar (2018–2021) ====
On November 13, 2017, President Trump announced via Twitter that Alex Azar was his nominee to be the next Secretary of Health and Human Services. Azar was the former deputy secretary of the U.S. Department of Health and Human Services under George W. Bush (2005–2007) and president of Lilly USA, LLC, the largest affiliate of global biopharmaceutical leader Eli Lilly and Company from 2012 to 2017. On January 24, 2018, Azar was confirmed by the Senate in a vote of 53–43. He took office on January 29, 2018, and served until the end of the Trump administration, on January 20, 2021.

Secretary of Health and Human Services
Portrait	Name	Date of birth	State	Background	Reference
	Alex Azar	June 17, 1967 (age 59)	Indiana	United States Deputy Secretary of Health and Human Services (2005–2007); General Counsel of the United States Department of Health and Human Services (2001–2005)	

=== Secretary of Housing and Urban Development ===
The nomination of a secretary-designate is reviewed during hearings held by the members of the Banking, Housing, and Urban Affairs committee, then presented to the full Senate for a vote.

==== Craig Clemmensen (acting) ====
Craig Clemmensen served as acting secretary from January 20 until March 2, 2017.

==== Ben Carson (2017–2021) ====
President-elect Trump announced the selection of Ben Carson as Secretary of Housing and Urban Development on December 5, 2016. During confirmation hearings, Carson was held under close scrutiny for his lack of relevant experience, and because he has been one of the most hostile critics of HUD's role in enforcing anti-discrimination laws. On January 24, 2017, the Senate Banking Committee voted unanimously to approve the nomination, sending it to the Senate floor for a complete vote. On March 2, 2017, Carson was confirmed by the Senate in a vote of 58–41. He served until the end of the Trump administration, on January 20, 2021.

Secretary of Housing and Urban Development
Portrait	Name	Date of birth	State	Background	Reference
	Ben Carson	September 18, 1951 (age 75)	Florida	Candidate for President of the United States in 2016; Neurosurgeon	

=== Secretary of Transportation ===
The nomination of a Secretary-designate is reviewed during hearings held by the members of the Commerce, Science, and Transportation committee, then presented to the full Senate for a vote.

==== Michael Huerta (acting) ====
Michael Huerta served as acting secretary from January 20 until January 31, 2017.

==== Elaine Chao (2017–2021) ====
On November 29, 2016, it was reported that President-elect Trump announced the selection of Elaine Chao, former Secretary of Labor in the George W. Bush administration as his Secretary of Transportation. On January 31, Chao was confirmed by the Senate by a vote of 93–6. (Note: Her husband, Senator Mitch McConnell (R-Ky.), voted "present" due to the conflict of interest.) On January 7, 2021, Chao announced her resignation effective January 11, due to the January 6 U.S. Capitol attack.

Secretary of Transportation
Portrait	Name	Date of birth	State	Background	Reference
	Elaine Chao	March 26, 1953 (age 73)	Kentucky	24th United States Secretary of Labor (2001–2009); 12th Director of the Peace Corps (1991–1992); 4th United States Deputy Secretary of Transportation (1989–1991); Chair of the Federal Maritime Commission (1988–1989); Commissioner of the Federal Maritime Commission (1988–1989)	

==== Steven G. Bradbury (acting) ====
With the resignation of Chao, her deputy, Steven G. Bradbury became acting Secretary on January 11, 2021, and served for the final days until the end of the Trump administration, on January 20, 2021.

=== Secretary of Energy ===
The nomination of a Secretary-designate is reviewed during hearings held by the members of the Energy and Natural Resources committee, then presented to the full Senate for a vote.

==== Grace Bochenek (acting) ====
Grace Bochenek served as acting secretary from January 20 until March 2, 2017.

==== Rick Perry (2017–2019) ====
President-elect Trump announced his selection of Rick Perry, former Governor of Texas as Secretary of Energy on December 13, 2016. During a previous presidential campaign, Perry said he intended to abolish the department. His nomination was approved by a 16–7 vote from the United States Senate Committee on Energy and Natural Resources on January 31, 2017. On March 2, 2017, Perry was confirmed by the Senate in a vote of 62–37.

On October 17, 2019, Perry informed President Trump that he planned to resign by the end of the year. On October 18, 2019, Trump nominated the Deputy Secretary of Energy, Dan Brouillette, to replace him; Perry left in early December.

Secretary of Energy
Portrait	Name	Date of birth	State	Background	Reference
	Rick Perry	March 4, 1950 (age 76)	Texas	Candidate for President of the United States in 2012 and 2016; 47th Governor of Texas (2000–2015); 39th Lieutenant Governor of Texas (1999–2000); 9th Agriculture Commissioner of Texas (1991–1999); Member of the Texas House of Representatives from the 64th district (1985–1991)	

==== Dan Brouillette (2019–2021) ====
Dan Brouillette, the Deputy Secretary, served as acting secretary from December 2 until December 4, 2019. He was confirmed by the Senate in a vote of 70–15, on December 2, 2019. He served until the end of the Trump administration, on January 20, 2021.

Secretary of Energy
Portrait	Name	Date of birth	State	Background	Reference
	Dan Brouillette	August 18, 1962 (age 64)	Texas	19th United States Deputy Secretary of Energy (2017–2019); Assistant Secretary of Energy for Congressional and Intergovernmental Affairs (2001–2003)	

=== Secretary of Education ===
The nomination of a Secretary-designate is reviewed during hearings held by the members of the Health, Education, Labor and Pensions Committee, then presented to the full Senate for a vote.

==== Phil Rosenfelt (acting) ====
Phil Rosenfelt served as acting secretary from January 20 until February 7, 2017.

==== Betsy DeVos (2017–2021) ====
President-elect Trump officially announced the selection of former RNC member Betsy DeVos from Michigan as Secretary of Education on November 23, 2016.

Originally scheduled for January 11, but was postponed because the Office of Government Ethics had not completed its review of DeVos' financial holdings and potential conflicts of interest. On January 20, the Office of Government Ethics completed their ethics report on DeVos, three days after her hearing with the Committee on Health, Education, Labor and Pensions was held. Senate Democrats requested a second hearing for DeVos after the ethics report was released, but committee chair Senator Lamar Alexander denied it. DeVos repeatedly said she would divest from 102 companies within ninety days if confirmed. On February 7, 2017, the full senate voted 51–50 – with Vice President Pence casting the tie-breaking vote – to confirm DeVos, with Pence becoming the first vice president to cast the tie-breaking vote for a cabinet nominee ever. DeVos resigned on January 7, 2021, due to the January 6 U.S. Capitol attack, effective the next day.

Secretary of Education
Portrait	Name	Date of birth	State	Background	Reference
	Betsy DeVos	January 8, 1958 (age 68)	Michigan	Chair of the Michigan Republican Party (1996–2000; 2003–2005)	

==== Mick Zais (acting) ====
Deputy Secretary Mick Zais succeeded DeVos in an acting capacity on January 8, 2021, and served for the final days until the end of the Trump administration, on January 20, 2021.

=== Secretary of Veterans Affairs ===
The nomination of a Secretary-designate is reviewed during hearings held by the members of the Veterans Affairs committee, then presented to the full Senate for a vote.

==== Robert Snyder (acting) ====
Robert Snyder served as acting secretary from January 20 until February 14, 2017.

==== David Shulkin (2017–2018) ====
On January 11, 2017, David Shulkin, the Under Secretary of Veterans Affairs for Health under President Barack Obama, was selected to be the Secretary of Veterans Affairs. On February 13, he was confirmed by the Senate in a vote of 100–0. He assumed office on February 14, 2017.

In February 2018, the VA inspector general issued a report criticizing Shulkin for misusing department funds to pay for his and his wife's personal travel. On March 28, President Trump fired him.

Secretary of Veterans Affairs
Portrait	Name	Date of birth	State	Background	Reference
	David Shulkin	July 22, 1959 (age 68)	Pennsylvania	Under Secretary of Veterans Affairs for Health (2015–2017)	

==== Robert Wilkie (acting) ====
Robert Wilkie served as acting secretary from March 28 until May 29, 2018.

==== Peter O'Rourke (acting) ====
Peter O'Rourke served as acting secretary from May 29 until July 30, 2018.

==== Failed nomination of Ronny Jackson ====
President Trump initially said he would replace Shulkin with Ronny Jackson, his White House personal physician. Senators expressed skepticism of the nomination due to Jackson's lack of management experience. Current and former employees on the White House Medical Unit accused Jackson of creating a hostile work environment, excessively drinking on the job, and improperly dispensing medication. Trump defended Jackson as "one of the finest people that I have met", but hinted that Jackson might withdraw from being considered for the position. Jackson withdrew his nomination on April 26.

==== Robert Wilkie (2018–2021) ====
President Trump nominated Former Defense Undersecretary and VA Acting Secretary Robert Wilkie on May 18, 2018, to replace Shulkin. On July 23, 2018, Wilkie was confirmed by the Senate in a vote of 86–9. He served until the end of the Trump administration, on January 20, 2021.

Secretary of Veterans Affairs
Portrait	Name	Date of birth	State	Background	Reference
	Robert Wilkie	August 2, 1962 (age 64)	North Carolina	8th Under Secretary of Defense for Personnel and Readiness (2017–2018); 25th Assistant Secretary of Defense for Legislative Affairs (2006–2009)	

=== Secretary of Homeland Security ===
The nomination of a Secretary-designate is reviewed during hearings held by the members of the Homeland Security and Governmental Affairs committee, then presented to the full Senate for a vote.

==== John F. Kelly (2017) ====
President-elect Trump announced the selection of John F. Kelly, retired four-star Marine general as Secretary of Homeland Security on December 7, 2016. He was confirmed by the Senate in a vote of 88–11 and sworn in on the evening of January 20. Kelly's term ended on July 28, 2017, following his appointment as White House Chief of Staff.

Secretary of Homeland Security
Portrait	Name	Date of birth	State	Background	Reference
	John F. Kelly	May 11, 1950 (age 76)	Massachusetts	Commander of the United States Southern Command (2012–2016)	

==== Elaine Duke (acting) ====
Elaine Duke served as acting secretary from July 31 until December 6, 2017.

==== Kirstjen Nielsen (2017–2019) ====
On October 11, 2017, multiple sources reported President Trump's interest in nominating Kirstjen Nielsen as Secretary of Homeland Security. She had served as Principal Deputy White House Chief of Staff to Chief of Staff John F. Kelly. On December 5, 2017, she was confirmed by the Senate confirmed in a vote of 62–37. She took office the next day. On April 7, 2019, Nielsen resigned, with effect on April 11.

Secretary of Homeland Security
Portrait	Name	Date of birth	State	Background	Reference
	Kirstjen Nielsen	May 14, 1972 (age 54)	Florida	White House Principal Deputy Chief of Staff (2017); Chief of Staff to the United States Secretary of Homeland Security (2017)	

==== Kevin McAleenan (acting) ====
Kevin McAleenan served as acting secretary from April 11 until November 13, 2019, when he resigned.

==== Chad Wolf (acting) ====
Chad Wolf served as acting secretary from November 13, 2019, until he resigned on January 11, 2021.

==== Pete Gaynor (acting) ====
Pete Gaynor, Administrator of the Federal Emergency Management Agency, succeeded Wolf in an acting capacity on January 12, 2021 and served for the final days until the end of the Trump administration, on January 20, 2021.

== Nominated candidates for Cabinet-level positions ==
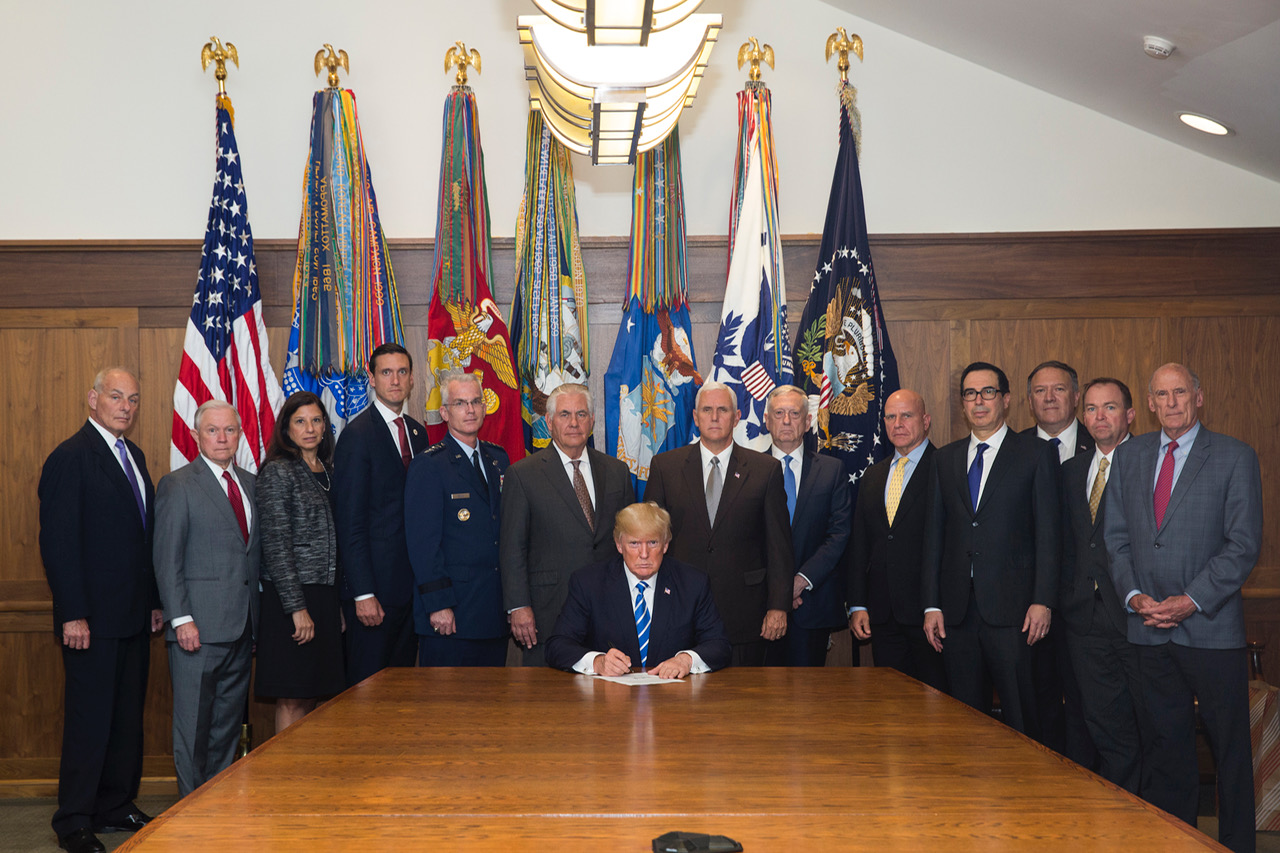
Members of Trump's cabinet in August 2017

Cabinet-level officials have positions that are considered to be of Cabinet level, but which are not part of the Cabinet. Which exact positions are considered part of the presidential cabinet, can vary with the president. The CIA and FEMA were cabinet-level agencies under Bill Clinton, but not George W. Bush. The head of the Office of National Drug Control Policy (aka the drug czar) was a cabinet-level position under both Bill Clinton and George W. Bush, but not under Barack Obama. (Not to be confused with the head of the DEA, who has remained in the org chart underneath the cabinet position held by the Attorney General.) Designation of an agency as being cabinet-level requires that Congress enact legislation, although executive orders unilaterally created by the president can be used to create many other types of position inside the executive branch. Members of the cabinet proper, as well as cabinet-level officials, meet with the president in a room adjacent to the Oval Office.

=== White House Chief of Staff ===
The White House Chief of Staff has traditionally been the highest-ranking employee of the White House. The responsibilities of the chief of staff are both managerial and advisory over the president's official business. The chief of staff is appointed by and serves at the pleasure of the president; it does not require Senate confirmation.

==== Reince Priebus (2017) ====
Trump's selection of former RNC chair Reince Priebus from Wisconsin was officially announced on November 13, 2016. This role does not require Senate confirmation. The appointment of Steve Bannon as Chief Strategist was announced simultaneously. Although that strategy-role is not a Cabinet-level position in the statutory sense, in an "unusual arrangement" Priebus and Bannon were envisioned by the Trump transition team as being equal partners, and were announced simultaneously. With Priebus accepting a role within the administration, Ronna Romney McDaniel was elected to replace Priebus in his former role as RNC chair. Priebus resigned on July 28, 2017.

White House Chief of Staff
Portrait	Name	Date of birth	State	Years	Background	Reference
	Reince Priebus	March 18, 1972 (age 54)	Wisconsin	January 20, 2017 – July 31, 2017	Chair of the Republican National Committee (2011–2017); Chair of the Republican Party of Wisconsin (2007–2011)	

==== John F. Kelly (2017–2019) ====
On July 28, 2017, Trump announced his Secretary for Homeland Security, John Kelly, would serve as his chief of staff. On December 8, 2018, Trump announced that Kelly would be leaving as chief of staff.

White House Chief of Staff
Portrait	Name	Date of birth	State	Years	Background	Reference
	John F. Kelly	May 11, 1950 (age 76)	Massachusetts	July 31, 2017 – January 2, 2019	5th United States Secretary of Homeland Security (2017); Commander of the United States Southern Command (2012–2016)	

==== Mick Mulvaney (acting) ====
OMB Director Mick Mulvaney concurrently served as acting White House Chief of Staff from January 2, 2019, until March 31, 2020.

==== Mark Meadows (2020–2021) ====
Mark Meadows replaced Mick Mulvaney on March 31, 2020.

White House Chief of Staff
Portrait	Name	Date of birth	State	Years	Background	Reference
	Mark Meadows	July 28, 1959 (age 67)	North Carolina	March 31, 2020 – January 20, 2021	U.S. representative from NC-11 (2013–2020); Chair of the House Freedom Caucus (2017–2019)	

=== United States Trade Representative ===
The nomination of a Director-designate is reviewed during hearings held by the members of the United States Senate Committee on Finance then presented to the full Senate for a vote.

==== Maria Pagan (acting) ====
Maria Pagan served in this position from January 20 until March 2, 2017.

==== Stephen Vaughn (acting) ====
Stephen Vaughn served in this position from March 2 until May 15, 2017.

==== Robert Lighthizer (2017–2021) ====
On January 3, 2017, Robert Lighthizer, a former Deputy United States Trade Representative under President Ronald Reagan, was selected to be the United States Trade Representative. Due to Lighthizer's prior representation of foreign governments with a trade dispute with the United States, he will first need to obtain a special waiver to bypass the Lobbying Disclosure Act. The waiver would need to pass Congress and have the President's signature to assume the position. Congress waived the ban for Charlene Barshefsky, President Clinton's choice for Trade Representative in 1997. Lighthizer was confirmed as U.S. Trade Representative on May 11, 2017, by a margin of 82–14.

United States Trade Representative
Portrait	Name	Date of birth	State	Background	Reference
	Robert Lighthizer	October 11, 1947 (age 79)	Florida	1st United States Deputy Trade Representative (1983–1985)	

=== Director of National Intelligence ===
==== Mike Dempsey (acting) ====
Mike Dempsey served in this position from January 20 until March 15, 2017.

==== Dan Coats (2017–2019) ====
On January 7, 2017, Dan Coats, former senator of Indiana, was officially selected to be the Director of National Intelligence. On March 15, 2017, Coats was confirmed by the Senate by a vote of 85–12. On August 15, 2019, Coats resigned from his position as Director of National Intelligence.

Director of the Central Intelligence Agency
Portrait	Name	Date of birth	State	Background	Reference
	Dan Coats	May 16, 1943 (age 83)	Indiana	United States senator from Indiana (1989–1999; 2011–2017); Chair of the Joint Economic Committee (2015–2017); United States Ambassador to Germany (2001–2005); U.S. representative from IN-4 (1981–1989)	

==== Joseph Maguire (acting) ====
Joseph Maguire took over as acting director on August 16, 2019. He resigned on February 21, 2020.

==== Richard Grenell (acting) ====
Richard Grenell took office as acting director on February 21, 2020, and resigned to take a position in the 2020 Trump Campaign.

==== John Lee Ratcliffe (2020–2021) ====
Former Congressman John Ratcliffe was confirmed and assumed the position May 26, 2020.

Director of the Central Intelligence Agency
Portrait	Name	Date of birth	State	Background	Reference
	John Ratcliffe	October 20, 1965 (age 61)	Texas	U.S. representative from TX-4 (2015–2020); Mayor of Heath, Texas (2004–2012); United States Attorney for the Eastern District of Texas (2007–2008)	

=== Ambassador to the United Nations ===
Like all ambassadorships and all official Cabinet positions, the nominee for this ambassador to the U.N. requires confirmation by the Senate. The nomination of an Ambassador-designate to the United Nations is reviewed during hearings held by the members of the Senate Foreign Relations Committee, and then presented to the full Senate for a vote.

==== Michele Sison (acting) ====
Michele J. Sison served in this position from January 20 until January 27, 2017.

==== Nikki Haley (2017–2018) ====
Trump officially announced Governor Nikki Haley from South Carolina as his selection for this role on November 23, 2016. She was confirmed on January 24, 2017, and subsequently resigned as South Carolina governor. Haley supported Marco Rubio in the Republican primaries and caucuses, but later endorsed Trump as the presumptive Republican nominee. Haley's lieutenant governor, Henry McMaster, who was an early supporter of Trump, was also under consideration for a role in the Trump administration, but since he did not accept such a role, he succeeded to the governorship of South Carolina upon Haley's resignation. On October 9, 2018, Haley announced that she was resigning her position as Ambassador effective at the end of 2018.

U.S. Ambassador to the United Nations
Portrait	Name	Date of birth	State	Background	Reference
	Nikki Haley	January 20, 1972 (age 54)	South Carolina	116th Governor of South Carolina (2011–2017); Member of the South Carolina House of Representatives from the 87th district (2005–2011)	

==== Jonathan Cohen (acting) ====
Jonathan Cohen served in this position from June 8 until November 17, 2019.

==== Failed nomination of Heather Nauert ====
On December 7, 2018, Trump nominated Heather Nauert for UN Ambassador. Nauert withdrew her nomination on February 22, 2019.

==== Kelly Craft (2019–2021) ====
On February 22, 2019, Ambassador Kelly Craft was nominated by President Donald Trump to replace Nikki Haley, who had resigned two months prior, as his envoy to the United Nations. Craft was confirmed on July 31, 2019.

U.S. Ambassador to the United Nations
Portrait	Name	Date of birth	State	Background	Reference
	Kelly Craft	February 24, 1962 (age 64)	Kentucky	31st United States Ambassador to Canada (2017–2019)	

=== Director of the Office of Management and Budget ===
The nomination of a Director-designate is reviewed during hearings held by the members of the Homeland Security and Governmental Affairs Committee and Budget Committee then presented to the full Senate for a vote.

==== Mark Sandy (acting) ====
Mark Sandy served in this position from January 20 until February 16, 2017.

==== Mick Mulvaney (2017–2020) ====
On December 13, 2016, Mick Mulvaney, U.S. Representative for South Carolina's 5th congressional district, was selected to be the Director of the Office of Management and Budget.

In his statement to the Senate Budget Committee, Mulvaney admitted that he had failed to pay $15,000 in payroll taxes from 2000 to 2004 for a nanny he had hired to care for his triplets. Mulvaney said he did not pay the taxes because he viewed the woman as a babysitter rather than as a household employee. After filling out a questionnaire from the Trump transition team, he realized the lapse and began the process of paying back taxes and fees. Senate Democrats noted that Republicans had previously insisted that past Democratic nominees' failure to pay taxes for their household employees was disqualifying, including former Health and Human Services nominee Tom Daschle in 2009.

Budget Chairman Senator Mike Enzi (R-Wyoming) noted on the Senate floor, "According to Senate records from President Jimmy Carter to President Obama, the longest it has ever taken to approve a first budget director for a new president was one week – one week." On February 16, 2017, the Senate confirmed Mulvaney, 51–49.

Director of the Office of Management and Budget
Portrait	Name	Date of birth	State	Background	Reference
	Mick Mulvaney	July 21, 1967 (age 59)	South Carolina	U.S. representative from SC-5 (2011–2017); Member of the South Carolina Senate from the 16th district (2009–2011); Member of the South Carolina House of Representatives from the 45th district (2007–2009)	

==== Russell Vought (acting) ====
Russell Vought has served in this position from January 2, 2019 until July 22, 2020, when he was sworn in.

==== Russell Vought (2020–2021) ====
On January 2, 2019, President Trump announced that he would nominate Russell Vought to be the OMB director. On July 20, 2020, Vought was confirmed by the Senate in a 51–45 vote, officially giving him the post.

Director of the Office of Management and Budget
Portrait	Name	Date of birth	State	Background	Reference
	Russell Vought	March 26, 1976 (age 50)	Virginia	Deputy Director of the Office of Management and Budget (2018–2020)	

=== Director of the Central Intelligence Agency ===
On February 8, 2017, President Trump outlined the 24 members of the Cabinet with the Director of the Central Intelligence Agency being newly included. The nomination of a Director-designate is reviewed during hearings held by the members of the United States Senate Select Committee on Intelligence and then presented to the full Senate for a vote.

==== Meroe Park (acting) ====
Meroe Park served in this position from January 20 until January 23, 2017.

==== Mike Pompeo (2017–2018) ====
On November 18, 2016, Mike Pompeo, the Representative of Kansas's 4th congressional district, was officially selected to be the Director of the Central Intelligence Agency. He was confirmed by the United States Senate on January 23, 2017, with a vote of 66–32. Pompeo was opposed by 30 Democratic Senators while the sole Republican vote against him came from Rand Paul. He was sworn in on the same night by Vice President Mike Pence.

On March 13, 2018, Pompeo was named as secretary designate of the State Department following the dismissal of Rex Tillerson.

Director of the Central Intelligence Agency
Portrait	Name	Date of birth	State	Background	Reference
	Mike Pompeo	December 30, 1963 (age 62)	Kansas	U.S. representative from KS-4 (2011–2017)	

==== Gina Haspel (acting) ====
Gina Haspel served in this position from April 26, 2018, until May 21 when she was sworn in.

==== Gina Haspel (2018–2021) ====
On March 13, 2018, President Trump announced via Twitter that he would nominate Gina Haspel to be the CIA director. On May 17, Haspel was confirmed by the Senate in a 54–45 vote, officially giving her the post, and making her the first full-time female CIA director.

Director of the Central Intelligence Agency
Portrait	Name	Date of birth	State	Background	Reference
	Gina Haspel	October 1, 1956 (age 70)	Kentucky	6th Deputy Director of the Central Intelligence Agency (2017–2018)	

=== Administrator of the Environmental Protection Agency ===
The nomination of an Administrator-designate is reviewed during hearings held by the members of the Environment and Public Works Committee, then presented to the full Senate for a vote.

==== Catherine McCabe (acting) ====
Catherine McCabe served in this position from January 20 until February 17, 2017.

==== Scott Pruitt (2017–2018) ====
On December 7, 2016, Scott Pruitt, Attorney General of Oklahoma was selected to be the Administrator of the Environmental Protection Agency. In response to the nomination, Pruitt said, "I intend to run this agency in a way that fosters both responsible protection of the environment and freedom for American businesses."

During his January 18 confirmation hearing, Pruitt's testimony openly acknowledged climate change. Pruitt declared the EPA has a "very important role" in regulating carbon dioxide emissions. Pruitt has sued the Environmental Protection Agency as the Attorney General of Oklahoma on more than a dozen occasions. When pressed by Senator Ed Markey on whether he would recuse himself from ongoing lawsuits, Pruitt "would not commit to recusing himself from all the cases he had brought." Pruitt deflected questioning from Senator Bernie Sanders (I-Vt.) on the issue of whether human activity is largely responsible for climate change. Stating, "I believe the ability to measure, with precision, the degree of human activity's impact on the climate is subject to more debate on whether the climate is changing or whether human activity contributes to it." Pruitt declined to comment on whether California could set its own emission standards and said he would review the policy.

Amid 15 federal investigations of his conduct ranging from criminal record destruction to corrupt allocation of funds and abuse of power, Pruitt announced he would resign from office on July 6, 2018, leaving Andrew R. Wheeler as the acting head of the agency.

Administrator of the Environmental Protection Agency
Portrait	Name	Date of birth	State	Background	Reference
	Scott Pruitt	May 9, 1968 (age 58)	Oklahoma	17th Attorney General of Oklahoma (2011–2017); Member of the Oklahoma Senate (1999–2007)	

==== Andrew Wheeler (acting) ====
Andrew R. Wheeler served in this position from July 9, 2018, until February 28, 2019, when he was sworn in.

==== Andrew Wheeler (2019–2021) ====
On November 16, 2018, President Trump nominated Acting Administrator Andrew Wheeler to the position full-time. Wheeler was confirmed by the senate on February 28, 2019, with a 52–47 vote.

Administrator of the Environmental Protection Agency
Portrait	Name	Date of birth	State	Background	Reference
	Andrew R. Wheeler	December 23, 1964 (age 61)	Virginia	Deputy Administrator of the Environmental Protection Agency (2018–2019)	

=== Administrator of the Small Business Administration ===
The nomination of an Administrator-designate is reviewed during hearings held by the members of the United States Senate Committee on Small Business and Entrepreneurship and then presented to the full Senate for a vote.

==== Joseph Loddo (acting) ====
Joseph Loddo served in this position from January 20 until February 14, 2017.

==== Linda McMahon (2017–2019) ====
On December 7, 2016, Linda McMahon, former CEO of World Wrestling Entertainment Inc. and Senate nominee, was selected to be the head of the Small Business Administration. McMahon was confirmed by a Senate vote of 81–19 on February 14, 2017.

McMahon earned approval votes from Senators Richard Blumenthal and Chris Murphy from Connecticut, who had both defeated McMahon in their respective Senate races. Senator Jim Risch (R-Idaho), chairman of the Senate Committee on Small Businesses and Entrepreneurship, said, "Mrs. McMahon made it very clear that she has the experience, understanding and instincts necessary to bolster America's small business community and advocate for much-needed regulatory reforms."

Administrator of the Small Business Administration
Portrait	Name	Date of birth	State	Background	Reference
	Linda McMahon	October 4, 1948 (age 78)	Connecticut	Member of the Connecticut State Board of Education (2009–2010); Co-founder of World Wrestling Entertainment; Republican nominee for U.S. Senator from Connecticut in 2010 and 2012	

==== Chris Pilkerton (acting) ====
Chris Pilkerton served in this position from April 13, 2019, until January 14, 2020.

==== Jovita Carranza (2020–2021) ====
On April 4, 2019, President Trump nominated Treasurer of the United States Jovita Carranza to the Small Business Administration, replacing Linda McMahon. Carranza was confirmed by a vote of 88–5 in the Senate on January 7, 2020.

Administrator of the Small Business Administration
Portrait	Name	Date of birth	State	Background	Reference
	Jovita Carranza	June 29, 1949 (age 77)	Illinois	44th Treasurer of the United States (2017–2020); Deputy Administrator of the Small Business Administration (2006–2009)	

=== Removal of the Chair of the Council of Economic Advisers ===
On February 8, 2017, President Trump outlined the 24 members of the Cabinet, excluding the Council of Economic Advisers chairman position. In addition to the chairman, the council had two other members, also appointed by the president, as well as a staff of economists, researchers, and statisticians. Historically, appointees to chair the council have held Ph.D.s in economics, and the role of the group is to provide advice in the form of economic analysis with respect to policy, as distinct from shaping economic policy per se.

Trump released a list of his campaign's official economic advisers in August 2016, which simultaneously was anti-establishment and therefore leant on those with governmental experience, yet at the same time aimed to include some members of business and finance. Many of the listed names received media attention as potential appointees to the Council of Economic Advisers, or in other Trump administration roles.

Although removed from the Cabinet, the chair-designate, must be reviewed during hearings held by the members of the United States Senate Committee on Banking, Housing, and Urban Affairs and then presented to the full Senate for a vote.

Various other Trump administration appointees are directly involved with economic matters, for example, former director of the National Economic Council Gary Cohn, former National Trade Council director Peter Navarro, SEC chairman Jay Clayton, OMB director Mick Mulvaney, Treasury secretary Steven Mnuchin, Commerce secretary Wilbur Ross, U.S. Trade Representative Robert Lighthizer and former SBA administrator Linda McMahon. On May 16, 2017, Trump nominated Dr. Kevin Hassett to be chair of the council. He took office on September 13, 2017.

== See also ==
- Second cabinet of Donald Trump
- Political appointments of the first Trump administration
- First inauguration of Donald Trump – 58th United States presidential inauguration
- First presidential transition of Donald Trump – Transfer of presidential power from Barack Obama to Donald Trump
- Kitchen cabinet
