= Hershel Gober =

American politician (1936–2024)

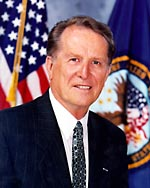

United States Secretary of Veterans Affairs Acting
- In office July 25, 2000 – January 20, 2001
- President: Bill Clinton
- Preceded by: Togo West
- Succeeded by: Anthony Principi
- In office July 13, 1997 – January 2, 1998
- President: Bill Clinton
- Preceded by: Jesse Brown
- Succeeded by: Togo West

United States Deputy Secretary of Veterans Affairs
- In office February 4, 1993 – August 10, 2000
- President: Bill Clinton
- Preceded by: Anthony Principi
- Succeeded by: Leo Mackay

Director of the Arkansas Department of Veterans Affairs
- In office January 4, 1988 – February 4, 1993
- Governor: Bill Clinton; Jim Tucker
- Preceded by: Grady Brown
- Succeeded by: Nick Bacon

Personal details
- Born: Hershel Wayne Gober; December 21, 1936 Monticello, Arkansas, U.S.
- Died: October 15, 2024 (aged 87) Palm Coast, Florida, U.S.
- Party: Democratic
- Education: Alaska Pacific University (BA)

Military service
- Allegiance: United States of America
- Branch/service: United States Army; United States Marine Corps
- Rank: Major (USMC)
- Battles/wars: Vietnam War
- Awards: Purple Heart; Bronze Star

Hershel Wayne Gober (December 21, 1936 – October 15, 2024) was an American government official and Vietnam War veteran. He served as acting United States Secretary of Veterans Affairs (VA) on two occasions during the administration of Bill Clinton: first from July 1, 1997, until January 2, 1998, between the resignation of Secretary Jesse Brown and the appointment of Togo D. West Jr. as acting secretary, and the second time from July 25, 2000, until January 20, 2001, after the resignation of Secretary West; this time Gober served in the post until the end of the Clinton presidency.

Gober was born on December 21, 1936. He started out in the VA as deputy secretary, serving from February 4, 1993, until August 10, 2000. Gober was also briefly secretary-designate, when Clinton named him on July 31, 1997, to replace Jesse Brown. However, the nomination was withdrawn before Senate action on October 27 the same year because of fears that nomination hearings for Gober would become heated due to questions about a 1993 claim of sexual misconduct made against him; he also wished to stay as Deputy Secretary.

During his tenure Gober, as a close and longtime aide, played an important role in the Clinton-era VA. He headed a delegation that traveled to Vietnam to seek the fullest possible accounting of missing veterans. He was also active in improving health care and expanding clinics for veterans.

Before serving in the VA, Gober was director of the Arkansas Department of Veterans Affairs from January 4, 1988, to February 4, 1993, during Clinton's tenure as governor.

Gober died on October 15, 2024, at the age of 87.

== Military service ==
Gober served in the U.S. Marine Corps from 1956 to 1959. He served in the U.S. Army from 1961 to 1978, retiring as a Major.

=== Service in Vietnam ===
Gober served two tours in Vietnam. In addition to his combat duties, at one point he worked with an American-Vietnamese team that produced songs to help sway Vietnamese public opinion in favor of the American and South Vietnamese causes and to encourage the leadership in Washington to favor reaching the hearts and minds of the Vietnamese people. Later, in 1969, he was wounded while serving as a company commander.

== Music ==
In 1970, Gober released a 45 rpm single, "Picture of a Man", which received some airplay on popular music radio stations.

Gober had at least five single releases and one album as a recording artist; the first two were as Hershel Almond on Ace and Challenge in 1959. The others were on ABC ("The Proud American", 1966), "Tee Pee" (1967) and "Buddah" (1969).

== See also ==
- Unsuccessful nominations to the Cabinet of the United States

Political offices
Preceded by Anthony Principi	United States Deputy Secretary of Veterans Affairs; 1993–2000	Succeeded by Leo Mackay
Preceded by Jesse Brown	United States Secretary of Veterans Affairs; Acting; 1997–1998	Succeeded by Togo West
Preceded by Togo West	United States Secretary of Veterans Affairs; Acting; 2000–2001	Succeeded by Anthony Principi
