= The Garment Worker =

Sculpture in New York City

Coordinates: 40°45′15″N 73°59′17″W

- Artist: Judith Weller
- Year: 1984
- Medium: Bronze
- Subject: Male garment worker
- Location: New York City, New York, U.S.

The Garment Worker, created by Judith Weller, is a realistic rendering of a garment worker, wearing a yarmulke and bent over a hand-operated sewing machine. The sculpture is based on Weller's father, who was a machine operator in the garment industry in New York.

The sculpture was made as a tribute to the Jewish garment workers who, at the turn of the 20th century, were the foundation of Jewish life in New York. It stands as a symbol of their hard work, perseverance, and the vital role they played in shaping the city’s garment sector and its immigrant community.

The sculpture measures approximately 6 1/2 feet in height, 4 feet in width, and 4 feet in depth. The base of the sculpture adds an additional height of 1 foot.

== History ==
The Garment Worker sculpture was created by Israeli artist Judith Weller, who was born in Tel Aviv in 1937. In 1957, Weller moved to New York City as part of a cultural exchange program between Israel and the United States, where she eventually made her home. Her experiences in the city inspired much of her work, particularly the depiction of the laborers in New York's garment industry. In 1978, Weller first exhibited a smaller version of the Garment Worker, standing at 60 cm (24 inches), at an exhibition hosted by the National Sculpture Society. The piece resonated with an exhibition visitor, who commissioned Weller to create a larger version for public display. This led to the creation of the full-scale sculpture that now occupies a public location in New York City.
