= Gordon H. Mansfield =

American military veteran

Gordon Mansfield
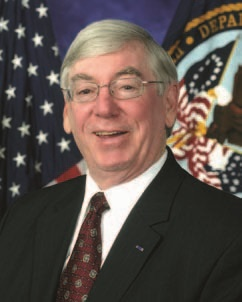
- Official portrait, c. 2005

United States Secretary of Veterans Affairs
- Acting; October 1, 2007 – December 20, 2007
- President: George W. Bush
- Preceded by: Jim Nicholson
- Succeeded by: James Peake

5th United States Deputy Secretary of Veterans Affairs
- In office January 22, 2004 – January 20, 2009
- President: George W. Bush
- Preceded by: Leo Mackay
- Succeeded by: Scott Gould

Personal details
- Born: September 15, 1941 Pittsfield, Massachusetts, U.S.
- Died: January 29, 2013 (aged 71) Washington, D.C., U.S.
- Party: Republican
- Education: Villanova University (BA); American University; University of Miami (JD); Christendom College

Military service
- Allegiance: United States
- Branch/service: United States Army
- Years of service: 1964–1968
- Rank: Captain
- Unit: 101st Airborne Division
- Battles/wars: Vietnam War
- Awards: Distinguished Service Cross; Bronze Star; Purple Heart (2); Combat Infantryman Badge

Gordon Hall Mansfield (September 15, 1941 – January 29, 2013) was an American military veteran who was Deputy Secretary of Veterans Affairs between 2004 and 2009.

== Political career ==
Mansfield was nominated to serve as Deputy Secretary of Veterans Affairs by President George W. Bush on November 3, 2003, and confirmed by the United States Senate on January 22, 2004. He previously served as VA Assistant Secretary for Congressional and Legislative Affairs since August 1, 2001. From October 1, 2007 until December 20, 2007 he was the Acting Secretary of Veterans Affairs after Jim Nicholson resigned as Secretary. He served as Acting Secretary until President Bush's nominee, Retired U.S. Army Surgeon General James Peake was sworn in on December 20, 2007. He term as Deputy Secretary ended in January 2009.

Prior to his appointment, Mansfield served as the legislative advisor to the Secretary of Veterans Affairs and was responsible for VA's Congressional relations and for representing VA programs, policies, investigations and legislative agenda to Congress.

Prior to joining VA, Mansfield served as executive director of the Paralyzed Veterans of America (PVA) since April 1993. In that position, he oversaw daily operation of PVA's national office in Washington, D.C. Mansfield held a number of positions at PVA from 1981 to 1989, and served as the organization's first associate executive director of Government Relations.

Mansfield served as Assistant Secretary for Fair Housing and Equal Opportunity at the Department of Housing and Urban Development from 1989 to 1993 under President George H. W. Bush’s Administration. Prior to 1981, he practiced law in Ocala, Florida.

== Education ==
Mansfield received his undergraduate degree from Villanova University. While recovering from wounds sustained in Vietnam, he began law school at American University, and eventually graduated from the University of Miami.

== Military service ==
Following his 1964 enlistment in the Army, Mansfield served two tours of duty in Vietnam. While serving as company commander with the 101st Airborne Division during his second tour, he was wounded during the Tet Offensive on February 4, 1968, when an enemy soldier feigning death shot him. Mansfield sustained a spinal cord injury, but remained with his soldiers and made sure that the wounded were evacuated before he was medevaced to a Navy Hospital, and was later sent to the National Naval Medical Center in Bethesda, Maryland to recover. Mansfield was discharged in September 1968.

== Awards ==
For his actions while his unit was under fire, he was decorated with the Distinguished Service Cross. He was medically retired by the U.S. Army at the grade of Captain. His other combat decorations include the Bronze Star, two Purple Hearts, the Combat Infantryman Badge and the Presidential Unit Citation.

Mansfield is a recipient of the Presidential Distinguished Service Award and the Villanova University Alumni Human Relations Medal. He was inducted into the 2006 National Spinal Cord Injury Hall of Fame, and into the U.S. Army Officer Candidate School Hall of Fame in 1997. In February 2009 Mansfield joined the Board of Directors of the Disabled Veterans’ LIFE Memorial Foundation.

In October 2010, Mansfield was honored by the Veteran's Group Soldier On at the official opening of the Gordon H. Mansfield Veterans Community in Pittsfield, Massachusetts, in honor of his efforts for veterans. In attendance were dignitaries such as Massachusetts Congressman John Olver, CEO of Soldier On Jack Downing and Director of Homeless Programs for the Veterans Administration Peter Dougherty, who, with Mansfield's wife Linda, unveiled a large bronze bas relief of Mansfield by sculptor Andrew DeVries that marks the entrance to the community.

== Death ==
Mansfield died of an aortic disease in Washington, D.C., on January 29, 2013.

Political offices
| Preceded by Leo Mackay | United States Deputy Secretary of Veterans Affairs; 2004–2009 | Succeeded by Scott Gould |
| Preceded by Jim Nicholson | United States Secretary of Veterans Affairs; Acting; 2007 | Succeeded by James Peake |
