= Robert Snyder (civil servant) =

American politician & military officer

Bob Snyder
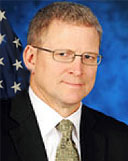

Acting United States Secretary of Veterans Affairs
- In office January 20, 2017 – February 14, 2017
- President: Donald Trump
- Preceded by: Robert A. McDonald
- Succeeded by: David Shulkin

Personal details
- Born: Ravenswood, West Virginia, U.S.
- Education: United States Military Academy (BS); Massachusetts Institute of Technology (MA); National Defense University (MA)

Robert Snyder is a former United States soldier and former interim Chief of Staff of the United States Department of Veterans Affairs since January 2016.

From January 20, 2017, to February 13, 2017, he served as the Acting Secretary of Veterans Affairs.

Political offices
Preceded by Bob McDonald	United States Secretary of Veterans Affairs; Acting; 2017	Succeeded by David Shulkin
