= Eric Shinseki =

American general and VA secretary (born 1942)

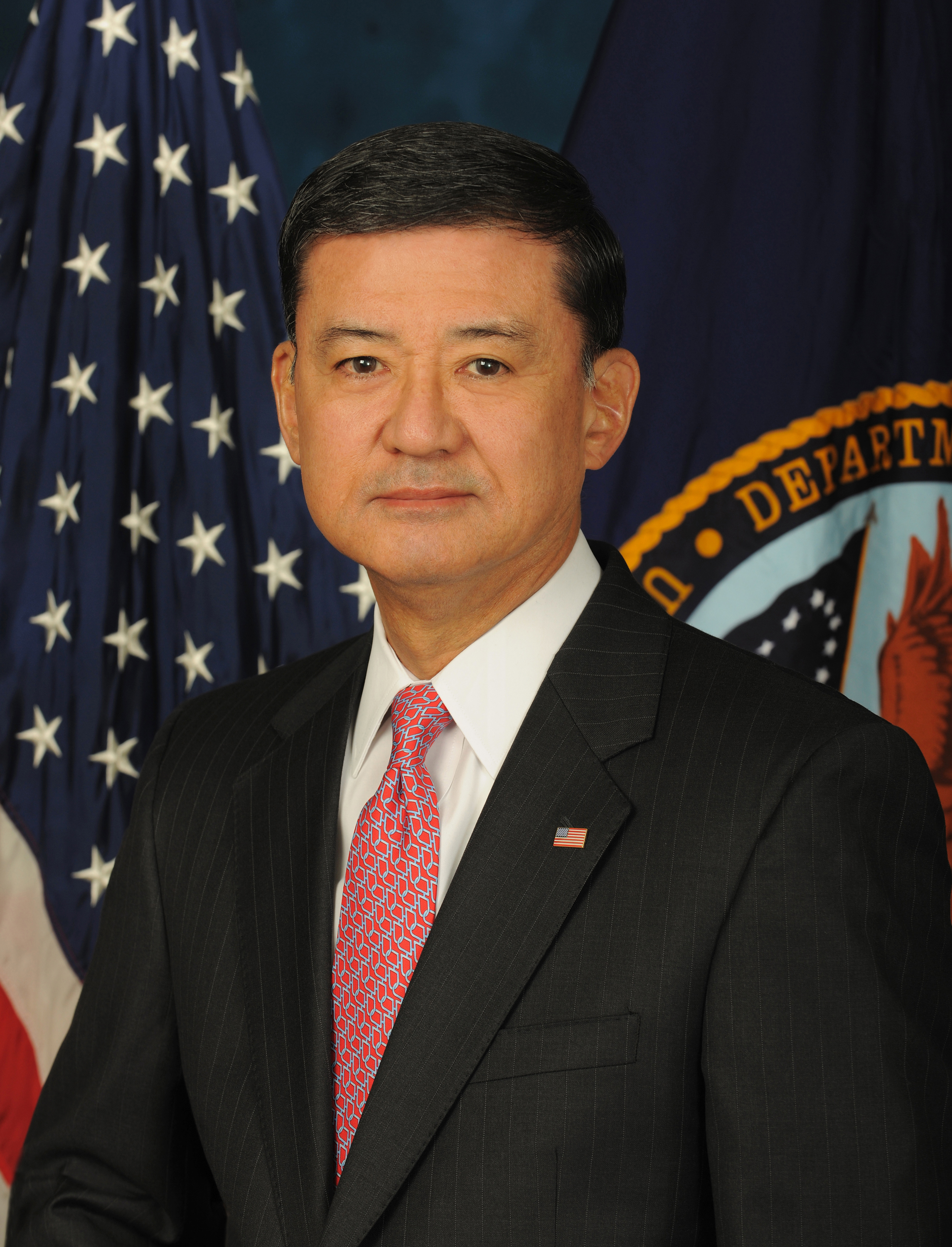
- Official portrait, 2009

7th United States Secretary of Veterans Affairs
- In office 21 January 2009 – 30 May 2014
- President: Barack Obama
- Deputy: W. Scott Gould; Sloan D. Gibson
- Preceded by: James Peake
- Succeeded by: Bob McDonald

Personal details
- Born: 28 November 1942 (age 83) Lihue, Hawaii, U.S.
- Spouse: Patricia Shinseki
- Children: 2
- Education: United States Military Academy (BS); Duke University (MA)

Military service
- Allegiance: United States
- Branch/service: United States Army
- Years of service: 1965–2003
- Rank: General
- Commands: Chief of Staff of the United States Army; Vice Chief of Staff of the United States Army; Seventh United States Army; Allied Land Forces Central Europe; NATO Stabilization Force in Bosnia and Herzegovina; 1st Cavalry Division; 2nd Brigade, 3rd Infantry Division; 3rd Squadron, 7th Cavalry Regiment
- Battles/wars: Vietnam War; Bosnian War
- Awards: Defense Distinguished Service Medal (2); Army Distinguished Service Medal (2); Navy Distinguished Service Medal; Air Force Distinguished Service Medal; Coast Guard Distinguished Service Medal; Legion of Merit (2); Bronze Star Medal (3); Purple Heart (2)
- Shinseki's voice Shinseki at a Senate Veterans' Affairs Committee hearing on Veterans Health Administration issues. Recorded May 15, 2014

Eric Ken Shinseki (/ʃɪnˈsɛki/, Japanese: 新関 健, romanized: Shinseki Ken; born 28 November 1942) is an American retired general who served as the seventh United States secretary of veterans affairs from 2009 to 2014 and as the 34th chief of staff of the United States Army from 1999 to 2003. Shinseki is a veteran of two tours of combat in the Vietnam War, in which he was awarded three Bronze Star Medals for valor and two Purple Hearts. He was the first Asian-American four-star general, and the first Asian-American Secretary of Veterans Affairs.

Shinseki was born in Lihue, Hawaii, to a Japanese-American family with a history of service in the United States Army during World War II. He graduated from the United States Military Academy in 1965, being commissioned as a Field Artillery Branch officer, and went on to serve two tours in Vietnam during the 1960s. Shinseki later transferred to the Armor Branch, and held staff assignments during the 1970s. His command assignments later included the 3rd Squadron, 7th Cavalry Regiment, in 1981; the 2nd Brigade, 3rd Infantry Division, from 1987 to 1989; and the 1st Cavalry Division from 1994 to 1995. From 1997 to 1998, Shinseki concurrently served as the commander of United States Army Europe and United States Seventh Army; Allied Land Forces Central Europe; and the Stabilisation Force in Bosnia and Herzegovina.

In 1998, he became the 28th vice chief of staff of the United States Army. As the chief of staff from 1999, Shinseki developed a plan for the Army to deploy units to combat zones more quickly, and created the Stryker Brigade Combat Teams. He also made the black beret part of the uniform for all soldiers and officers. Leading up to the 2003 invasion of Iraq, he publicly disagreed with Donald Rumsfeld and Paul Wolfowitz over the invasion plan, saying that many more troops would be needed than what they intended to use. After his retirement from the Army, he was later appointed in 2008 as the secretary of veterans affairs by President Barack Obama. Shinseki resigned over the Veterans Health Administration controversy of 2014. He has also served on the boards of several companies and organizations.

== Early life and education ==
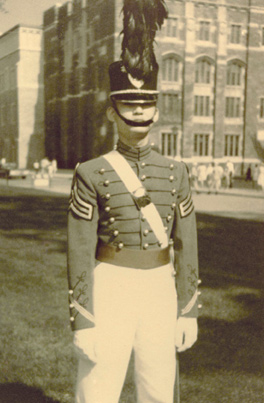
Shinseki as a West Point cadet in 1965

Shinseki was born in Lihue, Kauaʻi, in the then Territory of Hawaii, to an American family of Japanese ancestry. His grandparents emigrated from Hiroshima to Hawaii in 1901. He grew up in a sugarcane plantation community on Kaua'i and graduated from Kaua'i High and Intermediate School in 1960. While attending Kaua'i he was active in the Boy Scouts and served as class president. As a boy, Shinseki learned that three of his uncles had served in the 442nd Infantry Regiment, a unit of Japanese Americans that became one of the most decorated fighting units in United States history.

Motivated by his uncles' example, he attended the United States Military Academy and graduated in 1965 with a Bachelor of Science degree and a commission as a second lieutenant. He earned a Master of Arts degree in English Literature from Duke University in 1974. He was also educated at the Armor Officer Advanced Course, the United States Army Command and General Staff College in 1979, and the National War College of National Defense University in 1986.

== Army service ==
After being commissioned as a Field Artillery Branch officer, Shinseki served in the Republic of Vietnam from 1965 to 1966 as an artillery forward observer in 2nd Battalion, 9th Field Artillery Regiment, 25th Infantry Division. While there, he was awarded the Bronze Star Medal, the Purple Heart, and the Air Medal. From 1966 to 1968, he served at Schofield Barracks, Hawai'i, with Headquarters, United States Army Hawaii, as the assistant secretary of the general staff, and then as the secretary. Shinseki then served as commander of Troop A, 3rd Squadron, 5th Cavalry Regiment, 9th Infantry Divisoon, from 1969 to 1970. While serving as a forward artillery observer, he stepped on a land mine, which blew the front off one of his feet; after spending almost a year recovering from his injuries, he returned to active duty in 1971. In the latter tour, he was awarded two Bronze Stars with valor and a Purple Heart.

Shinseki transferred from artillery to the Armor Branch. He served at Fort Shafter with Headquarters, United States Army Pacific, in Operational Group 1, from 1971 to 1974. After completing his studies at Duke University in 1976, he taught in the U.S. Military Academy's Department of English until 1978. Shinseki then attended the Army Command and General Staff College, graduating in 1979. During duty with the 3rd Armored Cavalry Regiment at Fort Bliss, Texas, he served as the regimental adjutant and as the executive officer of its 1st Squadron, from 1979 to 1981. Shinseki also served in the Office of the Deputy Chief of Staff for Operations and Plans of the Army from 1981 to 1982.

He served as commander, 3rd Squadron, 7th Cavalry, 3rd Infantry Division (Schweinfurt), in 1981; and as assistant chief of staff for operations, plans and training, G3, 3rd Infantry Division (Würzburg), from 1982 to 1985. After completing the National War College in 1986, he served again in the Office of the Deputy Chief of Staff for Operations and Plans, until 1987. He then became the commander, 2nd Brigade, 3rd Infantry Division (Kitzingen), from 1987 to 1989; and then assistant chief of staff for operations, plans, and training), G3, of VII Corps (Stuttgart), until 1990.

Shinseki served as Deputy Chief of Staff for Support, Allied Land Forces Southern Europe (Verona), an element of the Allied Forces Southern Europe, from 1990 to 1992. He then became the assistant division commander for maneuver, 3rd Infantry Division (Schweinfurt), until 1993. That year, he briefly served as director of training in the Office of the Deputy Chief of Staff for Operations. From March 1994 to July 1995, Shinseki commanded the 1st Cavalry Division at Fort Hood, Texas. During 1995 he began serving as the assistant deputy chief of staff, before becoming the deputy chief of staff for operations and plans, United States Army, in July 1996. He was also promoted to lieutenant general.

In June 1997, Shinseki was appointed to the four-star rank of general, before assuming duties as Commanding General, United States Army Europe and Seventh Army; Commander, Allied Land Forces Central Europe; and Commander, NATO Stabilization Force in Bosnia and Herzegovina, from 5 August 1997. He relinquished command of the NATO forces on 29 April 1998, and of Army Europe and Seventh Army on 9 November 1998. Shinseki became the Army's 28th Vice Chief of Staff on 24 November 1998.

=== Chief of staff ===
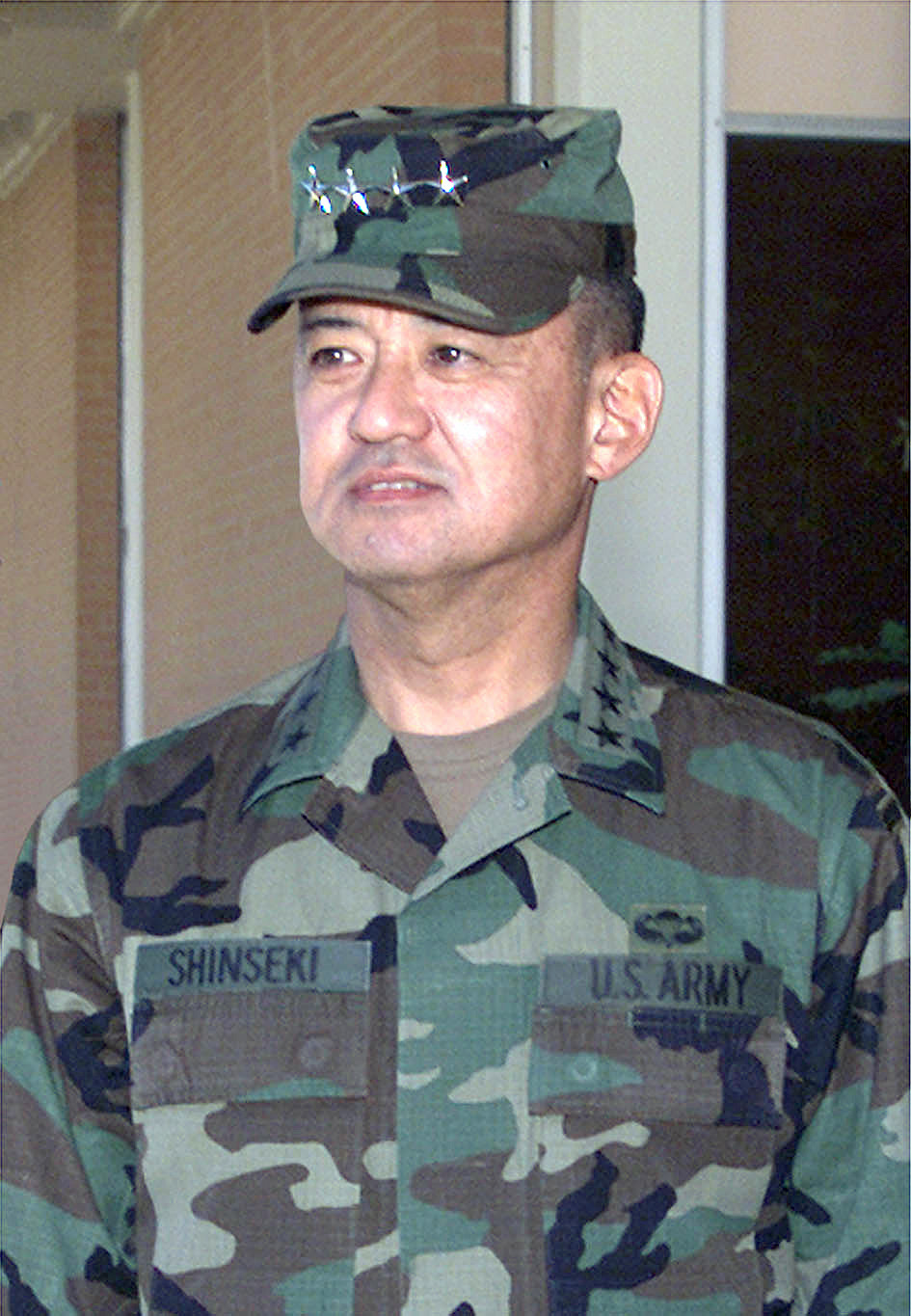
Shinseki as the chief of staff, November 2000

Shinseki took office as the 34th chief of staff of the United States Army on 22 June 1999, succeeding General Dennis Reimer. Shinseki, who had previous experience in the Pentagon, worked with Jack Keane as his vice chief, who had more experience in operational units. In response to criticism of the Army among some for having had a limited role in the Bosnian War and the Kosovo War, Shinseki and Keane devised a plan for Army units to be deployed to combat zones within 96 hours. Shinseki visited wounded Pentagon employees at Walter Reed Army Medical Center in the aftermath of the September 11th attack on the Pentagon.

In October 1999, Shinseki initiated an innovative but controversial plan to make the army more strategically deployable and mobile in urban terrain by creating Stryker Interim-Force Brigade Combat Teams. He conceived a long-term strategic plan for the army dubbed "Objective Force", which included a program he designed, Future Combat Systems. One other controversial plan that Shinseki implemented was the wearing of the black beret for all army personnel. Prior to Shinseki implementing this policy, only the United States Army Rangers could wear the black beret. When the black beret was given to all soldiers and officers, the Rangers moved to the tan beret.

Shinseki at a Pentagon press conference, September 2001

Shinseki publicly clashed with Secretary of Defense Donald Rumsfeld during the planning of the war in Iraq over how many troops the United States would need to keep in Iraq for the postwar occupation of that country. As Army Chief of Staff, Shinseki testified to the United States Senate Committee on Armed Services on 25 February 2003, that "something in the order of several hundred thousand soldiers" would probably be required for postwar Iraq. This was an estimate far higher than the figure being proposed by Secretary Rumsfeld in his invasion plan, and it was rejected in strong language by both Rumsfeld and his Deputy Secretary of Defense, Paul Wolfowitz, who was another chief planner of the invasion and occupation. From then on, Shinseki's influence on the Joint Chiefs of Staff reportedly waned. Critics of the Bush administration alleged that Shinseki was forced into early retirement as Army Chief of Staff because of his comments on troop levels; however, his retirement was announced nearly a year before those comments. Earlier, in April 2002, due to disagreements over the Stryker brigade concept, Rumsfeld announced that he wanted General Keane to become Shinseki's successor, undermining the latter's authority.

Shinseki retired on 11 June 2003, at the end of his four-year term. His Farewell Memo contained some of his ideas regarding the future of the military. Keane became the acting chief of staff upon his retirement, but he declined to take up the post for family reasons, so Peter Schoomaker ultimately became the chief of staff. When the insurgency took hold in postwar Iraq, Shinseki's comments and their public rejection by the civilian leadership were often cited by those who felt the Bush administration deployed too few troops to Iraq. On 15 November 2006, in testimony before Congress, CENTCOM Commander General John Abizaid said that Shinseki had been correct that more troops were needed.

As of 2009, Shinseki was the highest-ranked Asian American military officer in the history of the United States. Additionally, as of 2004, he is the highest-ranked Japanese American to have served in the United States Armed Forces.

== Post-Army career ==
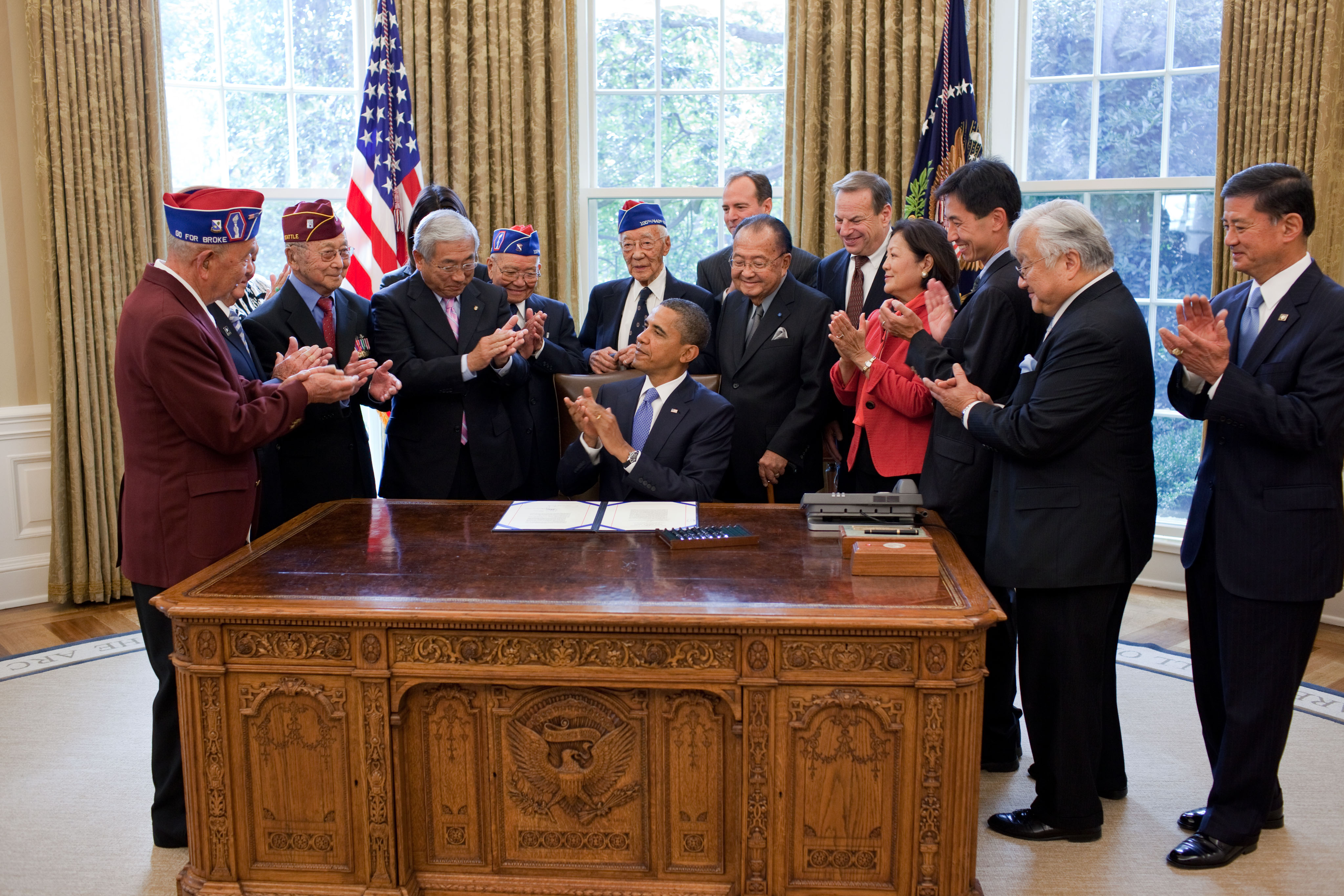
President Barack Obama and guests at signing of bill to grant Congressional Gold Medal to 100th Infantry Battalion and 442nd Regimental Combat Team in recognition of their World War II service. Shinseki is at the far right.

Shinseki has served as a director for several corporations: Honeywell International and Ducommun, military contractors; Grove Farm Corporation; First Hawaiian Bank; and Guardian Life Insurance Company of America. He is a member of the Advisory Boards at the Center for Public Leadership, John F. Kennedy School of Government, Harvard University, and to the U.S. Comptroller General. He is a member of the Council on Foreign Relations, the Atlantic Council of the United States, and the Association of the United States Army.

== United States Secretary of Veterans Affairs (2009–2014) ==
On 7 December 2008, then-President-elect Barack Obama announced at a press conference in Chicago that he would nominate Shinseki to become the Secretary of Veterans Affairs. Shinseki was unanimously confirmed by the United States Senate on 20 January 2009, and sworn in the next day.

=== Veterans Health Administration scandal ===
In May 2014, Shinseki was embroiled in a scandal involving the Veterans Health Administration, which is a component of the United States Department of Veterans Affairs. Questions involving substandard timely care and false records covering up related timelines had come to light, involving treatment of veterans in a number of veterans hospitals. On 30 May 2014, Obama announced that he had accepted Shinseki's resignation as Secretary. Shinseki said he could not explain the lack of integrity among some leaders in veterans healthcare facilities: "That breach of integrity is irresponsible, it is indefensible, and unacceptable to me". He said he could not defend what happened because it was indefensible, but he could take responsibility for it and he would. Shinseki's resignation meant that 2014 was the first time since 2000 that there had not been an Asian American in the Cabinet of the United States.

In an interview with retired General Peter W. Chiarelli, journalist Robert Siegel described the situation as "a case of a very, very good man who's run up against some pretty terrible problems in his job", to which Chiarelli responded, "I don't look up to any man more than I look up to Eric Shinseki".

== Family ==
In 1966, Shinseki married Patricia "Patty" Yoshinobu, his high school sweetheart whom he first met in seventh grade. She was homecoming queen at Waimea High School. They have two children, Lori and Ken, and seven grandchildren.

== Awards, decorations, and badges ==
Shinseki was awarded the following medals, ribbons, badges, and tabs:

Defense Distinguished Service Medal (with one oak leaf cluster)
Army Distinguished Service Medal (with one oak leaf cluster)
Navy Distinguished Service Medal
Air Force Distinguished Service Medal
Coast Guard Distinguished Service Medal
Legion of Merit (with Oak Leaf Cluster)
Bronze Star (with "V" Device and two Oak Leaf Clusters)
Purple Heart (with Oak Leaf Cluster)
Defense Meritorious Service Medal
Meritorious Service Medal (with two Oak Leaf Clusters)
Air Medal
Army Commendation Medal (with Oak Leaf Cluster)
Army Achievement Medal
National Defense Service Medal with Service star
Vietnam Service Medal with four Service stars
Armed Forces Service Medal
Army Service Ribbon
Army Overseas Service Ribbon
NATO Medal for Former Yugoslavia
Vietnam Campaign Medal
Order of Military Merit (Grand Officer; Brazil)

Parachutist Badge
Ranger Tab
Office of the Secretary of Defense Identification Badge
Joint Chiefs of Staff Identification Badge
Army Staff Identification Badge
Four Overseas Service Bars

== Notes ==
Military offices
Preceded by William Crouch	Commanding General of United States Army Europe; 1997–1998	Succeeded by Montgomery Meigs
Preceded by William Crouch	Vice Chief of Staff of the United States Army; 1998–1999	Succeeded by Jack Keane
Preceded by Dennis Reimer	Chief of Staff of the United States Army; 1999–2003	Succeeded by Jack Keane; Acting
Political offices
Preceded by James Peake	United States Secretary of Veterans Affairs; 2009–2014	Succeeded by Robert A. McDonald
U.S. order of precedence (ceremonial)
Preceded by Arne Duncan as Former U.S. Cabinet Member	Order of precedence of the United States as Former U.S. Cabinet Member	Succeeded by Janet Napolitano as Former U.S. Cabinet Member
