= Anthony Principi =

4th United States Secretary of Veterans Affairs

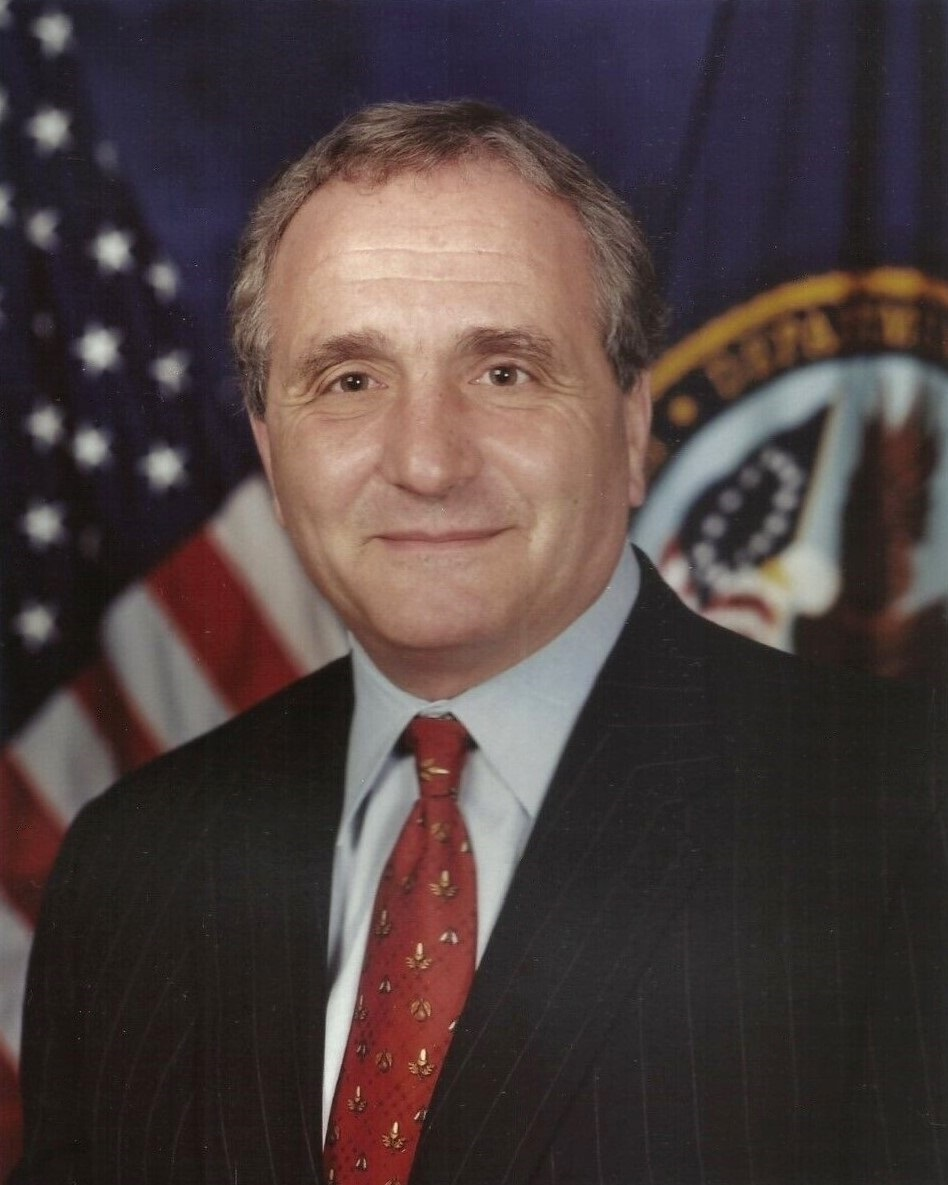
- Official portrait, 2001

4th United States Secretary of Veterans Affairs
- In office January 23, 2001 – January 26, 2005
- President: George W. Bush
- Preceded by: Togo West
- Succeeded by: Jim Nicholson
- In office September 26, 1992 – January 20, 1993; Acting
- President: George H. W. Bush
- Preceded by: Ed Derwinski
- Succeeded by: Jesse Brown

1st United States Deputy Secretary of Veterans Affairs
- In office March 17, 1989 – September 26, 1992
- President: George H. W. Bush
- Preceded by: Position established
- Succeeded by: Hershel Gober

Personal details
- Born: Anthony Joseph Principi; April 16, 1944 (age 82) New York City, New York, U.S.
- Party: Republican
- Education: United States Naval Academy (BS); Seton Hall University (JD)

Military service
- Allegiance: United States
- Branch/service: United States Navy
- Years of service: 1967–1980
- Rank: Lieutenant Commander
- Battles/wars: Vietnam War

Anthony Joseph Principi (born April 16, 1944) is an American attorney and former naval officer who served as the fourth secretary of veterans affairs in the administration of President George W. Bush from 2001 to 2005. He chaired the 2005 Defense Base Closure and Realignment Commission, BRAC and is currently a consultant and board member of several diverse foundations and corporations.

== Early life ==
Principi was born in the East Bronx on April 16, 1944. He grew up in Teaneck, New Jersey and attended St. Anastasia School there during his younger years. He graduated from Mount Saint Michael Academy in 1962 as the school's top athlete and student council president. In 1967, Principi graduated from the United States Naval Academy at Annapolis, Maryland. He first saw active duty aboard the destroyer USS Joseph P. Kennedy. Principi later served in the Vietnam War, commanding a River Patrol Unit in the Mekong Delta.

Principi earned his Juris Doctor degree from Seton Hall in 1975, transferred from the Unrestricted Line as a Surface Warfare Officer to the Judge Advocate General Corps (JAGC) and was assigned to the United States Navy's JAGC office in San Diego. In 1980, he was transferred to Washington as a legislative counsel for the Department of the Navy. He left active duty in 1980 after 14 years of commissioned service to serve as Republican counsel to the Senate Armed Services Committee at the invitation of Senator John Tower of Texas.

== Career ==
=== Veterans affairs ===
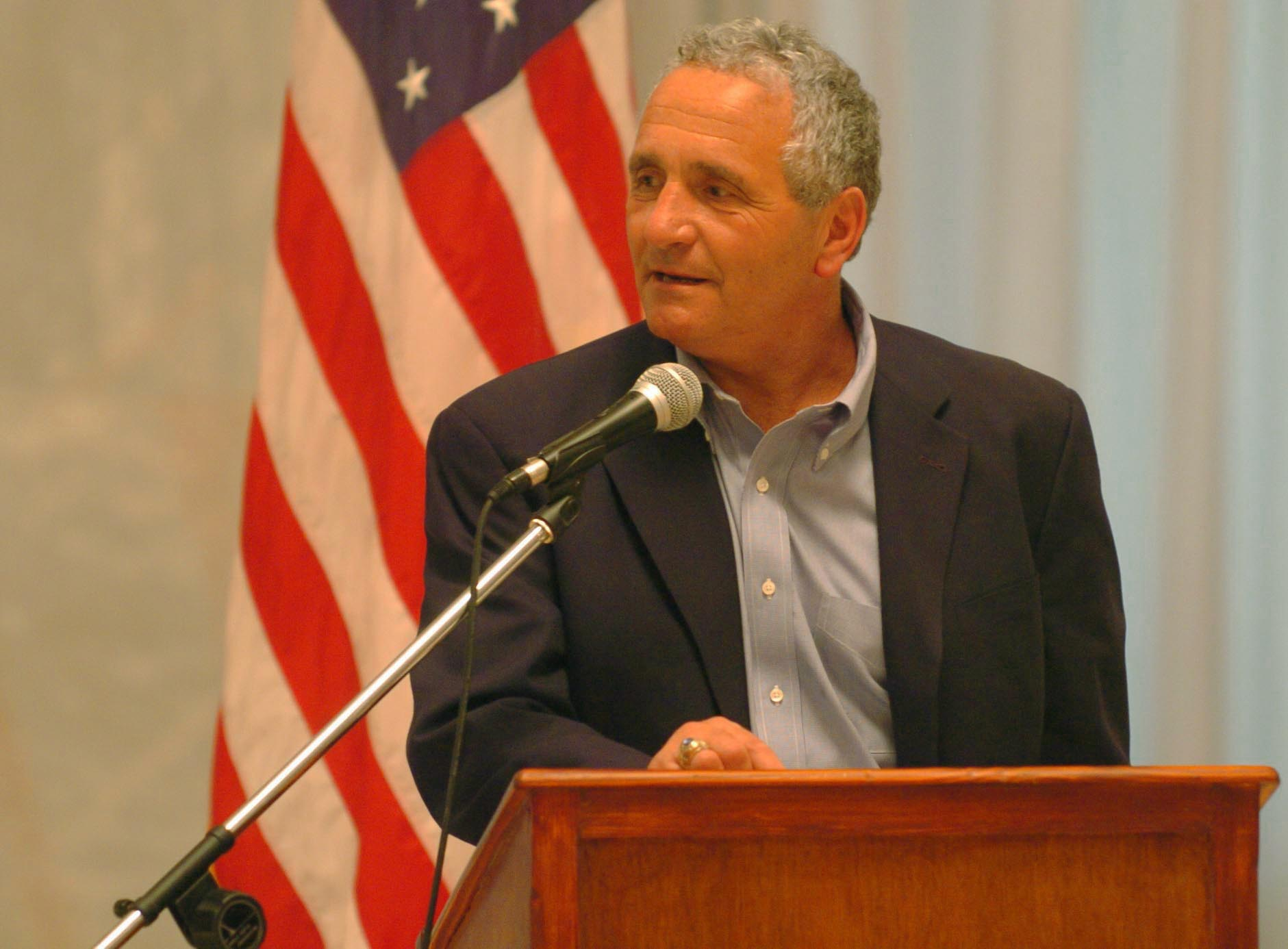
Principi speaking to soldiers in Iraq

From 1984 to 1988, Principi served as Republican chief counsel and staff director of the Senate Committee on Veterans' Affairs. He was the Veterans Administration's assistant deputy administrator for congressional and public affairs from 1983 to 1984, following three years as counsel to the chairman of the Senate Armed Services Committee.

He chaired the Federal Quality Institute in 1991 and was chairman of the Commission on Servicemembers and Veterans Transition Assistance established by Congress in 1996.

Principi served as Deputy Secretary of Veterans Affairs, from March 17, 1989, to September 26, 1992, when he was named Acting Secretary of Veterans Affairs by President George H. W. Bush. He served in that position until January 1993.

=== Armed services ===
Following his VA appointment, Principi served as Republican chief counsel and staff director of the United States Senate Committee on Armed Services.

On March 15, 2005, President George W. Bush appointed nine members to serve on the 2005 BRAC Commission, with Principi serving as the chairman. In October 2015, Principi was elected to the board of directors of Imprimis Pharmaceuticals.

Political offices
New office	United States Deputy Secretary of Veterans Affairs; 1989–1992	Succeeded by Hershel Gober
Preceded by Ed Derwinski	United States Secretary of Veterans Affairs; Acting; 1992–1993	Succeeded by Jesse Brown
Preceded by Togo West	United States Secretary of Veterans Affairs; 2001–2005	Succeeded by Jim Nicholson
U.S. order of precedence (ceremonial)
Preceded by Spencer Abraham as Former U.S. Cabinet Member	Order of precedence of the United States as Former U.S. Cabinet Member	Succeeded by Mel Martínez as Former U.S. Cabinet Member
