= Edward Angus Powell Jr. =

American politician (born 1948)

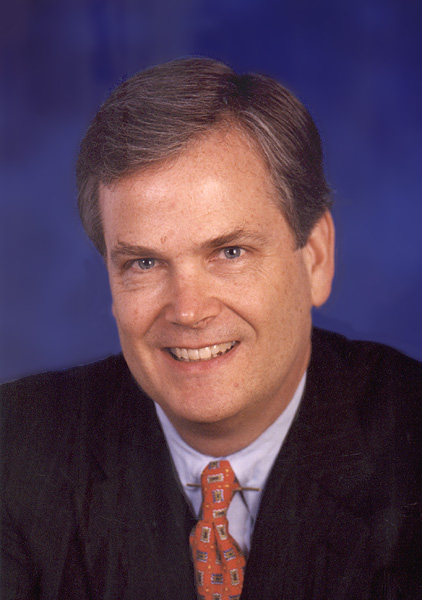
- Edward A. Powell Jr. (2000)

United States Deputy Secretary of Veterans Affairs
- Acting
- In office August 10, 2000 – January 20, 2001
- President: Bill Clinton
- Preceded by: Hershel W. Gober
- Succeeded by: Leo Mackay Jr.

Edward Angus "Ned" Powell Jr. (born April 1, 1948) is a former president of the United Service Organizations (USO), a volunteer organization that provides morale and recreational services to members of the United States military worldwide. A native of Richmond, Virginia, he was nominated by President Bill Clinton and confirmed to serve as the Assistant Secretary for Financial Management, and was then promoted to Acting Deputy Secretary for the Department of Veterans Affairs, or VA. While at the VA, Powell was charged with managing 220,000 employees with an annual budget of $48 billion. Under his leadership, the VA received its first-ever clean audit opinion. As a result, he received the VA's Exceptional Service Award and was named Distinguished Federal Executive (for 2000) by the Association of Government Accountants.

Powell's career began as a Navy Yeoman serving with the Defense Intelligence Agency. His broad executive experience includes the ownership and management of several successful business ventures, and he is a former adjunct professor of Business Ethics and Policy at the University of Richmond School of Business. He passed the Series 7, Securities Broker's Exam, and held a Virginia real estate broker's license. He was active in the Young President's Organization, the World President's Organization, and currently participates in L3 (an offshoot organization of WPO).

After serving at VA, Powell became the CEO of World Headquarters of the USO and served in this role between 2002 and 2009. As a result of his service, Powell was awarded The Department of Defense Medal for Distinguished Public Service; The Distinguished Public Service Award, Chairman of Joint Chief of Staff; The Office of the Secretary of Defense Medal for Exceptional Public Service; Decoration for Distinguished Civilian Service, Department of the Army; Secretary of the Army Public Service Award; Distinguished Public Service Award, Secretary of the Navy Gordon England; and the Distinguished Public Service Award, Secretary of the Navy Don Winter.

In 2020 Powell was awarded the Distinguished Alumni Award by Washington & Lee University.

Powell received his BA in Economics from Washington and Lee University, and later went on to obtain his MBA from the University of North Carolina at Chapel Hill in 1978, using his GI Bill benefits.

Government offices
Preceded by Hershel W. Gober	United States Deputy Secretary of Veterans Affairs acting 2000-2001	Succeeded by Leo Mackay Jr.
