= Leo Mackay Jr. =

American government official (born 1961)

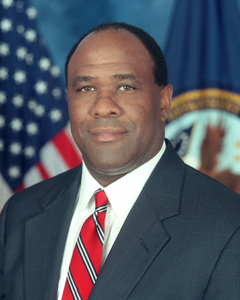
- Mackay in 2002

4th United States Deputy Secretary of Veterans Affairs
- In office May 24, 2001 – September 30, 2003
- President: George W. Bush
- Preceded by: Edward A. Powell (Acting)
- Succeeded by: Gordon H. Mansfield

Personal details
- Born: Leo Sidney Mackay Jr. August 15, 1961 (age 65) San Antonio, Texas, U.S.
- Party: Republican
- Education: United States Naval Academy (BS); Harvard University (MPP, PhD)

Military service
- Allegiance: United States
- Branch/service: United States Navy
- Years of service: 1983–1995
- Rank: Lieutenant Commander
- Unit: VF-11
- Battles/wars: Operation Earnest Will

Leo Sidney Mackay Jr. (born August 15, 1961) is an American businessman, and a former deputy secretary of the United States Department of Veterans Affairs.

He is senior vice president, and an elected officer, of Lockheed Martin Corporation. Currently, he is senior vice president - ethics and enterprise assurance, serving as the corporate audit executive (CAE); as well as leading the offices of Ethics and Business Conduct; Environment, Safety, and Health; enterprise risk; and serving as chief sustainability officer. The Lockheed Martin sustainability program has been perennially ranked among the world's best.

He is a director, and investment committee member, of Lockheed Martin Ventures, the wholly owned venture capital arm of Lockheed Martin. He reports to the CEO, the Audit Committee, and the Nominations and Corporate Governance Committee of the board of directors. He is an independent director of publicly traded companies Ameren and Cognizant Technology Solutions. His work on Cognizant's audit committee has been highly praised. He is also a former director (from 2016-2022) of the Federal Savings Bank of USAA and a former strategic advisor of Pegasus Capital Advisors. He was U.S. Black Engineer magazine's 2012 Black Engineer of the Year Awardee for Career Achievement, and the 2014 Lincoln-Douglass Award winner from the Republican National Committee. He is a member, with term ending in September, 2023, of the Board of Regents of Concordia Theological Seminary.

Previously, Mackay chaired the Board of Visitors at the Graduate School of Public Affairs of the University of Maryland (2008–2014). He was a board member, and chair of the Audit Committee, of the Center for a New American Security in Wahshington, DC (2007–2015), and continues on its Board of Advisors. He was chair of the Lutheran Housing Support Corporation (2006–2011); Chair of the Secretary of Health and Human Services' Advisory Committee on Minority Health (2004–2005); and a board member of Cook's Children's Hospital in Fort Worth, Texas (1998–2001).

== Government service ==
Mackay was Deputy Secretary of Veterans Affairs from May 2001 to October 2003. As the department's second in command and designated chief operating officer, he had operational authority over the department's three major agencies: the Veterans Health Administration (VHA), the nation's largest integrated healthcare system; the Veterans Benefits Administration (VBA); and the National Cemetery Administration. He concentrated on departmental management initiating a Strategic Management Council, reformulating the departmental budget process, and changing the internal merit system for GS/SES personnel. He was concentrated on the CARES project, a capital asset realignment of VHA; enhanced use leasing; lowering the backlog of pending veterans' claims; achievement and maintenance of a clean audit; the National Shrine Commitment, an effort to raise, and make standard, the condition of the national cemeteries; and VetFran, a program for transitioning veterans to aid them in starting franchise businesses. He was also, with David Chu, a founding co-chair of the VA-DoD Joint Executive Council to increase interdepartmental collaboration and sharing. Upon his departure, then-Secretary Anthony Principi stated, "Dr. Mackay brought to VA the discipline of the business world and the compassion of a man who cares deeply for America's veterans. His legacy is a more-focused VA better able to meet the needs of veterans."

From 1993 to 1995, Mackay served as military assistant to then-Assistant Secretary of Defense for International Security Policy, Ashton Carter. During this time, the office was re-organized to focus on cooperative de-nuclearization, execution of the Nunn-Lugar threat reduction program, nuclear weapons policy, and counter-proliferation. The office also was the Office of the Secretary of Defense (OSD) lead for the Nuclear Posture Review of 1994-95.

== 2016 Presidential Transition ==
On January 3, 2017, Mackay met with president-elect Donald Trump at Trump Tower in New York City to discuss the cabinet post of Secretary of Veterans Affairs. Though Mackay described their meeting as a "good discussion" he was not selected for the post. Other reporting, citing sources internal to the campaign, said he was "reluctant to leave the private sector."

== Personal history ==
Mackay resides in Northern Virginia. He was born into a military family in San Antonio, Texas, and grew up on, and around, military installations. He lived in Japan as a child and spent a year and a half of high school in Tehran, Iran. His family was evacuated in December 1978 as the Shah's government disintegrated. He served in the Navy as a naval aviator. He completed pilot training in 1985, graduating at the top of his class. He spent three years in Fighter Squadron Eleven flying the F-14, attended Fighter Weapons School (Topgun), and compiled 235 carrier landings and 1,000 hours in the F-14. He is a veteran of Operation Earnest Will earning the Armed Forces Expeditionary Medal. He taught western civilization and modern military history during his service as an instructor at the Naval Academy.

== Affiliations ==
Mackay is a former member of the Aspen Strategy Group, and the Council on Foreign Relations, and a life member of the U.S. Naval Institute. He was a Research Fellow at the Belfer Center for Science and International Affairs, and was a Special Guest Fellow at the Brookings Institution. He is a past independent director of the Henry L. Stimson Center in Washington, DC.

== Education ==
Mackay was a 1983 graduate of the U.S. Naval Academy, and a recipient of the Secretary of the Navy Distinguished Midshipman Graduate Award. He holds a master's degree in public policy, and Ph.D. in public policy from Harvard University. He was a Kennedy Fellow, Harvard MacArthur Scholar, and Graduate Prize Fellow at Harvard. In 2005, Mackay was awarded a Doctor of Laws, honoris causa from Concordia Seminary, and served as the commencement speaker for its graduation that year. In 2023, he was awarded a Doctor of Humane Letters, honoris causa from Concordia Theological Seminary. He is the first layman to be awarded an honorary doctorate from each of the two seminaries of the Lutheran Church–Missouri Synod.

Political offices
Preceded by Edward A. Powell; Acting	United States Deputy Secretary of Veterans Affairs; 2001–2003	Succeeded by Gordon H. Mansfield
