= United States Deputy Secretary of Veterans Affairs =

Coordinates: 38°54′2.8″N 77°02′4.0″W

Deputy Secretary of Veterans Affairs of the United States
- Seal of the Department of Veterans Affairs

- Flag of the deputy secretary

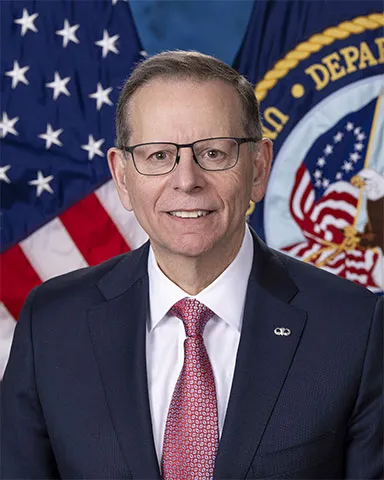
- Incumbent; Paul Lawrence since March 29, 2025
- United States Department of Veterans Affairs
- Style: Mr. Deputy Secretary
- Reports to: Secretary of Veterans Affairs
- Seat: Washington, D.C.
- Appointer: The president with Senate advice and consent
- Term length: No fixed term
- Formation: March 17, 1989
- First holder: Anthony Joseph Principi
- Salary: Executive Schedule, level II
- Website: www.va.gov

The deputy secretary of veterans affairs, in the United States government, is the chief operating officer of the United States Department of Veterans Affairs, responsible for a nationwide system of health care services, benefits programs, and national cemeteries for America's veterans and their dependents. The deputy secretary is the second-highest-ranking officer in the department and succeeds the secretary in the event of his resignation, death, or otherwise inability to fulfill his duties.

The deputy secretary is appointed by the president and confirmed by the Senate. The position was created with the creation of the Department of Veterans Affairs in October 1988.

== List of deputy secretaries of veterans affairs ==
No.	Portrait	Name	Term of office		President(s) served under
No.	Portrait	Name	Start	End	President(s) served under
1		Anthony Joseph Principi ^{#}	March 17, 1989	September 26, 1992	George H. W. Bush
2		Hershel Wayne Gober ^{#}	February 4, 1993	August 10, 2000	Bill Clinton
–		Edward A. "Ned" Powell, Jr. (acting)	August 10, 2000	January 20, 2001	Bill Clinton
3		Leo S. Mackay, Jr.	May 24, 2001	September 30, 2003	George W. Bush
4		Gordon H. Mansfield ^{#}	January 22, 2004	January 20, 2009	George W. Bush
5		W. Scott Gould	April 9, 2009	May 17, 2013	Barack Obama
6		Sloan D. Gibson ^{#}	February 11, 2014	January 20, 2017	Barack Obama
–		Gina Farrisee (acting)	January 20, 2017	February 25, 2017	Donald Trump
–		Scott Blackburn (acting)	February 26, 2017	August 9, 2017	Donald Trump
7		Thomas G. Bowman	August 10, 2017	June 15, 2018	Donald Trump
8		James Byrne	August 28, 2018	September 16, 2019	Donald Trump
8		James Byrne	September 16, 2019	February 3, 2020	Donald Trump
–		Pamela J. Powers (acting)	April 2, 2020	January 20, 2021	Donald Trump
–		Carolyn Clancy (acting)	January 20, 2021	July 19, 2021	Joe Biden
9		Donald Remy	July 19, 2021	April 1, 2023	Joe Biden
–		Guy Kiyokawa (acting)	April 1, 2023	September 19, 2023	Joe Biden
10		Tanya J. Bradsher	September 20, 2023	January 20, 2025	Joe Biden
11		Paul Lawrence	March 29, 2025	Incumbent	Donald Trump
