= Sloan D. Gibson =

American politician

Sloan Gibson
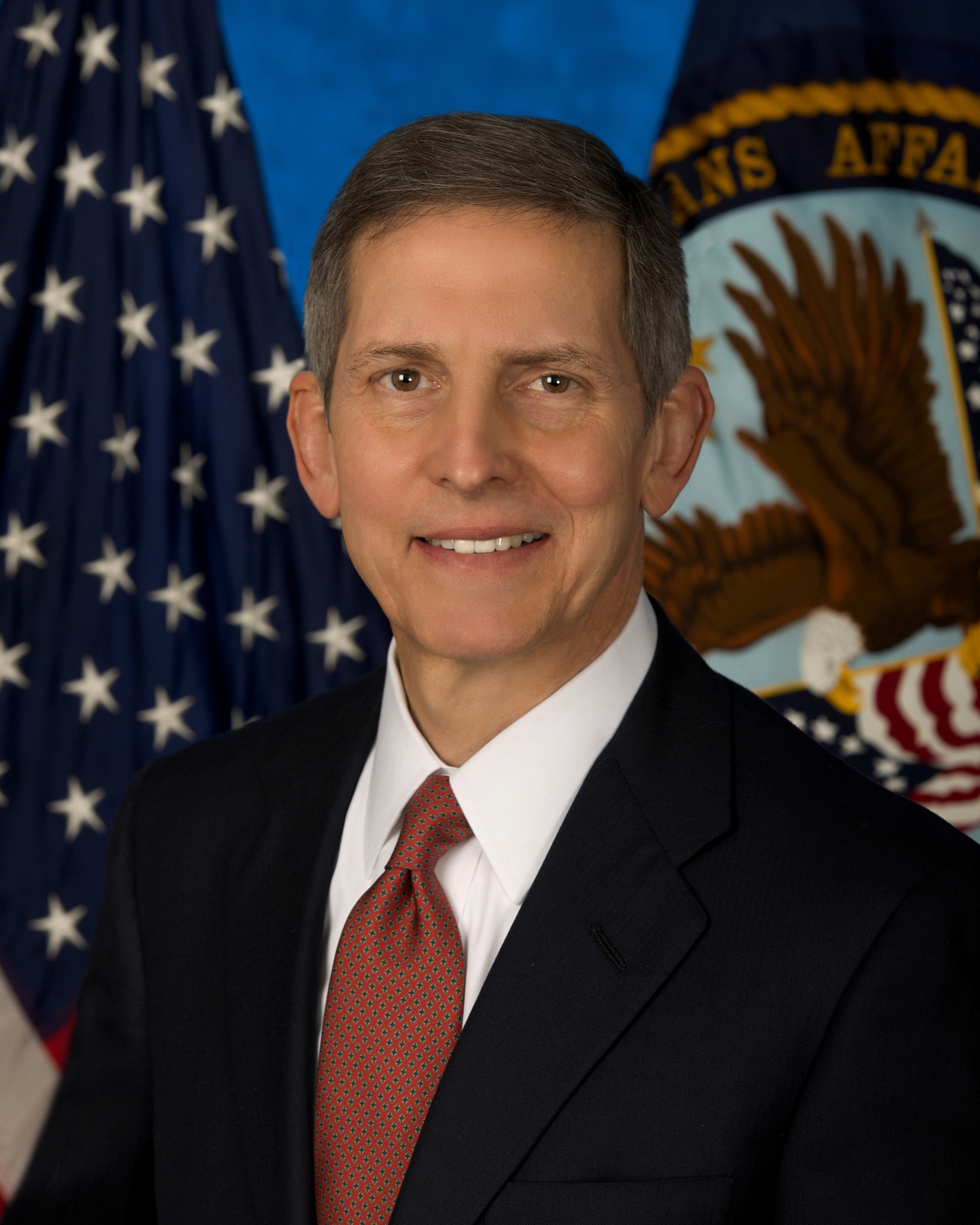
- Gibson in 2014

6th United States Deputy Secretary of Veterans Affairs
- In office February 11, 2014 – January 20, 2017
- President: Barack Obama
- Preceded by: Scott Gould
- Succeeded by: Thomas G. Bowman

United States Secretary of Veterans Affairs
- Acting; May 30, 2014 – July 30, 2014
- President: Barack Obama
- Preceded by: Eric Shinseki
- Succeeded by: Bob McDonald

Personal details
- Born: Sloan Duncan Gibson IV; 1952 or 1953 (age 73–74) Washington, D.C., U.S.
- Party: Republican
- Spouse: Margaret
- Children: 2
- Education: United States Military Academy (BS); University of Missouri, Kansas City (MA); Harvard University (MPA)

Military service
- Allegiance: United States
- Branch/service: United States Army

Sloan Duncan Gibson IV (born 1952/1953) is the former United States Deputy Secretary of Veterans Affairs. Gibson was confirmed as the Deputy Secretary of Veterans Affairs by the United States Senate on February 11, 2014, replacing former Deputy Secretary W. Scott Gould who resigned on May 17, 2013. He became the acting Secretary of Veterans Affairs after Secretary Eric Shinseki resigned on May 30, 2014. Gibson held the acting secretary and deputy secretary positions concurrently until Robert McDonald was sworn in as the Secretary of Veterans Affairs on July 30, 2014.

== Education ==
Gibson attended Hargrave Military Academy during high school, graduating in the Class of 1971. He then attended the United States Military Academy at West Point, where he graduated with the Class of 1975. Gibson also earned a master's degree in Economics from the University of Missouri–Kansas City and a Masters in Public Administration from the John F. Kennedy School of Government at Harvard University.

== Career ==
Before his appointment as deputy secretary, Gibson was the 22nd president and CEO of the USO. He assumed that role on September 1, 2008. In 2004, he retired as chairman and chief financial officer of AmSouth Bancorporation. During his tenure, AmSouth became part of the S&P 500. In 2002, Gibson chaired the United Way campaign in Central Alabama. Gibson was selected to serve as interim President at Hargrave Military Academy in 2021, the first Hargrave graduate ever to hold that office.

== Military service ==
Gibson earned both Airborne and Ranger qualifications and served as an infantry officer in the United States Army.

== Personal life ==
Gibson and his wife, Margaret Gibson, whom he has been married to for over 32 years, have two grown daughters, Celia Gibson and Laura Gibson.

Political offices
Preceded by Scott Gould	United States Deputy Secretary of Veterans Affairs; 2014–2017	Succeeded by Thomas G. Bowman
Preceded by Eric Shinseki	United States Secretary of Veterans Affairs; Acting; 2014	Succeeded by Bob McDonald
