= Todd B. Hunter =

American government official

Todd Hunter
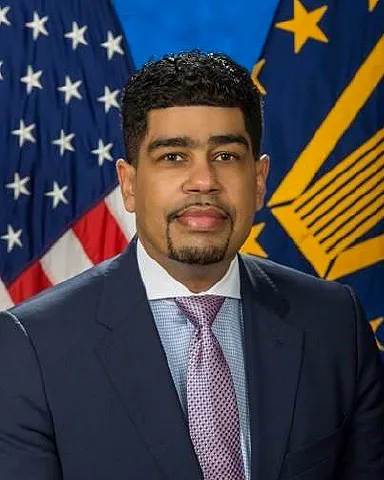
- Official portrait, 2025

Acting United States Secretary of Veterans Affairs
- In office January 20, 2025 – February 5, 2025
- President: Donald Trump
- Preceded by: Denis McDonough
- Succeeded by: Doug Collins

Military service
- Allegiance: United States
- Branch/service: United States Army

Todd B. Hunter is an American government official serving as Deputy Executive Director of the Office of Mission Support in the U.S. Department of Veterans Affairs. He served as Acting U.S. Secretary of Veterans Affairs from January 20 to February 5, 2025, when Doug Collins was sworn into office.

== Career ==
Hunter served in the United States Army for 22 years.

Within the U.S. Department of Veterans Affairs, Hunter was Executive Director of the Office of Acquisition, Logistics, and Construction, and served as Acting Associate Executive Director for the Strategic Acquisition Center. During the first Trump administration, he was Deputy Executive Director of the Office of Accountability and Whistleblower Protection. He later became Deputy Executive Director of the Office of Mission Support.

Hunter was appointed Acting Secretary of Veterans Affairs by President Donald Trump on January 20, 2025.

Political offices
Preceded by Denis McDonough	United States Secretary of Veterans Affairs; Acting; 2025	Succeeded by Doug Collins
