= E. Grey Lewis =

American lawyer

8th General Counsel of the Navy
- In office August 1, 1973 – April 21, 1977
- President: Richard M. Nixon; Gerald Ford; Jimmy Carter

Personal details
- Born: 1940 Atlantic City, New Jersey, U.S.
- Died: 2005 (aged 64–65) Alexandria, Virginia, U.S.
- Party: Republican

E. Grey Lewis (1940–2005) was an American lawyer who served as General Counsel of the Navy from 1973 to 1977.

== Biography ==
Lewis was born in 1940 in Atlantic City, New Jersey and educated at the Peddie School where he was student body president. He attended Princeton University, receiving a B.A. in Politics in 1959. While there, he was on the swim team, the rowing team, and was a member of the American Whig–Cliosophic Society. He also participated in the Reserve Officers' Training Corps while in university and upon graduation, joined the United States Army. After completing his army service, he enrolled at the University of Pennsylvania Law School and graduated in 1963.

== Assistant United States Attorney ==
After leaving law school, Lewis became an Assistant United States Attorney for the District of Columbia. He later became an Assistant U.S. Attorney in the United States Department of Justice Civil Division.

== General Counsel of the Navy ==
In 1973, President of the United States Richard Nixon nominated Lewis as General Counsel of the Navy and, after Senate confirmation, he held this office from August 1, 1973, until April 21, 1977. For his service to the United States Department of the Navy, Lewis was awarded the Navy Distinguished Public Service Award.

Upon leaving the Department of the Navy, Lewis founded a Washington, D.C. law firm, Lewis, Kominers & James. He later became a partner at McDermott Will & Emery.

== Death ==
Lewis died in 2005 in Alexandria, Virginia.

Government offices
Preceded by Hart T. Mankin	General Counsel of the Navy; August 1, 1973 – April 21, 1977	Succeeded by Togo D. West Jr.
