= Andrew DeVries =

American sculptor

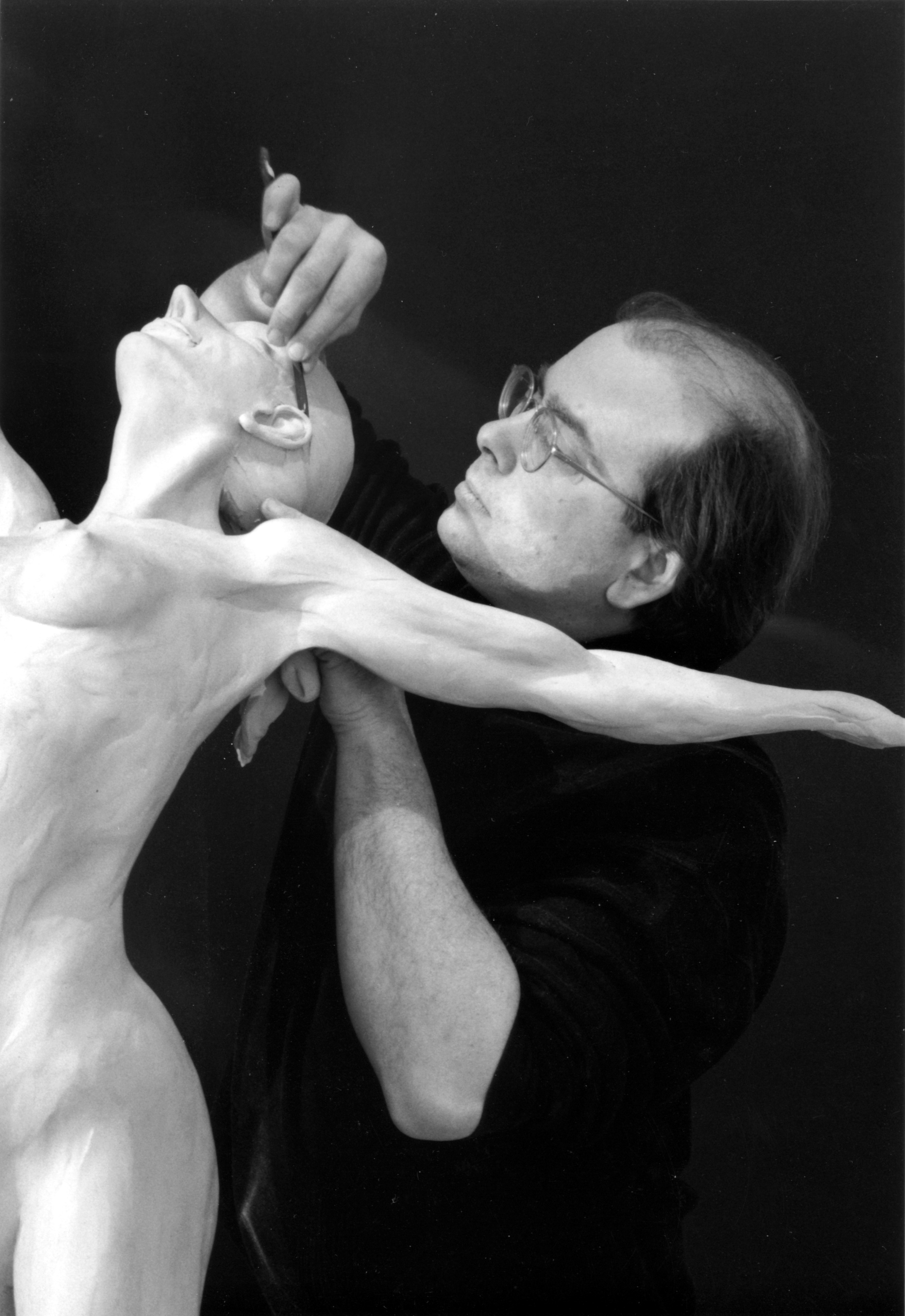
- Andrew DeVries working on the clay for his sculpture "Sparrow"
- Born: 1957 (age 68–69); Rochester, New York, USA

Andrew W. DeVries (born 1957 in Rochester, New York) is an American artist and sculptor living and working in the Berkshires of western Massachusetts. His works, primarily in lost wax cast bronze produced at his own foundry, explore the human body portrayed through dance, though he has a substantial body of work centered in the purely symbolic form as well.

== Early life and work ==
His early years were spent on his parents' dairy farm in Rochester, NY where he first learned to work with his hands. Frustrated by the limitations of art classes in high school, he dropped out at the age of fifteen, but remained on his parents' farm for 5 years, painting in his spare time. From 1978 to 1980 he drew dancers in Ballet Denver, the studios of Rieke Maria Love in Denver, CO, and it was Love that first suggested he try sculpture. Before leaving Colorado, he apprenticed with sculptor Ed Dwight, learned the art of the foundry from Lee Schenkeir and studied mold making with Raelee Frazier. In 1984 he toured Europe, sketching in museums and city squares before settling into Paris for a six-month study at the Paris-American Academy. Returning to the United States, in 1985 he settled in the town of Middlefield, MA and built a sculpting studio and foundry with the help of his father. Taking casting work from other sculptors at his foundry led to a close connection with Elliot Offner, then Professor of Art at Smith College in Northampton, MA and a past President of the National Sculpture Society.

== Awards ==
- 1989 National Sculpture Society's Young Sculptor Award
- 1991 awarded the Walter and Michael Lantz prize from the National Sculpture Society (NSS)
- 1994 his work The Chariot was selected for the NSS International Exhibition in Seravezza, Italy
- 1996 Awarded the Lindsay Morris Memorial Prize by the NSS
- 2003 DeVries invited to exhibit by the Florence Biennale in Italy

== Works ==
DeVries has accepted a number of commissions over the years, producing bronzes of Irish actor and director Vincent Dowling(2005), Congressman Silvio O. Conte(1986) and former Deputy Secretary of Veterans Affairs Gordon H. Mansfield (2010). In 2009, the veterans group SoldierOn commissioned him to create the award they present each year, given that first year to Admiral Mike Mullen and in 2010 to Congressman John Olver. DeVries exhibits and has done bronze casting demonstrations at museums such as Chesterwood Museum (where he was artist in residence for 12 years), Norman Rockwell Museum, Springfield Museums, Ventfort Hall Museum of the Golden Age, the Berkshire Museum and the Clark Art Institute, and was featured in the WGBY-TV program called Making It Here. He has done large solo exhibitions in Northampton, MA and Old Lyme, CT as well as a town wide installation of 25 large works in Lenox, MA where his gallery DeVries Fine Art International, Inc. is located. From March through November 2013, an exhibition of more than 40 of his bronzes and 20 of his pastel drawings were featured at The National Museum of Dance in Saratoga Springs, NY. DeVries' sculpture is in private and corporate collections around the world, and in the U.S. Library of Congress.
