= James Peake =

Surgeon General of the US Army

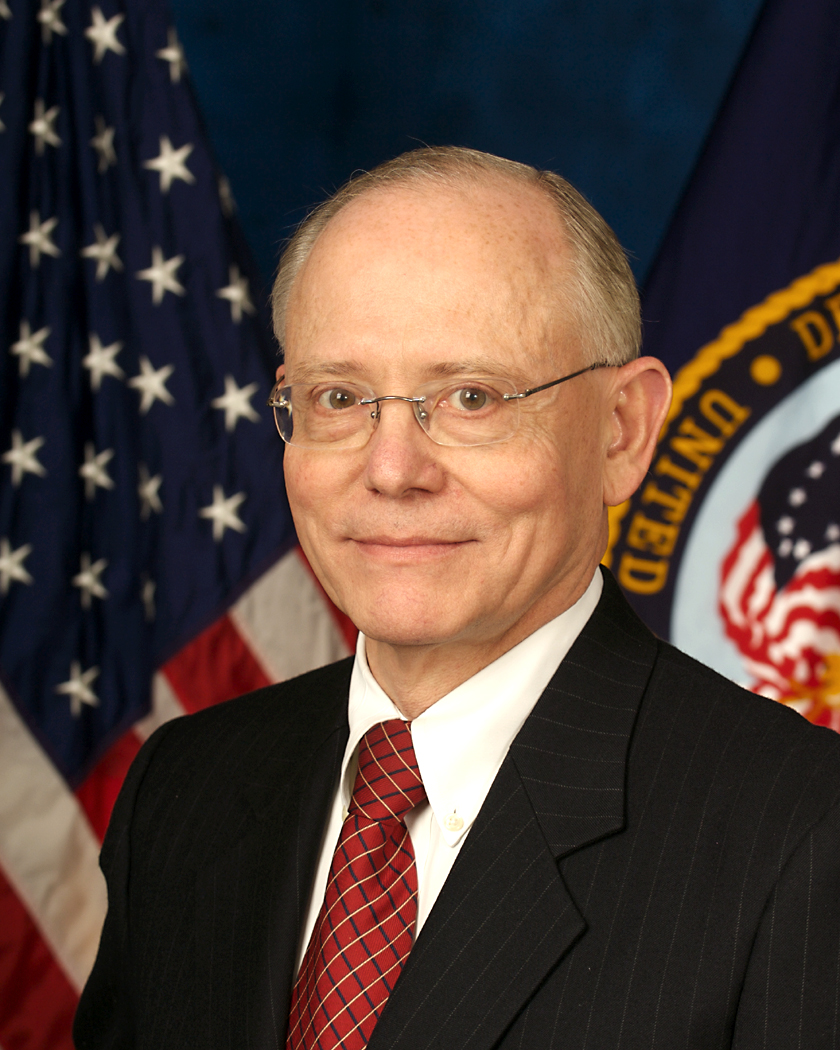
- Peake in 2007

6th United States Secretary of Veterans Affairs
- In office December 20, 2007 – January 20, 2009
- President: George W. Bush
- Deputy: Gordon H. Mansfield
- Preceded by: Jim Nicholson
- Succeeded by: Eric Shinseki

40th Surgeon General of the United States Army
- In office September 22, 2000 – July 8, 2004
- President: Bill Clinton; George W. Bush
- Preceded by: Ronald R. Blanck
- Succeeded by: Kevin C. Kiley

Personal details
- Born: James Benjamin Peake; June 18, 1944 (age 81) St. Louis, Missouri, U.S.
- Party: Republican
- Education: United States Military Academy (BS); Cornell University (MD)

Military service
- Allegiance: United States
- Branch/service: United States Army
- Years of service: 1966–2004
- Rank: Lieutenant General
- Unit: Medical Corps
- Battles/wars: Vietnam War
- Awards: Army Distinguished Service Medal; Silver Star; Defense Superior Service Medal; Legion of Merit; Bronze Star; Purple Heart; Meritorious Service Medal; Air Medal; Joint Services Commendation Medal; Army Commendation Medal; Humanitarian Service Medal; Armed Forces Expeditionary Medal; Combat Infantryman Badge; Navy Meritorious Unit Award; Joint Meritorious Unit Award; Senior Parachutist Badge; Pathfinder Badge; Combat Medical Badge; Army Staff Identification Badge

James Benjamin Peake (born June 18, 1944) is an American politician and former lieutenant general who served as the sixth secretary of veterans affairs from 2007 to 2009. In 2004, he retired from a 38-year United States Army career; having served as the 40th Surgeon General of the United States Army.

== Biography ==
=== Early life ===
Peake was born in St. Louis, Missouri to a military family. His father began as an enlisted man in the Army, and became an officer who spent most of his 30-year career in the Medical Corps. Peake's mother was an Army nurse, and his brother was a naval aviator.

=== Military career ===
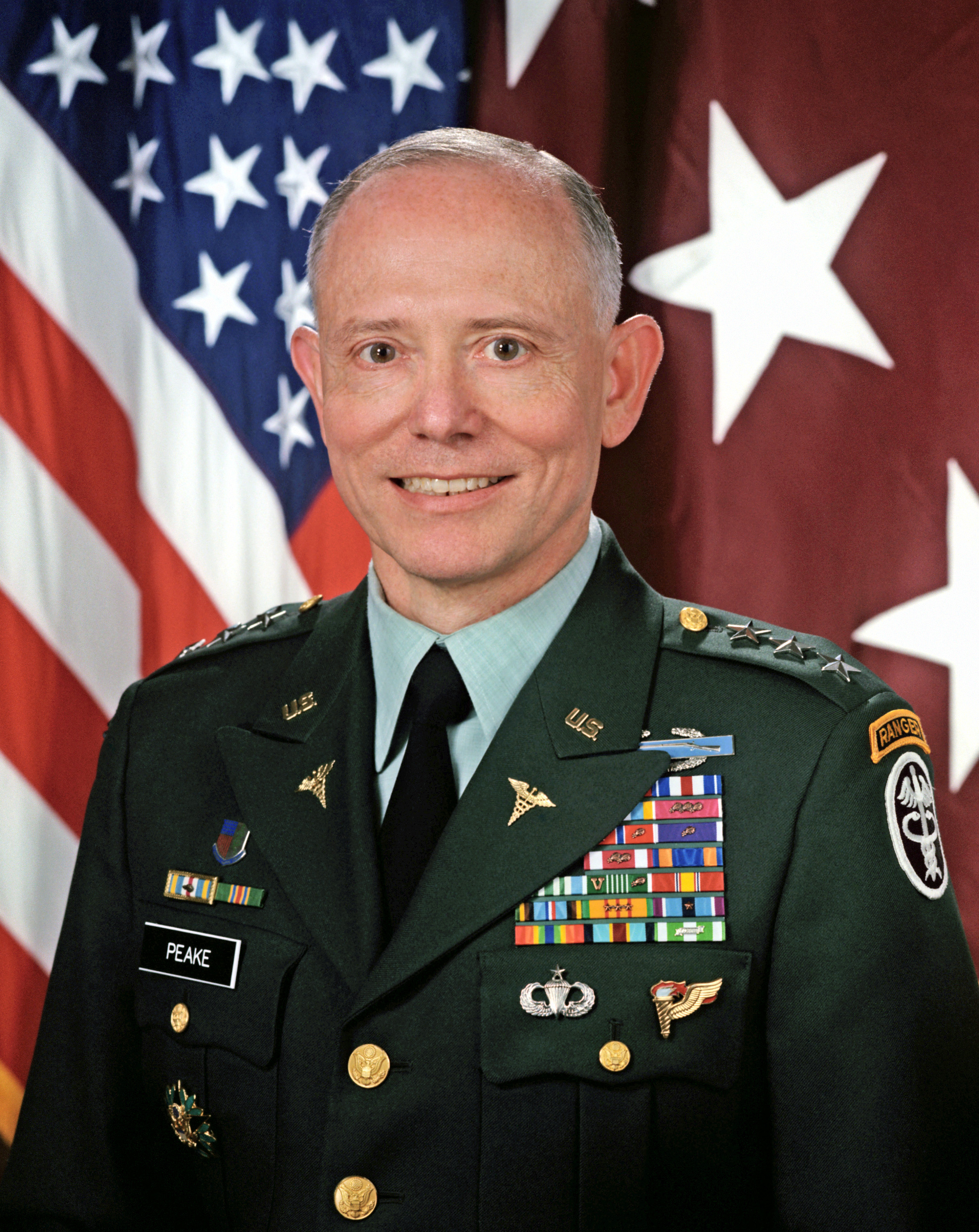
Official portrait of Lieutenant General James Peake

At the age of 18, he set upon his own Army career when he was accepted to West Point. Peake received his Bachelor of Science degree from U.S. Military Academy at West Point in 1966 and was commissioned a second lieutenant in the U.S. Army Infantry.

Following service in Vietnam with the 101st Airborne Division, where he was awarded the Silver Star, a Bronze Star with "V" device and the Purple Heart with oak leaf cluster, Peake entered medical school at Cornell University in New York. He was awarded a medical doctorate in 1972. He retired from the Army in 2004, as a lieutenant general.

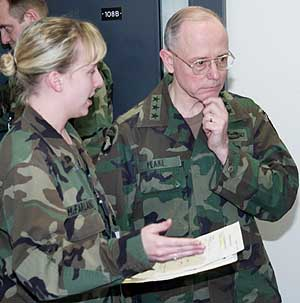
Lt. Gen. James B. Peake during his tour of Fort McCoy.

Peake served for four years as the United States Army Surgeon General. He also served as commander of several Army medical units. Previous key assignments include Commander, U.S. Army Medical Department Center and School and Installation Commander, Fort Sam Houston; Deputy Commander, U.S. Army Medical Command, Fort Sam Houston, Texas; Commanding General, Madigan Army Medical Center/Northwest Health Service Support Activity, Tacoma, Washington; Commanding General, 44th Medical Brigade/Corps Surgeon, XVIII Airborne Corps, Fort Bragg; Deputy Director, Professional Services/Chief, Consultant, Office of the Surgeon General, Falls Church, Virginia; Commander, 18th Medical Command and 121st Evacuation Hospital/Command Surgeon, Seoul, Korea; Deputy Commander for Clinical Services, Tripler Army Medical Center, Honolulu, Hawaii; Assistant Chief, Cardiothoracic Surgery, Brooke Army Medical Center, Fort Sam Houston, Texas; Staff General Surgeon/Chief, General Surgery Clinic, DeWitt Army Hospital, Fort Belvoir; and General Surgery Resident, Brooke Army Medical Center, Fort Sam Houston, Texas.

Awards and decorations that Peake has received include the Distinguished Service Medal (with oak leaf cluster), Silver Star, Defense Superior Service Medal, Legion of Merit (with three oak leaf clusters), Bronze Star with "V" device (with one oak leaf cluster), Purple Heart (with oak leaf cluster), Meritorious Service Medal (with two oak leaf clusters), Air Medal, Joint Services Commendation Medal, Army Commendation Medal with "V" device (with one oak leaf cluster), Humanitarian Service Medal, the Armed Forces Expeditionary Medal, Combat Infantryman Badge, Combat Medical Badge, Navy Meritorious Unit Commendation, Joint Meritorious Unit Award (with one oak leaf cluster), Senior Parachutist Badge, Pathfinder Badge, Ranger Tab and Army Staff Identification Badge.

After Vietnam, he attended Cornell University's Weill Cornell Medical College. He is also a graduate of the United States Army War College, in 1988.

=== Dates of rank ===
Promotions
Rank	Date
Second lieutenant	June 8, 1966
First lieutenant	June 8, 1967
Captain	June 8, 1968
Major	July 10, 1972
Lieutenant colonel	July 10, 1977
Colonel	November 1, 1982
Brigadier general	April 1, 1992
Major general	March 1, 1995
Lieutenant general	September 7, 2000

=== Post-military career ===
After retiring from the Army, Peake served as Executive Vice President and Chief Operating Officer of Project Hope, a non-profit international health foundation operating in more than 30 countries. While at Project HOPE he helped to orchestrate the use of civilian volunteers aboard the Navy Hospital Ship Mercy as it responded to the tsunami disaster in Indonesia and also as part of the Hurricane Katrina response aboard the Hospital Ship Comfort.

Just prior to his nomination as Secretary of Veterans Affairs, Peake served as Chief Medical Officer and Chief Executive Officer for QTC, one of the largest private providers of government-outsourced occupational health and disability examination services in the nation.

On December 17, 2009, CGI Group Inc., one of the largest independent information technology and business process services firms in the world, announced the hiring of Peake as Senior Vice-President for the Health Industry.

==== Secretary of Veterans Affairs ====
Peake's selection as VA secretary was announced on October 30, 2007. He was confirmed by the United States Senate on December 14, 2007 and sworn in at VA headquarters by Vice President Dick Cheney on December 20.

Peake was inducted into the U.S. Army Ranger Hall of Fame in 2009.

== See also ==
Biography- George W. Bush White House Archives

Military offices
Preceded by Ronald Blanck	Surgeon General of the United States Army; 2000–2004	Succeeded by Kevin Kiley
Political offices
Preceded by Jim Nicholson	United States Secretary of Veterans Affairs; 2007–2009	Succeeded by Eric Shinseki
U.S. order of precedence (ceremonial)
Preceded by Michael Mukasey as Former U.S. Cabinet Member	Order of precedence of the United States as Former U.S. Cabinet Member	Succeeded by Ed Schafer as Former U.S. Cabinet Member
