= Bruno Lucchesi =

Italian-American sculptor (1926–2026)

Bruno Lucchesi (July 31, 1926 – July 3, 2026) was an Italian-American sculptor known for his figurative work.

== Life and career ==
Lucchesi was born in Fibbiano Montanino in Lucca, Italy, on July 31, 1926. He studied at the Art Institute of Lucca, then moved to Florence, Italy, where he became Assistant Professor at Florence University in 1953. In 1958 he moved to New York City, and has since taught there at the National Academy of Design and the New School of Social Research. He continued to teach workshops in the United States and Europe.

Beginning in 1961, Lucchesi has had numerous exhibits at Forum Gallery in New York City. His works are in the permanent collections of the Metropolitan Museum of Art, Brooklyn Museum, Whitney Museum, Hirshhorn Museum, the Museum of the City of New York, and many others. He has received a Guggenheim Fellowship, as well as gold medals from the National Sculpture Society and the National Academy. He has also received honorary degrees from Cedar Crest College and the Lyme Academy College of Fine Arts.

Lucchesi died in New York on July 3, 2026, at the age of 99.

== Publications ==
Lucchesi published four books on sculpture:

- Sculptor of the Human Spirit
- Terracotta
- Modeling the Figure in Clay
- Modeling the Head in Clay
