= United States Secretary of Veterans Affairs =

U.S. Cabinet position

- Seal of the Department of Veterans Affairs

- Flag of the secretary

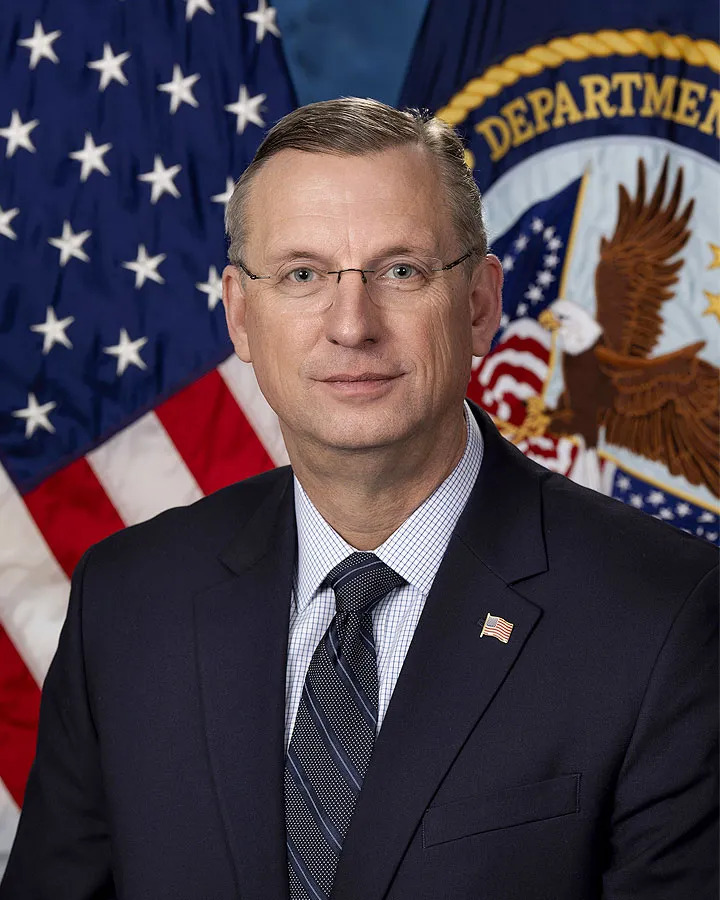
- Incumbent; Doug Collins since February 5, 2025
- United States Department of Veterans Affairs
- Style: Mr. Secretary (informal); The Honorable (formal)
- Member of: United States Cabinet
- Reports to: President of the United States
- Seat: Veteran Affairs Building, Washington, D.C.
- Appointer: The president; with advice and consent of the Senate
- Term length: No fixed term
- Constituting instrument: 38 U.S.C. § 303
- Formation: March 15, 1989
- First holder: Ed Derwinski
- Succession: Seventeenth
- Deputy: Deputy Secretary
- Salary: Executive Schedule, Level I
- Website: VA.gov

The United States secretary of veterans affairs is the head of the United States Department of Veterans Affairs, the department concerned with veterans' benefits, health care, and national veterans' memorials and cemeteries. The secretary is a member of the Cabinet and second to last at seventeenth in the line of succession to the presidency (the position was last until the addition of the United States Department of Homeland Security in 2006). Until the appointment of David Shulkin in 2017, all appointees and acting appointees to the post were United States military veterans, but that is not a requirement to fill the position.

When the post of secretary is vacant, the deputy secretary or any other person designated by the president serves as acting secretary until the president nominates and the United States Senate confirms a new secretary.

== List of secretaries of veterans affairs ==
Parties

No party (2) Democratic (3) Republican (7)

Status

Acting secretary of veterans affairs

No.	Secretary			Term of office			President(s)
No.	Portrait	Name	State of residence	Took office	Left office	Term length	President(s)
1		Ed Derwinski	Illinois	March 15, 1989	September 26, 1992	3 years, 195 days	George H. W. Bush (1989–1993)
–		Anthony Principi^{[1]} Acting	California	September 26, 1992	January 20, 1993	116 days	George H. W. Bush (1989–1993)
2		Jesse Brown	Illinois	January 22, 1993	July 13, 1997	4 years, 172 days	Bill Clinton (1993–2001)
–		Hershel W. Gober^{[2]} Acting	Arkansas	July 13, 1997	January 2, 1998	173 days	Bill Clinton (1993–2001)
3		Togo D. West Jr.	District of Columbia	January 2, 1998^{[3]}	May 4, 1998	122 days	Bill Clinton (1993–2001)
3		Togo D. West Jr.	District of Columbia	May 4, 1998	July 25, 2000	2 years, 82 days	Bill Clinton (1993–2001)
–		Hershel W. Gober^{[2]} Acting	Arkansas	July 25, 2000	January 20, 2001	179 days	Bill Clinton (1993–2001)
4		Anthony Principi	California	January 23, 2001	January 26, 2005	4 years, 3 days	George W. Bush (2001–2009)
5		Jim Nicholson	Colorado	January 26, 2005	October 1, 2007	2 years, 248 days	George W. Bush (2001–2009)
–		Gordon H. Mansfield^{[4]} Acting	Florida	October 1, 2007	December 20, 2007	80 days	George W. Bush (2001–2009)
6		James Peake	District of Columbia	December 20, 2007	January 20, 2009	1 year, 31 days	George W. Bush (2001–2009)
7		Eric Shinseki	Hawaii	January 20, 2009	May 30, 2014	5 years, 130 days	Barack Obama (2009–2017)
–		Sloan D. Gibson; Acting	Alabama	May 30, 2014	July 30, 2014	61 days	Barack Obama (2009–2017)
8		Bob McDonald	Ohio	July 30, 2014	January 20, 2017	2 years, 174 days	Barack Obama (2009–2017)
–		Robert Snyder; Acting	West Virginia	January 20, 2017	February 14, 2017	25 days	Donald Trump (2017–2021)
9		David Shulkin	Pennsylvania	February 14, 2017	March 28, 2018	1 year, 42 days	Donald Trump (2017–2021)
–		Robert Wilkie; Acting	North Carolina	March 28, 2018	May 29, 2018	62 days	Donald Trump (2017–2021)
–		Peter O'Rourke; Acting	Virginia	May 29, 2018	July 30, 2018	62 days	Donald Trump (2017–2021)
10		Robert Wilkie	North Carolina	July 30, 2018	January 20, 2021	2 years, 174 days	Donald Trump (2017–2021)
–		Dat Tran; Acting	Ohio	January 20, 2021	February 9, 2021	20 days	Joe Biden (2021–2025)
11		Denis McDonough	Minnesota	February 9, 2021	January 20, 2025	3 years, 346 days	Joe Biden (2021–2025)
–	framelss	Todd B. Hunter; Acting		January 20, 2025	February 5, 2025	16 days	Donald Trump (2025–present)
12	framelss	Doug Collins	Georgia	February 5, 2025	Incumbent	1 year, 284 days	Donald Trump (2025–present)

^{1} Anthony Principi served as Acting Secretary in his capacity as Deputy Secretary of Veterans Affairs September 26, 1992 – January 20, 1993.

^{2} Hershel W. Gober served as Acting Secretary in his capacity as Deputy Secretary of Veterans Affairs July 13, 1997 – January 2, 1998 and July 25, 2000 – January 20, 2001.

^{3} West served as Acting Secretary from January 2, 1998 to May 4, 1998.

^{4} Gordon H. Mansfield served as Acting Secretary in his capacity as Deputy Secretary of Veterans Affairs October 1 – December 20, 2007.

== See also ==
- Administrator of Veterans Affairs
- Veterans Health Administration

U.S. order of precedence (ceremonial)
Preceded by Linda McMahon as Secretary of Education	Order of precedence of the United States as Secretary of Veterans Affairs	Succeeded by Markwayne Mullin as Secretary of Homeland Security
U.S. presidential line of succession
Preceded by Secretary of Education; Linda McMahon	17th in line	Succeeded by Secretary of Homeland Security; Markwayne Mullin
