= Jim Nicholson (American politician) =

American politician (born 1938)

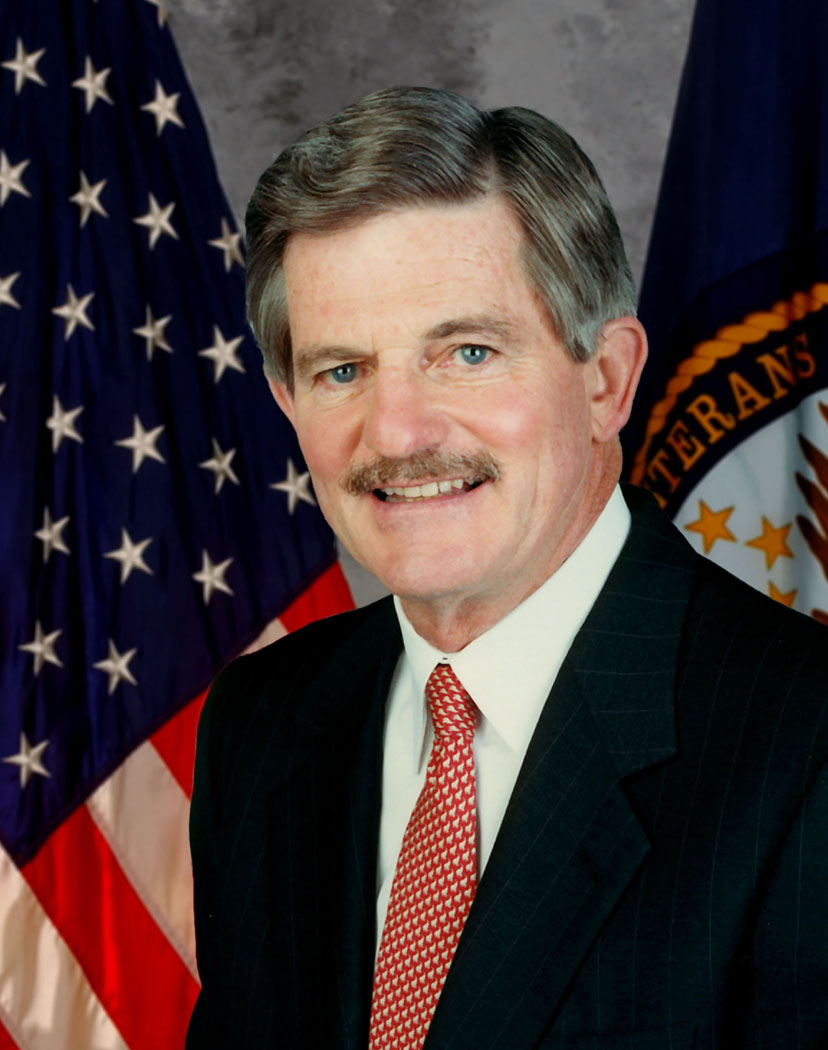
- Official portrait, 2005

5th United States Secretary of Veterans Affairs
- In office January 26, 2005 – October 1, 2007
- President: George W. Bush
- Preceded by: Anthony Principi
- Succeeded by: James Peake

6th United States Ambassador to the Holy See
- In office September 13, 2001 – January 26, 2005
- President: George W. Bush
- Preceded by: Lindy Boggs
- Succeeded by: Francis Rooney

Chair of the Republican National Committee
- In office January 17, 1997 – January 18, 2001
- Preceded by: Haley Barbour
- Succeeded by: Jim Gilmore

Personal details
- Born: Robert James Nicholson; February 4, 1938 (age 88) Struble, Iowa, U.S.
- Party: Republican
- Spouse: Suzanne Ferrell
- Children: 3
- Education: United States Military Academy (BS); Columbia University (MPP); University of Denver (JD)

Military service
- Allegiance: United States
- Branch/service: United States Army
- Years of service: 1961–1991
- Rank: Colonel
- Battles/wars: Vietnam War
- Awards: Bronze Star; Combat Infantryman Badge; Meritorious Service Medal; Vietnam Gallantry Cross; Air Medal (2)

Robert James Nicholson (born February 4, 1938) is an American attorney, politician, real estate developer, diplomat, and former Army officer who served as the fifth secretary of veterans affairs from 2005 to 2007. A member of the Republican Party, he served as U.S. Ambassador to the Holy See from 2001 to 2005, and was Chairman of the Republican National Committee (RNC) from 1997 to 2001.

== Personal life ==
Nicholson was born on a farm near Struble, Iowa. Nicholson has characterized his childhood as "growing up dirt poor in a tenant house without plumbing and sometimes without food". He is the brother of retired Army General John W. Nicholson.

Nicholson has a Master's degree in Public Policy from Columbia University. He received a J.D. degree from the University of Denver College of Law in 1972.

Nicholson is married to the former Suzanne Marie Ferrell of Highland Falls, New York, who is an accomplished artist. They are the parents of three children.

== Military service ==
He is a 1961 graduate of the United States Military Academy at West Point, New York, and served eight years in active duty in the United States Army. He was a paratrooper and Ranger-qualified Army officer. He fought in the Vietnam War, where he earned the Bronze Star, Combat Infantryman Badge, the Meritorious Service Medal with Oak Leaf Cluster, Republic of Vietnam Cross of Gallantry and two Air Medals. After serving eight years on active duty, he served 22 years in the United States Army Reserve, He retired in 1991 with the rank of colonel.

In 2005, he was awarded the Distinguished Graduate Award by the USMA.

== Legal and business career ==
Nicholson practiced law in Denver, Colorado, specializing in real estate, municipal finance and zoning law. In 1978 he founded Nicholson Enterprises, Inc., a developer of planned residential communities, and in 1987 he bought Renaissance Homes, a custom-home builder. Nicholson is senior counsel with Brownstein Hyatt Farber Schreck LLP. His practice includes public policy, health care, state and federal regulatory law, international relations, real estate, oil and gas, and alternative energy.

Nicholson completed his term as chair of the Daniels Fund when John Suthers succeeded him. He was chairman of the Federal Interagency Council on Homelessness, chairman of the Board of Open World Foundation, chairman of Volunteers of America of Colorado, and co-chairman of the advisory board of the Catholic Leadership Institute. He served as a director of New Day USA Residential Mortgage, LLC; Federated Mutual Funds; the Horatio Alger Association of Distinguished Americans; St. Mary Land and Exploration Company; Blue Cross Blue Shield of Colorado; Community Corrections Corporation; ITN Energy Systems, Inc.; and Lerch, Bates and Associates, Inc. He was a fellow of the U.S. Chamber of Commerce.

Nicholson has been honored with Honorary Doctorate of Public Service from Regis University; the University of Dallas, TX; John Cabot University, Rome; Ave Maria School of Law, Ann Arbor, MI; King's College, Wilkes Barre, PA; University of Denver College of Law; and the University of Rome, Italy. He gave the Commencement Address for the universities listed above, as well as the US Merchant Marine Academy. Additionally, he was recognized for by the Volunteers of America Ballington and Maude Booth Award for Public Service; President's Medal for Public Service, Georgetown University; Builder Hall of Fame by the National Association of Homebuilders; the Becket Fund "Canterbury Medal"; Annual "Top Irish American Award" by Irish American Magazine; and Military Chaplains Association 2007 Citizenship Award. He is a founding member of the American Battle Monuments Foundation.

== Political career ==
Nicholson has never held elected office, but has long been active in the Republican Party. In January 1986, he was elected committeeman from Colorado for the Republican National Committee (RNC). In 1993, he was elected vice-chairman of the RNC, and was the "surprise pick" for GOP national chairman in January 1997. He served in that role through the 2000 presidential election.

Between 2001 and 2005, Nicholson served as United States Ambassador to the Holy See. In 2003, Pope John Paul II knighted him with the Grand Cross for his leadership on human rights issues and standing for religious freedom. Order of Pius IX.

In 2016, according to a Foreign Agents Registration Act (FARA) Short Form Registration Statement dated October 21, 2016, Nicholson began working as "Senior Counsel" for the Ministry of Foreign Affairs for the Kingdom of Saudi Arabia. Working with other foreign agents hired by the lobbying firm of Brownstein, Hyatt, Farber, & Schreck, Nicholson's primary duties include facilitating & attending meetings with U.S. federal government officials on behalf of the Kingdom of Saudi Arabia.

== Works ==
- Nicholson, Jim (2002). The United States and the Holy See: the Long Road. Rome: 30Days Books.

Party political offices
Preceded by Haley Barbour	Chair of the Republican National Committee; 1997–2001	Succeeded by Jim Gilmore
Diplomatic posts
Preceded by Lindy Boggs	United States Ambassador to the Holy See; 2001–2005	Succeeded by Francis Rooney
Political offices
Preceded by Anthony Principi	United States Secretary of Veterans Affairs; 2005–2007	Succeeded by James Peake
U.S. order of precedence (ceremonial)
Preceded by Mike Leavitt as Former U.S. Cabinet Member	Order of precedence of the United States as Former U.S. Cabinet Member	Succeeded by Alberto Gonzales as Former U.S. Cabinet Member
