= Ed Derwinski =

American politician (1926–2012)

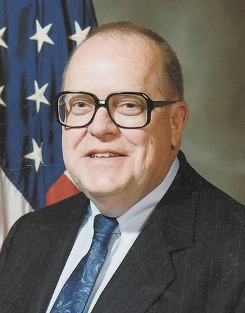

1st United States Secretary of Veterans Affairs
- In office March 15, 1989 – September 26, 1992
- President: George H. W. Bush
- Preceded by: Position established
- Succeeded by: Jesse Brown

Administrator of Veterans Affairs
- In office January 21, 1989 – March 15, 1989
- President: George H. W. Bush
- Preceded by: Thomas Turnage
- Succeeded by: Position abolished

8th Under Secretary of State for International Security Affairs
- In office March 24, 1987 – January 21, 1989
- President: Ronald Reagan
- Preceded by: William Schneider
- Succeeded by: Reginald Bartholomew

22nd Counselor of the United States Department of State
- In office March 23, 1983 – March 24, 1987
- President: Ronald Reagan
- Preceded by: James L. Buckley
- Succeeded by: Max Kampelman

Member of the U.S. House of Representatives from Illinois's 4th district
- In office January 3, 1959 – January 3, 1983
- Preceded by: William E. McVey
- Succeeded by: George M. O'Brien

Member of the Illinois House of Representatives
- In office January 1957 – January 3, 1959

Personal details
- Born: Edward Joseph Derwinski; September 15, 1926 Chicago, Illinois, U.S.
- Died: January 15, 2012 (aged 85) Oak Brook, Illinois, U.S.
- Resting place: Arlington National Cemetery
- Party: Republican
- Spouse(s): Patricia van der Giessen; Bonnie Hickey
- Children: 2
- Education: Loyola University, Chicago (BS)

Military service
- Allegiance: United States
- Branch/service: United States Army
- Years of service: 1944–1946
- Unit: Infantry
- Battles/wars: World War II

Edward Joseph Derwinski (September 15, 1926 – January 15, 2012) was an American politician who served as the first Cabinet-level United States Secretary of Veterans Affairs, serving under President George H. W. Bush from March 15, 1989 to September 26, 1992. He previously served as a member of the United States House of Representatives from 1959 to 1983, representing south and southwest suburbs of Chicago.

== Early life ==
He was born in Chicago, Illinois, on September 15, 1926, to Sophia Zmijewski and Casimir Ignatius Derwinski, who died in 1947. He attended Loyola University of Chicago. Derwinski served in the United States Army in the Pacific Theater during World War II and in the postwar U.S. occupation of Japan. He graduated from Loyola University Chicago in 1951. He was a celebrated member of Alpha Delta Gamma National Fraternity.

== Legislative career ==
In 1957, he was elected to the Illinois House of Representatives, where he served one term before winning election to the U.S. House of Representatives in 1958. He served 12 terms as a Republican representative from the 4th District of Illinois, a suburban region south and west of Chicago, eventually becoming ranking member of the House Foreign Affairs Committee (known for some periods as the International Relations Committee). He also served as a delegate to the United Nations General Assembly 1971–1972 and as chairman of the U.S. delegation to the Interparliamentary Union from 1970–1972 and 1978-1980.

In October 1978, Derwinski agreed to accompany fellow US representative Leo Ryan in his investigation of Jonestown in November 1978. Derwinski was added to comply with Foreign Affairs Committee guidelines on travel, which suggested multiple people. Derwinski backed out later on; during this visit, Ryan was murdered and the members of the Peoples Temple committed mass suicide.

== Executive career ==
A Democratic redistricting plan after the 1980 Census carved up the 4th District, with only about 15% of its territory being retained and added to various territory from other districts; Derwinski and fellow Republican congressman George M. O'Brien were placed in the same district, and O'Brien won the 1982 primary on the strength of having more of his previous district included in the new configuration. After Derwinski's loss, President Ronald Reagan appointed him Counselor to the State Department. In 1987, Reagan appointed him Under Secretary of State for Security Assistance, Science and Technology, where he served until the end of Reagan's term, shortly after which he was appointed Administrator of Veterans Affairs, in charge of the Veterans Administration, which was elevated to cabinet-level status as the Department of Veterans Affairs in 1989, making Derwinski the first Secretary of Veterans Affairs.

== Advocacy ==
A Polish American, Derwinski was noted for his efforts on behalf of Eastern Europe throughout his career. Notably, he aided in the rehabilitation of the Serbian Royalist general Draža Mihailović. Mihailović had received the Legion of Merit for his resistance efforts against the Axis—but this information was marked "secret" at the behest of the State Department so as not to harm relations with Marshal Tito, the current ruler of Yugoslavia in 1967. Tito was Mihailović's rival in World War II, and after Tito's forces emerged triumphant, Mihailović was accused of collaboration with the Nazis and executed. At the urging of airmen involved in Operation Halyard who had been saved by Mihailović's forces and had heard rumors of the award to him, Derwinski insisted that the State Department make the text of President Truman's citation public, confirming that Mihailović had not collaborated. Derwinski served as head of "Ethnic Americans for Dole/Kemp" during the 1996 presidential election.

== Post-politics ==
Derwinski resided in Glen Ellyn, Illinois with his wife, the former Bonita Hickey, known as Bonnie. He had two adult children, Maureen and Michael, from his first marriage to Patricia Derwinski.

Derwinski died in a nursing home from Merkel cell carcinoma, on January 15, 2012, at age 85. He was buried in Arlington National Cemetery in Arlington, Virginia.

On learning of his death, former United States Senator Peter Fitzgerald (R-IL) described Derwinski as "a giant in Illinois politics [...] [H]e had incredible connections in all the different ethnic neighborhoods in Chicago, he was really loved by everybody on both sides."

U.S. House of Representatives
Preceded by William McVey	Member of the U.S. House of Representatives from Illinois's 4th congressional district 1959–1983	Succeeded by George O'Brien
Party political offices
New office	Chair of the Republican Study Committee; 1973	Succeeded by Del Clawson
Political offices
Preceded by James Buckley	Counselor of the United States Department of State; 1983–1987	Succeeded by Max Kampelman
Preceded by William Schneider	Undersecretary of State for International Security Affairs; 1987–1989	Succeeded by Reginald Bartholomew
Preceded by Thomas Turnage	Administrator of Veterans Affairs; 1989	Position abolished
New office	United States Secretary of Veterans Affairs; 1989–1992	Succeeded by Jesse Brown
