= National Sculpture Society =

American professional art organization

Founded in 1893, the National Sculpture Society (NSS) was the first organization of professional sculptors formed in the United States. The purpose of the organization was to promote the welfare of American sculptors, although its founding members included several renowned architects. The founding members included such well known figures of the day as Daniel Chester French, Augustus St. Gaudens, Richard Morris Hunt, and Stanford White as well as sculptors less familiar today, such as Herbert Adams, Paul W. Bartlett, Karl Bitter, J. Massey Rhind, Attilio Piccirilli, and John Quincy Adams Ward—who served as the first president for the society.

Since its founding in the nineteenth century, the National Sculpture Society (NSS) has remained dedicated to promoting figurative and realistic sculpture. During the years 1919 to 1924, four works commissioned from members of the National Sculpture Society were funded by philanthropist Paul Goodloe McIntire, including George Rogers Clark (1921) by Robert Ingersoll Aitken at Charlottesville, Virginia. Membership worldwide in 2006 was around 4,000 members, including sculptors, architects, art historians, and conservators. Its headquarters, library, and gallery are located in midtown Manhattan.

In 1951, the NSS started publishing Sculpture Review, a quarterly magazine. The name of the NSS publication was changed in 2024 to "Sculpture Quarterly".

Past presidents of the society have included John Quincy Adams Ward, James Earle Fraser, Chester Beach, Wheeler Williams, Leo Friedlander, Neil Estern, and Cecil de Blaquiere Howard.

The first woman to gain admission into the NSS was Theo Alice Ruggles Kitson, in 1893. She was followed a few years later by Enid Yandell and Bessie Potter Vonnoh in 1898; Janet Scudder in 1904; Anna Hyatt Huntington in 1905 and Evelyn Longman and Abastenia St. Leger Eberle in 1906. In 1946, Richmond Barthé was likely the first African-American to be admitted.

In 1994, the NSS held their first exhibition outside the United States at the Palazzo Mediceo Di Seravezza in Italy. Titled “100 Years of the National Sculpture Society of the United States of America in Italy” it ran from the 16th of July through the 4th of September and was curated by Nicky and Stanley Bleifeld along with Costantino Paolicchi in collaboration with Lodovico Gierut and Paolo Giorgi. Among the 60 notable American sculptors whose work was selected for the exhibition were Stanley Bleifeld, Andrew DeVries, Neil Estern, Leonda Finke, Bruno Lucchesi, Barbara Lekberg, Richard MacDonald and Elliott Offner.
