= Togo D. West Jr. =

American politician (1942–2018)

Togo West
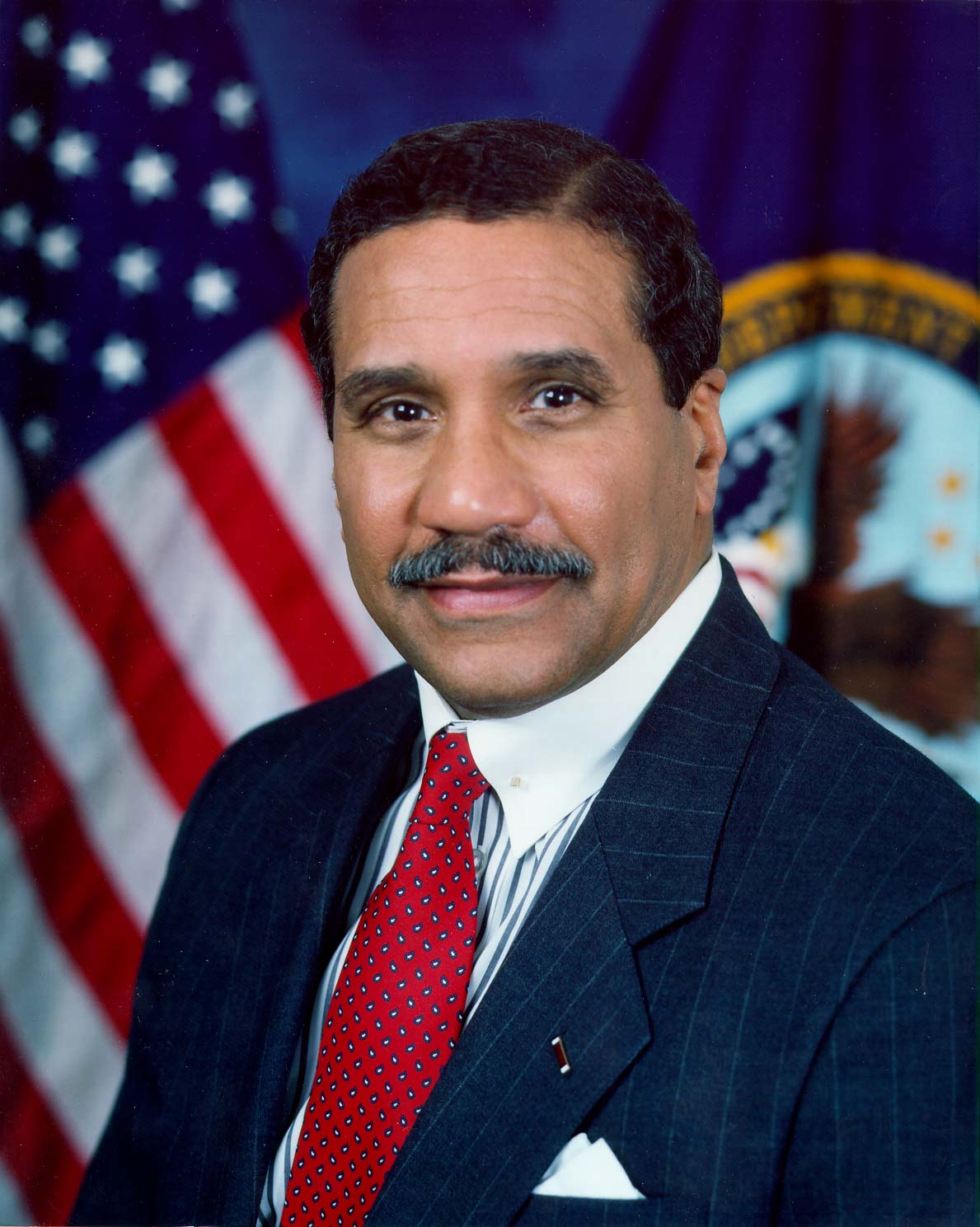
- Official portrait, 1998

3rd United States Secretary of Veterans Affairs
- In office May 4, 1998 – July 25, 2000
- President: Bill Clinton
- Preceded by: Jesse Brown
- Succeeded by: Anthony Principi

16th United States Secretary of the Army
- In office November 22, 1993 – May 4, 1998
- President: Bill Clinton
- Preceded by: Michael P. W. Stone
- Succeeded by: Louis Caldera

General Counsel of the Department of Defense
- In office February 1, 1980 – January 20, 1981
- President: Jimmy Carter
- Preceded by: Deanne C. Siemer
- Succeeded by: William Howard Taft IV

General Counsel of the Navy
- In office April 22, 1977 – January 13, 1979
- President: Jimmy Carter
- Preceded by: Grey Lewis
- Succeeded by: Coleman Hicks

Personal details
- Born: Togo Dennis West Jr. June 21, 1942 Winston-Salem, North Carolina, U.S.
- Died: March 8, 2018 (aged 75) Caribbean Sea between Barbados and Puerto Rico
- Resting place: Arlington National Cemetery; Arlington, Virginia
- Party: Democratic
- Spouse: Gail Berry
- Children: 2
- Education: Howard University (BS, JD)

Military service
- Branch/service: United States Army
- Years of service: 1965–1973
- Rank: Captain
- Unit: J.A.G. Corps
- Awards: Legion of Merit; Meritorious Service Medal; Order of Military Merit

Togo Dennis West Jr. (June 21, 1942 – March 8, 2018) was an American attorney and Army officer who served as the third secretary of veterans affairs in the administration of President Bill Clinton from 1998 until his resignation in 2000. A member of the Democratic Party, he was the second African American to be Secretary of Veterans Affairs. West previously served as the 16th secretary of the army from 1993 to 1998, as General Counsel of the Department of Defense from 1980 to 1981, and as General Counsel of the Navy from 1977 to 1979.

== Early life ==
West was born in Winston-Salem, North Carolina, where he became an Eagle Scout with Bronze Palms, and attended Atkins High School (where his parents were teachers), graduating as valedictorian in June 1960.

He subsequently entered Howard University, obtaining a Bachelor of Science degree in electrical engineering in 1965. He received his Juris Doctor degree from the Howard University School of Law in 1968, receiving cum laude honors and graduating first in his class.

While a freshman at Howard University, he became a brother of Zeta Phi chapter of Alpha Phi Omega service fraternity. West was a member of the Kappa Psi chapter of Omega Psi Phi fraternity.

== Early career ==
While a law student at Howard, West became the managing editor for the Howard Law Journal. Around that time, he met Gail Berry, who later became his wife.

A member of St. John's Episcopal Church, Lafayette Square, he served as a vestryman and Senior Warden.

West was a member of the National Executive Board of the Boy Scouts of America, the organization's governing body. He was named a Distinguished Eagle Scout by the Boy Scouts of America and was awarded the Silver Buffalo Award for his national contributions to America's youth. He previously served as the president of the National Capital Area Council of the Boy Scouts of America.

== Military and government career ==
After completing law school and clerking for federal District Judge Harold R. Tyler Jr., West entered the United States Army. He was in the Army Field Artillery Corps from 1965 to 1968, then attended The JAG School at the University of Virginia. He entered U.S. Army JAG Corps, and he served as an Army lawyer from 1969 to 1973.

From his military service, he earned the Legion of Merit and the Meritorious Service Medal. He subsequently practiced law at the firm of Covington & Burling before being appointed an associate deputy attorney general in the administration of President Gerald Ford.

West held several posts in the administration of Jimmy Carter: General Counsel of the Navy (1977–79), Special Assistant to the Secretary and to the Deputy Secretary of Defense (1979), and General Counsel of the Department of Defense (1980–81). As the Secretary of the Army, West weighed in on the Aberdeen scandal, prompting stricter enforcement and investigation into the Army's sexual harassment policies.

West returned to private practice in 1981 with the firm of Patterson Belknap Webb & Tyler and later worked as senior vice president for government relations of the Northrop Corporation until he became a member of the Clinton administration. In 1996, as Secretary of the Army, West earned the Grand-Officer of the Order of Military Merit by the Brazilian President Fernando Henrique Cardoso.

West was nominated by President Bill Clinton on January 27, 1998, during Clinton's second term, and was confirmed by the Senate on May 4, 1998. He had previously served as Secretary of the Army from 1993 to 1998. From January 2, 1998, through May 4, 1998, he served a dual role as Acting Secretary of Veterans Affairs and Secretary of the Army while awaiting confirmation as Secretary of Veterans Affairs.

== Post-government career ==
After leaving office, West practiced law and served on the boards of various institutions. From 2004 to 2006, he served as president of the Joint Center for Political and Economic Studies, a Washington-based think tank focused on issues of concern to minorities. He was a strong supporter of and past board member of the Mount Vernon preservation society.

West and former Chief of Naval Operations retired admiral Vernon Clark led the Defense Department's investigation into the Fort Hood massacre, issuing a report in January 2010.

West died of a heart attack on March 8, 2018, at the age of 75, while on a cruise between Barbados and Puerto Rico. He was interred at Arlington National Cemetery on April 26, 2018.

== See also ==
- List of African-American United States Cabinet members

Political offices
Preceded by Grey Lewis	General Counsel of the Navy; 1977–1979	Succeeded by Coleman Hicks
Preceded by Gordon Sullivan; Acting	United States Secretary of the Army; 1993–1997	Succeeded by Mike Walker; Acting
Preceded by Jesse Brown	United States Secretary of Veterans Affairs; 1998–2000	Succeeded by Anthony Principi
