= W. Scott Gould =

American government official (born 1957)

Scott Gould
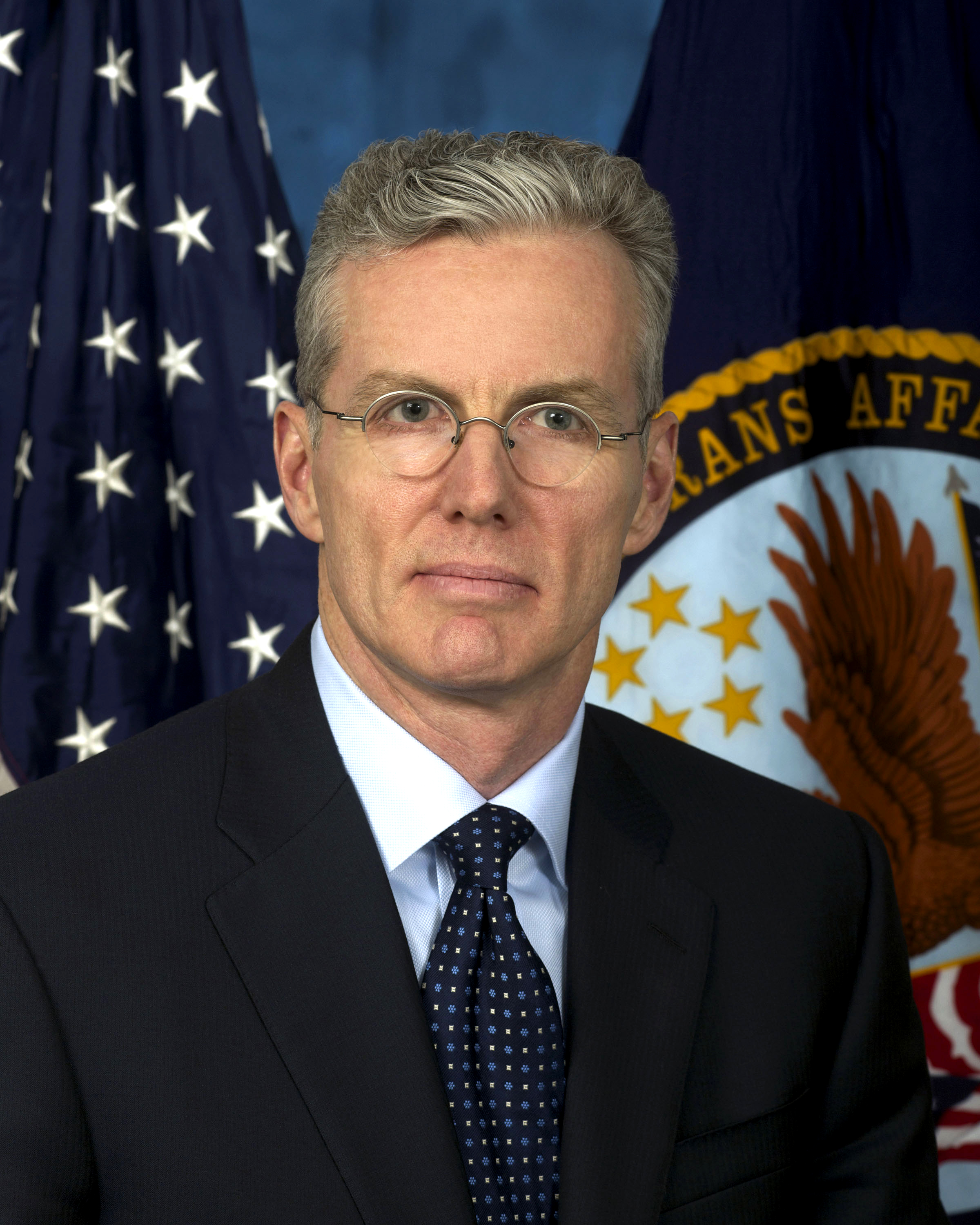
- Gould in 2009

5th United States Deputy Secretary of Veterans Affairs
- In office April 2, 2009 – May 17, 2013
- President: Barack Obama
- Preceded by: Gordon H. Mansfield
- Succeeded by: Sloan D. Gibson

Personal details
- Born: William Scott Gould; July 19, 1957 (age 69) Topsfield, Massachusetts, U.S.
- Spouse: Michèle Flournoy
- Children: 3
- Education: Cornell University (BA); University of Rochester (MBA, DEd)

Military service
- Allegiance: United States
- Branch/service: United States Navy: United States Navy Reserve
- Years of service: 1979-2006
- Rank: Captain
- Battles/wars: Operation Noble Eagle; Operation Enduring Freedom

William Scott Gould (born July 19, 1957) is a former United States Deputy Secretary of Veterans Affairs. Gould is also an elected fellow of the National Academy of Public Administration.

== Early life and education ==
Gould was born in Topsfield, Massachusetts. He holds a B.A. degree from Cornell University and MBA and Ed.D. degrees from the University of Rochester.

== Military service ==
He is a retired captain who served for 26 years in the United States Navy and United States Navy Reserve. During his initial active duty commitment, he served at sea aboard the guided missile destroyer USS Richard E. Byrd. Separating from active duty and affiliating in the then-Naval Reserve, he transitioned to the intelligence community. As a Naval Intelligence reservist, CAPT Gould was recalled to active duty for Operation Noble Eagle and Operation Enduring Freedom.

== Career ==
=== Clinton and Bush administrations ===
From 1993 to 1994, Gould served as a White House Fellow in the Export-Import Bank of the United States and in the Office of the White House Chief of Staff.

From 1994 to 1997, Gould has also served as deputy assistant secretary for finance and management at the Department of Treasury; he served from 1997 to 2001 as chief financial officer and assistant secretary for administration at the Department of Commerce.

From 2001 to 2002, he served as deputy to the Director of the Naval Criminal Investigative Service.

=== Business career ===
Gould was also chief executive officer of The O'Gara Company from 2002 to 2004, an investment services firm, and COO of Exolve, a technology services company. Immediately prior to his appointment at the VA, Gould was vice president for "public sector strategy" at IBM Global Business Services from 2004 to 2009. He is co-author (with Linda Bilmes) of the best-selling book The People Factor: Strengthening America by Investing in Public Service.

=== Obama administration ===
After President Obama's election, he served as co-chair of the VA Agency Review Team for the Presidential Transition Team. He was confirmed to be Deputy Secretary of Veterans Affairs on April 2, 2009, to replace Gordon H. Mansfield, who resigned on January 20, 2009. Gould resigned on May 17, 2013.

He was then appointed executive vice president at CareFirst, the Blue Cross and Blue Shield plan of Maryland.

== Personal life ==
Gould is married to Michèle Flournoy, the former Under Secretary of Defense for Policy. They have three children and reside in Bethesda, Maryland.
