= Bob McDonald (businessman) =

American businessman and politician (born 1953)

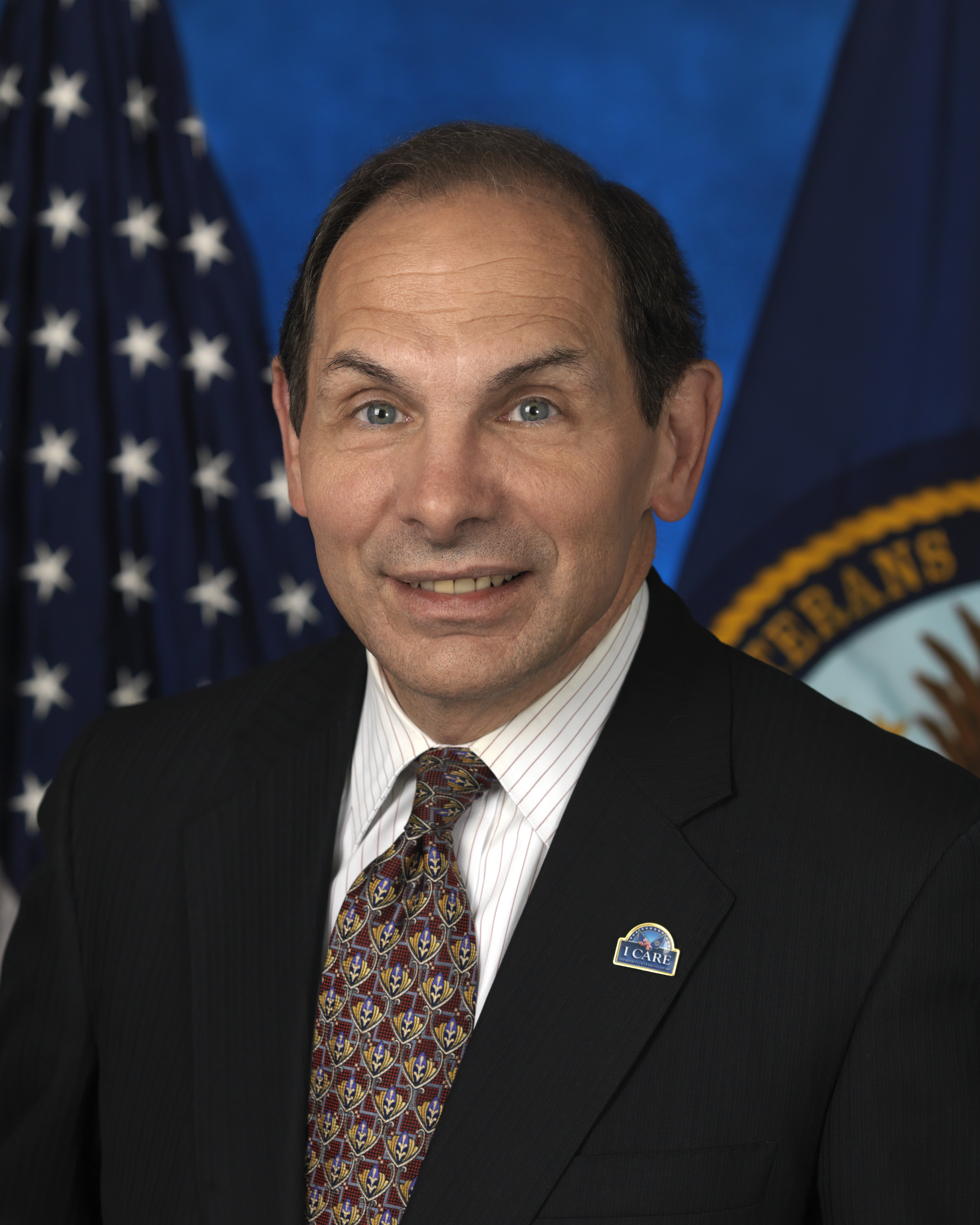
- Official portrait, 2014

8th United States Secretary of Veterans Affairs
- In office July 30, 2014 – January 20, 2017
- President: Barack Obama
- Deputy: Sloan Gibson
- Preceded by: Eric Shinseki
- Succeeded by: David Shulkin

Personal details
- Born: Robert Alan McDonald; June 20, 1953 (age 73) Gary, Indiana, U.S.
- Party: Republican
- Spouse: Diane McDonald
- Children: 2
- Education: United States Military Academy (BS); University of Utah (MBA)

Military service
- Branch/service: United States Army
- Years of service: 1975–1980
- Rank: Captain
- Unit: 82nd Airborne Division
- Awards: Meritorious Service Medal

Robert Alan McDonald (born June 20, 1953) is an American businessman and former government official who served as the eighth United States secretary of veterans affairs from 2014 until 2017. He was previously chairman, president, and CEO of Procter & Gamble.

== Early life and education ==
McDonald was born on June 20, 1953, in Gary, Indiana, and grew up in Chicago. He graduated from the United States Military Academy at West Point in 1975 in the top 2% of his class with a Bachelor of Science degree in Engineering. At West Point he served as the Brigade Adjutant for the Corps of Cadets and was awarded the Silver Medal from the Royal Society for the Encouragement of Arts, Manufacturing and Commerce. After graduation, he served in the U.S. Army for five years, primarily in the 82nd Airborne Division, attaining the rank of captain, He has completed Jungle, Arctic, and Desert Warfare Training, and has also earned the Ranger Tab, Expert Infantryman Badge, and Senior Parachutist Wings. He earned an MBA from the University of Utah in 1978. Upon leaving the military he received the Meritorious Service Medal.

== Career ==
=== Procter & Gamble ===
McDonald joined Procter & Gamble in 1980 and worked in various roles before becoming president and Chief Executive in 2009. He assumed the Chairman of the Board role 2010. As chief executive officer, McDonald oversaw a $10 billion restructuring plan.

Amid the 2008 economic downturn, investors criticized McDonald for being too attached to P&G traditions, too slow to pursue layoffs and other cuts, and unable to produce new product innovations, particularly compared to his predecessor A.G. Lafley. He resigned from P&G in 2013 following pressure from the company board and activist investors such as Bill Ackman; he was replaced by Lafley, who returned from retirement.

In 2014, McDonald led a community-based task force to help the city of Cincinnati renovate its Museum Center, which succeeded when Hamilton County passed a tax levy to fund the initiative.

=== U.S. Secretary of Veterans Affairs ===
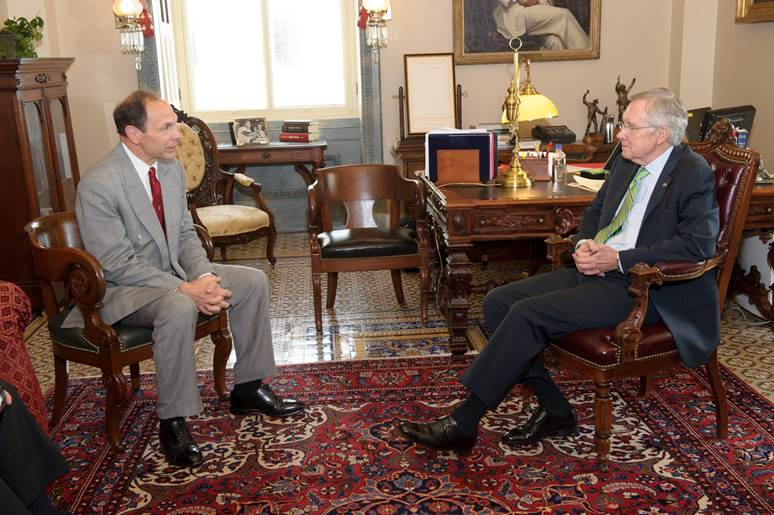
Senate Majority Leader Harry Reid meeting with Veterans Affairs nominee Robert McDonald on July 16, 2014

McDonald succeeded Eric Shinseki, who resigned in 2014, due to the Veterans Health Administration scandal of 2014.

In 2014, U.S. President Obama nominated McDonald to the Cabinet position of United States Secretary of Veterans Affairs.

Another important decision by McDonald was the creation of the Veterans Experience Office which addressed the critical concern of how Veterans received better service from the VA.

One of McDonald's first acts under the new office was the hiring of Tom Allin in 2015 as the agency's first chief veteran experience officer to address the agency's treatment of veterans.

The decision by McDonald to bring private sector experience to VA in the hiring of Allin, and, his realignment the agency under 12 breakthrough priorities created organizational change that led to a reduction in disability claim backlogs for the agency, its lowest since 2009.

Obama cited McDonald's business background with P&G and experience revitalizing organizations in his decision. McDonald was approved by the United States Senate Committee on Veterans' Affairs and the full Senate by unanimous vote.

McDonald recruited new medical personnel in the early months of his tenure at VA. As of June 2015, VA had increased onboard staff.

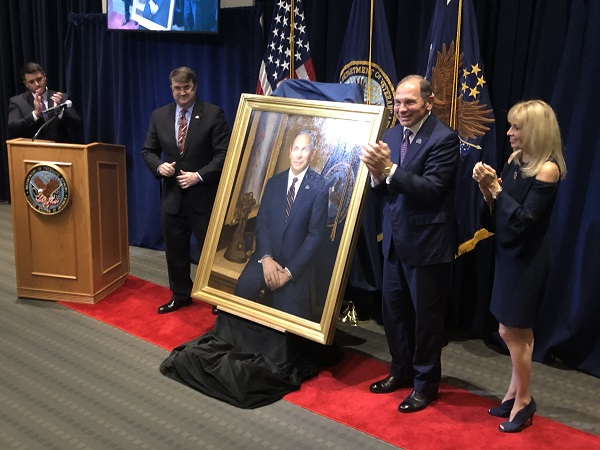
McDonald in 2019

McDonald opposed privatization of the VA. Donald Trump replaced him with David Shulkin, who also opposed privatization, and was also replaced.

In 2015, McDonald admitted he misspoke trying to engage a homeless veteran about his serving in the U.S. Army Special Forces, a conversation that was recorded by a CBS television news crew accompanying him during a nationwide count of homeless veterans. However, he told The Huffington Post, which first broke the story, that "he was not in the special forces".

McDonald implemented a new program called MyVA in order to help modernize VA's culture, processes, and capabilities. The program expanded Veteran access by focusing on staffing, space, productivity, and VA Community Care while driving down a backlog of disability claims. As a part of MyVA, strategic partnerships and collaborative relationships were created that cut veteran homelessness by half since 2010, and, helped 34 communities and three states to bring a functional end to Veteran homelessness. Medical and surgical equipment supply chain reforms also achieved nearly $230 million in cost avoidance the very first year of the program.

By the end of Secretary McDonald's tenure, Veterans at all VA Medical Centers had access to same-day services in primary care and mental health care. In November 2016, nearly 97 percent of Veteran appointments were being completed within 30 days of the clinically indicated or Veteran's preferred date and 85 percent were being completed within 7 days. Average wait times for completed appointments were less than 5 days for primary care, about 6 days for specialty care, and under 3 days for mental health care.

When receiving the 2024 Sylvanus Thayer Award from the West Point Association of Graduates, former President Barack Obama stated that McDonald was "one of the best Secretaries of Veterans Affairs this country has ever had".

== Affiliations ==
McDonald is Chairman of the Board of the West Point Association of Graduates, and Chairman of the Board of the Elizabeth Dole Foundation. He currently serves on the Audia Group and Every Cure Board of Advisors.

== Philanthropy ==
McDonald and his wife, Diane, founded the McDonald Conference for Leaders of Character.

McDonald donated a statue of General Ulysses S. Grant that was unveiled on April 25, 2019, on The Plain at West Point.

== Recognition ==
In 2010, the University of Utah Alumni Association named McDonald a Distinguished Graduate.

In 2014, McDonald received the Public Service Star from the Republic of Singapore.

The West Point Association of Graduates named McDonald for its Distinguished Graduate Award in 2017. In 2021, the American Chamber of Commerce Foundation gave Bob its President's Award for Lifetime Achievement. In 2023, the New England Center and Home for Veterans gave McDonald its Distinguished Service to Veterans Award. McDonald was named the Non-Profit Director of The Year by the National Association of Corporate Directors (NACD) in 2024.

In July 2020, McDonald was appointed by the George W. Bush Institute as the April and Jay Graham Fellow, where he serves as a member of the Military Service Initiative team. In September 2020, McDonald was selected by presidential nominee Joe Biden to be a member of his transition team's advisory board.

In 2007, McDonald received the inaugural Leadership Excellence Award from the U.S. Naval Academy and Harvard Business Review. He served on the Board of Directors of Xerox, the McKinsey Advisory Council, and the Singapore International Advisory Council of the Economic Development Board.

== Personal life ==
McDonald and his wife, Diane, have two children.

Political offices
| Preceded by Eric Shinseki | United States Secretary of Veterans Affairs; 2014–2017 | Succeeded by David Shulkin |
U.S. order of precedence (ceremonial)
| Preceded by Julian Castro as Former U.S. Cabinet Member | Order of precedence of the United States as Former U.S. Cabinet Member | Succeeded by Loretta Lynch as Former U.S. Cabinet Member |
