= Jesse Brown =

American governmental official

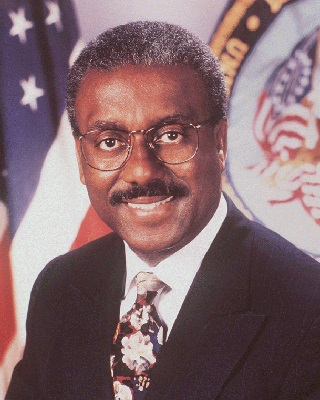

2nd United States Secretary of Veterans Affairs
- In office January 22, 1993 – July 13, 1997
- President: Bill Clinton
- Preceded by: Ed Derwinski
- Succeeded by: Togo West

Personal details
- Born: March 27, 1944 Detroit, Michigan, U.S.
- Died: August 15, 2002 (aged 58) Warrenton, Virginia, U.S.
- Resting place: Arlington National Cemetery
- Party: Democratic
- Spouse: Sylvia Scott
- Children: 2
- Education: City Colleges of Chicago (attended); Roosevelt University (attended); Catholic University (attended)

Military service
- Branch/service: United States Marine Corps
- Years of service: 1963–1965
- Rank: Corporal
- Battles/wars: Vietnam War

Jesse Brown (March 27, 1944 – August 15, 2002) was an American politician and Marine Corps veteran who served as the second United States secretary of veterans affairs under President Bill Clinton from 1993 to 1997.

== Early life ==
Jesse Brown was born on March 27, 1944, in Detroit, Michigan, to Lucille Marsh Brown and David Brown. He grew up in Chicago, Illinois, and graduated with honors from the City Colleges of Chicago. Married to Sylvia Scott Brown, they had two children, N. Scott Brown and Carmen Brown.

== Military service ==
He enlisted in the United States Marine Corps in 1963, and served as a Marine in the Vietnam War, reaching the rank of corporal. He was seriously injured in 1965 near Da Nang when he was shot in the right arm, which was left partially paralyzed.

Returning to Chicago, in 1967 Brown became active in Disabled American Veterans (DAV), a service and advocacy organization founded in 1920 to assist disabled veterans. He began taking classes at Roosevelt University in Chicago. Moving to DAV's national office in Washington, D.C., he began taking classes at The Catholic University of America.

== Veterans service ==
=== DAV ===
In 1967, Brown joined the staff of Disabled American Veterans. He served in various supervisory roles with DAV in the 1970s and 1980s:

- 1973 — supervisor of National Service Office in Washington, D.C.
- 1976 — supervisor of National Appeals Office
- 1981 — Chief of Claims, National Service and Legislative Headquarters
- 1983 — Deputy National Service Director

In 1988, Brown became DAV's first African-American executive director, serving until 1993.

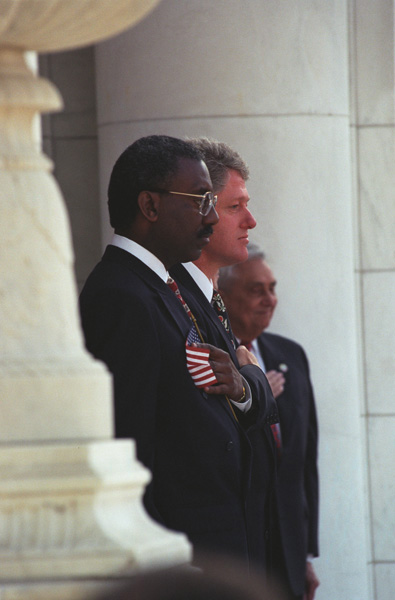
Jesse Brown and President Bill Clinton at the Veterans Day ceremony at Arlington National Cemetery (1993)

=== Secretary of Veterans Affairs ===
In January 1993, Brown was selected by President Bill Clinton to the post of Secretary of Veterans Affairs, serving until July 1997. He was the first African American to hold that post. He is also the first former enlisted member of the United States Armed Forces named Secretary of the Department of Veterans Affairs. During his tenure, Brown expanded the services offered to female veterans, homeless veterans, and veterans who were ill due to chemical exposures in Vietnam or the Gulf War. After he resigned as secretary, Brown founded a consulting firm, Brown and Associates.

=== Disabled veterans' memorial ===
Brown was one of three people who provided the impetus for the creation of the American Veterans Disabled for Life Memorial, a national memorial in Washington, D.C., which honors disabled veterans. In 1998, philanthropist Lois Pope realized there was no memorial to disabled veterans in the nation's capital. Although she did not know him, Pope called Brown's Veterans Affairs office to plead for a memorial. Pope called every day for the next six months, until finally Brown's secretary put her call through. Brown agreed to support legislation establishing a memorial. Brown introduced Pope to Art Wilson, the National Adjutant (e.g., chief executive officer) of DAV. DAV was itself not a 501 (c)(3) nonprofit, and thus Pope and Wilson agreed that a new foundation, the American Veterans Disabled for Life Memorial Foundation (AVDLMF; also known as the Disabled Veterans' LIFE Memorial Foundation) should be created. Brown left office in 1997. Brown, Pope, and Wilson incorporated the foundation in 1998, and Wilson was named its president. Brown served as the executive director of the American Disabled Veterans Disabled for Life Memorial Foundation until his death.

The three individuals and their supporters began lobbying Congress to win passage of the necessary federal legislation. Congress quickly approved the bill, and President Clinton signed it into law (Public Law 106–348) on October 24, 2000. After a decade of fundraising, the memorial began construction in 2011. It was dedicated by President Barack Obama on October 5, 2014. Two quotations by Brown are featured on the memorial.

== Death ==
Brown died in Warrenton, Virginia on August 15, 2002, of lower motor neuron syndrome. He had been diagnosed with amyotrophic lateral sclerosis (ALS), commonly known as Lou Gehrig's Disease, since 1999. His funeral was held at the Washington National Cathedral, and he was buried in Arlington National Cemetery.

He was survived by his wife, Sylvia, and his children Carmen and Scott.

The DAV established the Jesse Brown Memorial Youth Scholarship in his honor. Eight scholarships are awarded each year to youth volunteers (aged 21 or younger) who have worked to assist disabled veterans and advanced the cause of disabled veterans' rights in the name of DAV. Scholarships are awarded in the following amounts: • One scholarship of $20,000 • One scholarship of $15,000 • One scholarship of $10,000 • Two scholarships of $7,500 • Three scholarships of $5,000

In May 2004, the West Side VA Medical Center in Chicago was renamed the Jesse Brown VA Medical Center in his honor.

== See also ==
- Disabled American Veterans
- List of African-American United States Cabinet members
- Vietnam Veterans of America

== Notes ==
Political offices
Preceded by Ed Derwinski	United States Secretary of Veterans Affairs; 1993–1997	Succeeded by Togo West
