= Civil service =

Government workers that are employed rather than elected or appointed

The civil service, also referred to in some countries as the public service (and not the same as the public sector), is a collective term for a sector of government composed mainly of career civil service personnel hired rather than elected, whose institutional tenure typically survives transitions of political leadership. A civil service official, also known as a civil servant or public servant or public employee, is a person employed in the public sector by a government department or agency for public sector undertakings. Civil servants include workers at any level of government, and in a healthy civil service answer to that government, not a political party.

The extent of civil servants of a state as part of the "civil service" varies from country to country. In the United Kingdom (UK), for instance, only Crown (national government) employees are referred to as "civil servants" whereas employees of local authorities (counties, cities and similar administrations) are generally referred to as "local government officers", who are considered public servants but not civil servants. Thus, in the UK, a civil servant is a public servant but a public servant is not necessarily a civil servant.

The study of the civil service is a part of the field of public service (and in some countries there is no distinction between the two). Staff members in "non-departmental public bodies" (sometimes called "QUANGOs") may also be classed as civil servants for the purpose of statistics and possibly for their terms and conditions. Collectively a state's civil servants form its civil service or public service. The concept arose in China and modern civil service developed in Britain in the 18th century.

An international civil servant or international staff member is a civilian employee who is employed by an intergovernmental organization. These international civil servants do not resort under any national legislation (from which they have immunity of jurisdiction) but are governed by internal staff regulations. All disputes related to international civil service are brought before special tribunals created by these international organizations such as, for instance, the Administrative Tribunal of the ILO. Specific referral can be made to the International Civil Service Commission (ICSC) of the United Nations, an independent expert body established by the United Nations General Assembly. Its mandate is to regulate and coordinate the conditions of service of staff in the United Nations common system, while promoting and maintaining high standards in the international civil service.

== History ==
=== In China ===
Under the Zhou, official posts were provided to the aristocracy of the imperial and state clans and dispensed at their patronage. The Warring States and Qin Empire gradually replacing the varied ancient states with fairly standardized counties and disempowered much of the aristocracy in favor of officials appointed by the central governments, the early beginnings of the modern meritocratic civil service.

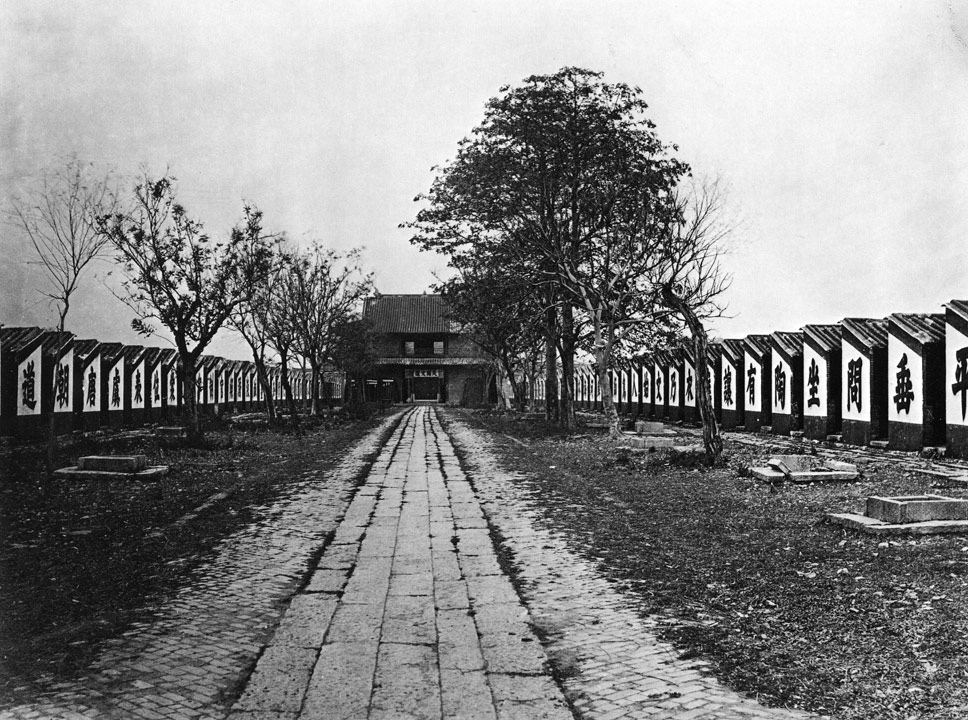
Imperial Civil Service Examination hall with 7500 cells in Guangdong, 1873

The Han initially maintained dozens of allied kingdoms, restored parts of the earlier aristocracy, and only directly staffed the commanderies around Chang'an in the west, but this system was quickly ended after widespread revolts and even defections to the Xiongnu. By 134 BC during the reign of the Wu Emperor, the bureaucracy was so widespread and needful of reliable manpower that the xiaolian system was instituted. Each commandery head was made responsible for nominating talented candidates, vouching—and becoming personally liable—for their unswerving filial piety (i.e. loyalty) and incorruptibility. Eventually public schools were provided for this purpose: the Imperial University under the Wu Emperor and local academies under the Ping Emperor in AD 3. Efforts were made to base appointments—especially in the military—solely on merit, but personal relationships continued to play a major role, particularly for the highest offices such as chancellor.

This tendency was only strengthened by the nine-rank system instituted by Cao Wei during the Three Kingdoms Period and continued under the Jin dynasty. Nominations were graded by an established rubric and overseen by professional controllers. In practice, points allocated on subjective criteria and those awarded for familial ties to earlier administrators entrenched a hereditary ruling class.

The civil service developed further with the imperial examination founded under the Sui. The imperial exam based on merit was designed under the Wen Emperor to select the best administrative officials for the state's bureaucracy. Despite the resumption of recommended candidates under the Yang Emperor, this system had a huge influence on both society and culture in Imperial China and was directly responsible for the creation of a class of scholar-bureaucrats who notionally held high rank for their personal merit regardless of their family pedigree. The succeeding Tang dynasty—particularly during the interregnum of the empress Wu Zetian's Zhou dynasty—expanded the exams' format and their importance. The system reached its apogee during the Song dynasty.

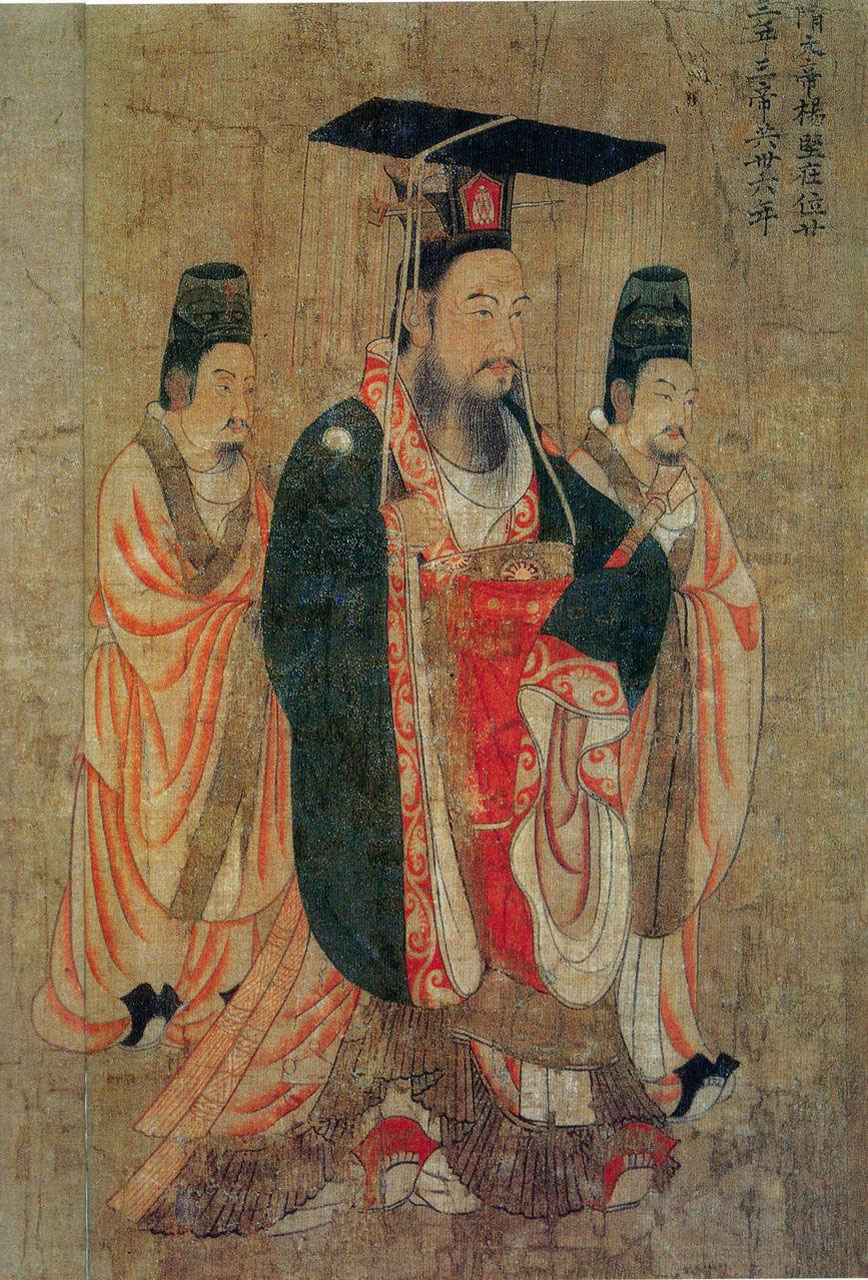
Emperor Wen of Sui (r. 581–604), who established the first civil service examination system in China; a painting by the chancellor and artist Yan Liben (600–673).

In theory, the Chinese civil service system provided one of the main avenues for social mobility in Chinese society, although, in practice, due to the time-consuming nature of the study, the examination was generally only taken by sons of the landed gentry. The examination tested each candidate's memorization of the Nine Classics of Confucianism, his ability to compose poetry using fixed and traditional forms, and his calligraphy. It was ideally suited to literary candidates. Thus, toward the end of the Ming Dynasty, the system attracted the candidature of Tang Xianzu (1550–1616). Tang at 14 passed the imperial examination at the county level; and at 21, he did so at the provincial level; but not until he was 34 did he pass at the national level. However, he had already become a well-known poet at age 12, and among other things he went on to such distinction as a profound literati and dramatist that it would not be far-fetched to regard him as China's answer to William Shakespeare.

=== Roman Empire ===
The Roman empire (27 BC – AD 395) had several types of civil servants who fulfilled diverse functions in Roman society. They were called apparitores.

==== Accensi ====
Accensi were usually professional civil servants, providing assistance to the elected magistrates during their term in office. In the courts, they summoned witnesses, kept track of time, and helped keep order. Outside of the courts, they escorted the magistrate and acted as heralds. They also helped in writing edicts and laws. It is also possible they were messengers and orderlies. The Accensi Velati were non military participants of military campaigns. They probably assisted clerks, accountants, supply officials, and aides. They also assisted religious affairs especially the Feriae Latinae, formed a collegium dedicated to managing the streets, and had a centuriate assembly dedicated to them.

===== Carnifex =====
The carnifex punished slaves and foreigners, unlike lictores who punished Romans.

===== Coactor =====
They were the tax collectors. The name coactor is derived from its latin meaning: "to compel, to force".

==== Lictores ====
Similarly to accensi, lictores were public officers tasked to assist magistrates since the times of the Roman kingdom (753 BC – 509 BC) or even earlier Etruscan times. The number of lictores a magistrate had was proportional to status. Lictores were in charge of punishing Roman citizens.

==== Praecones ====
They were generally employed to make announcements in public and crowds.

===== Scriba =====
The scriba were civil servants working as public notaries as well as general bureaucracy. Greek cities had a similar figure, however the job was done by slaves.

=== Modern civil service ===
In the 18th century, in response to economic changes and the growth of the British Empire, the bureaucracy of institutions such as the Office of Works and the Navy Board greatly expanded. Each had its own system, but in general, staff were appointed through patronage or outright purchase. By the 19th century, it became increasingly clear that these arrangements were falling short. "The origins of the British civil service are better known. During the eighteenth century a number of Englishmen wrote in praise of the Chinese examination system, some of them going so far as to urge the adoption for England of something similar. The first concrete step in this direction was taken by the British East India Company in 1806." In that year, the Honourable East India Company established a college, the East India Company College, near London to train and examine administrators of the company's territories in India. "The proposal for establishing this college came, significantly, from members of the East India Company's trading post in Canton, China." Examinations for the Indian "civil service"—a term coined by the Company—were introduced in 1829.

British efforts at reform were influenced by the imperial examinations system and meritocratic system of China. Thomas Taylor Meadows, Britain's consul in Guangzhou, China argued in his Desultory Notes on the Government and People of China, published in 1847, that "the long duration of the Chinese empire is solely and altogether owing to the good government which consists in the advancement of men of talent and merit only", and that the British must reform their civil service by making the institution meritocratic. On the other hand, John Browne, in the 1854 debate mentioned above, 'argued that elegant writing had become an end in itself, and the stultifying effect of this on the Chinese civil service had contributed in no small measure to China's failure to develop its early lead over Western civilisations': Coolican, p. 107.

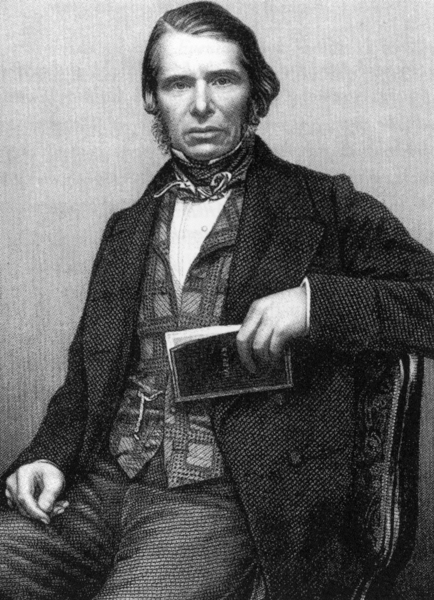
Charles Trevelyan, an architect of Her Majesty's Civil Service, established in 1855 on his recommendations.

In 1853 the Chancellor of the Exchequer William Gladstone, commissioned Sir Stafford Northcote and Charles Trevelyan to look into the operation and organisation of the Civil Service. Influenced by the Chinese imperial examinations, the Northcote–Trevelyan Report of 1854 made four principal recommendations: that recruitment should be on the basis of merit determined through competitive examination, that candidates should have a solid general education to enable inter-departmental transfers, that recruits should be graded into a hierarchy and that promotion should be through achievement, rather than "preferment, patronage or purchase". It also recommended a clear division between staff responsible for routine ("mechanical") work, and those engaged in policy formulation and implementation in an "administrative" class.

The report was well-timed, because bureaucratic chaos during the Crimean War was causing a clamour for the change. The report's conclusions were immediately implemented, and a permanent, unified and politically neutral civil service was introduced as Her Majesty's Civil Service. A Civil Service Commission was also set up in 1855 to oversee open recruitment and end patronage, and most of the other Northcote–Trevelyan recommendations were implemented over some years.

The same model, the Imperial Civil Service, was implemented in British India from 1858, after the demise of the East India Company's rule in India through the Indian Rebellion of 1857 which came close to toppling British rule in the country.

The Northcote–Trevelyan model remained essentially stable for a hundred years. This was a tribute to its success in removing corruption, delivering public services (even under the stress of two world wars), and responding effectively to political change. It also had a great international influence and was adapted by members of the Commonwealth. The Pendleton Civil Service Reform Act established a modern civil service in the United States, and by the turn of the 20th century almost all Western governments had implemented similar reforms.

== Independence and accountability ==
Autocratic systems of government (such as monarchies) can favour appointments to administrative positions on the basis of nepotism, patronage and favoritism, with close relationships between political and administrative figures. Early Roman emperors, for example, set their household slaves and freedmen much of the task of administering the Empire, sidelining the elected officials who continued the traditions of the Roman Republic. But the political appointment of bureaucrats can run the risk of tolerating inefficiency and corruption, with officials feeling secure in the protection of their political masters and possibly immune from prosecution for bribe-taking. Song-dynasty China (960–1279) standardised competitive examinations as a basis for civil-service recruitment and promotion, and in the 19th century administrations in France and Britain followed suit. Agitation against the spoils system in the United States resulted in increasing the independence of the civil service—seen as an important principle in modern times.

Some governmental structures include a civil service commission (or equivalent) whose functions include maintaining the work and rights of civil servants at arm's length from potential politicisation or political interference. Compare the governance-administrative integration of Stalin's Orgburo.

== By country ==
=== Africa ===
==== South Africa ====
In South Africa, the term public service is used in legislation and official government administration to describe what is in some other countries called the civil service. Section 197 of the Constitution of South Africa establishes a public service for the country, while the Public Service Act, 1994 provides for its organization and administration.

Under the Act, the public service comprises national and provincial government departments and government components. It does not include local government or public enterprises, which are instead part of the broader public sector. The Constitution requires the public service to execute government policies, and establishes principles for public administration, including professional ethics, accountability, and the efficient use of resources.

Municipal (local government) employees are not referred to as public servants, despite their being public employees, as they form part of a different administrative system and employment framework. Those working at the local government level are referred to as local government employees or municipal employees.

=== Americas ===
==== Brazil ====
Brazil started to move away from a patronage based public service starting in the second half of the 19th century, but written tests and merit only became the norm towards the end of the 1930s, as a result from reforms introduced during Getúlio Vargas first term as the nation's President.

Civil servants in Brazil (Portuguese: servidores públicos) are those working in the executive, legislative, and judicial branches of the Federal, state, Federal District or municipal governments, including congressmen, senators, mayors, ministers, the president of the republic, and workers in government-owned corporations.

Career civil servants (not temporary workers or politicians) are hired only externally on the basis of entrance examinations (Portuguese: concurso público). It usually consists of a written test; some posts may require physical tests (such as policemen), or oral tests (such as professors, judges, prosecutors and attorneys). The rank according to the examination score is used for filling the vacancies.

Entrance examinations are conducted by several institutions with a government mandate, such as CESPE (which belongs to the University of Brasília) and the Cesgranrio Foundation (which is part of the Federal University of Rio de Janeiro).

The labor laws and social insurance for civil servants are different from private workers; even between government branches (like different states or cities), the law and insurance differ.

The posts usually are ranked by titles, the most common are technician for high school literates and analyst for undergraduates. There's also higher post ranks like auditor, fiscal, chief of police, prosecutor, judge, attorney, etc.

The law does not allow servants to upgrade or downgrade posts internally; they need to be selected in separate external entrance examinations.

==== Canada ====
Historians have explored the powerful role of civil service since the 1840s.

In Canada, the civil service at the federal level is known as the Public Service of Canada, with each of the ten provincial governments as well as the three territorial governments also having their own separate civil services. The federal civil service consists of all employees of the crown. Ministers' exempt staff and members of the Royal Canadian Mounted Police or Canadian Armed Forces are not civil servants. There are approximately 357,000 federal civil servants (2023), and more than 350,000 employees at the provincial and territorial levels.

==== United States ====
In the United States, the federal civil service was established in 1871. The Civil Service is defined as "all appointive positions in the executive, judicial, and legislative branches of the Government of the United States, except positions in the uniformed services." (5 U.S.C. § 2101). In the early 19th century, government jobs were held at the pleasure of the president—a person could be fired at any time. The spoils system meant that jobs were used to support the political parties. This was changed in slow stages by the Pendleton Civil Service Reform Act of 1883 and subsequent laws. By 1909, almost two-thirds of the U.S. federal work force was appointed based on merit, that is, qualifications measured by tests. Certain senior civil service positions, including some heads of diplomatic missions and executive agencies, are filled by political appointees. Under the Hatch Act of 1939, civil servants are not allowed to engage in political activities while performing their duties.

The U.S. civil service includes the competitive service and the excepted service. The majority of civil service appointments in the U.S. are made under the competitive service, but the Foreign Service, the FBI, and other National Security positions are made under the excepted service. (U.S. Code Title V)

As of January 2007, the federal government, excluding the Postal Service, employed about 1.8 million civilian workers. The federal government is the nation's single largest employer, although it employs only about 12% of all government employees, compared to 24% at the state level and 63% at the local level. Although most federal agencies are based in the Washington, D.C. region, only about 16% (or about 284,000) of the federal government workforce is employed in this region. As of 2014, there are currently 15 federal executive branch agencies and hundreds of subagencies.

In the early 20th century, most cities in the US had a spoils system. Over the next few decades, the spoils system was replaced with a civil service system. U.S. state and local government entities often have competitive civil service systems that are modeled on the national system, in varying degrees.

=== Asia ===
==== Brunei ====
The Civil Service (Malay: Perkhidmatan Awam) of Brunei. The role of the civil service is as the government's administrative machinery to uphold the supreme authority of His Majesty the Sultan and Yang Di-Pertuan of Brunei Darussalam, uphold the National Philosophy – MIB, Melayu Islam Beraja, ensure the development of the country and ensure the welfare of the people as well as its traditional role as the peacekeeper, law enforcer, regulator and service providers. However, the adjudication system is separate from the civil service to maintain its independence and impartiality.

==== Cambodia ====
The Civil Service (Khmer: សេវាកម្មស៊ីវិល, Sevakamm Civil) of Cambodia is the policy implementing arm of the Royal Government of Cambodia. In executing this important role, each civil servant (Khmer: មន្រ្តីរាជការ, Montrey Reachkar) is obligated to act according to the law and is guided by public policy pronouncements. The Common Statute of Civil Servants is the primary legislative framework for the Civil Service in Cambodia.

==== China ====
===== Historical =====
One of the oldest examples of a civil service based on meritocracy is the Imperial bureaucracy of China, which can be traced as far back as the Qin dynasty (221–207 BC). However, the civil service examinations were practiced on a much smaller scale in comparison to the stronger, centralized bureaucracy of the Song dynasty (960–1279). In response to the regional military rule of jiedushi and the loss of civil authority during the late Tang period and Five Dynasties (907–960), the Song emperors were eager to implement a system where civil officials would owe their social prestige to the central court and gain their salaries strictly from the central government. This ideal was not fully achieved since many scholar officials were affluent landowners and were engaged in many anonymous business affairs in an age of economic revolution in China. Nonetheless, gaining a degree through three levels of examination—prefectural exams, provincial exams, and the prestigious palace exams—was a far more desirable goal in society than becoming a merchant. This was because the mercantile class was traditionally regarded with some disdain by the scholar-official class.

This class of state bureaucrats in the Song period were far less aristocratic than their Tang predecessors. The examinations were carefully structured in order to ensure that people of lesser means than what was available to candidates born into wealthy, landowning families were given a greater chance to pass the exams and obtain an official degree. This included the employment of a bureau of copyists who would rewrite all of the candidates' exams in order to mask their handwriting and thus prevent favoritism by graders of the exams who might otherwise recognize a candidate's handwriting. The advent of widespread printing in the Song period allowed many more examination candidates access to the Confucian texts whose mastery was required for passing the exams.

===== Current =====
Hong Kong and Macau have separate civil service systems:

- Hong Kong Civil Service
- Secretariat for Administration and Justice is responsible for the civil service in Macau

==== India ====
In India, civil servants are selected as per the Constitution of India. Civil servants serve at the pleasure of the President of India. The civil services of India can be classified into two types—the All India Services and the Central Civil Services (Group A and B). The recruits are university graduates selected through three phase exams such as the Civil Services Examination (CSE) or the Engineering Services Examination (ESE) among others, conducted by the Union Public Service Commission (UPSC). Additionally, there are also State Civil Services. The state civil servants are selected through an examination conducted by state public service commissions. State civil servants serve at the pleasure of the Governor.

==== Indonesia ====
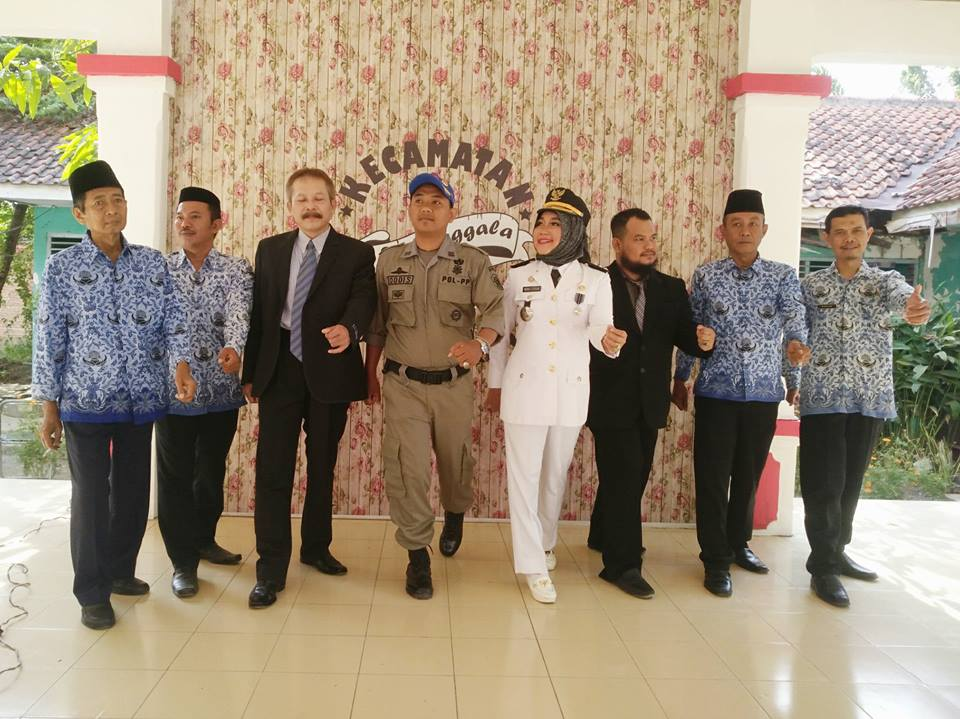
Civil Service in Suranenggala, Cirebon, West Java, Indonesia

In Indonesia, Civil Service (Indonesian: Pegawai negeri sipil di Indonesia) is a component of the State Civil Apparatus (Indonesian: Aparatur Sipil Negara). Since the enactment of Law Number 5 of 2014, ASN employees have been divided into two categories: PNS, who are appointed as permanent employees, and Government Employees with Work Agreements (Indonesian: Pegawai Pemerintah dengan Perjanjian Kerja), who are appointed according to the needs of government agencies.

As of June 30, 2021, the number of civil service in Indonesia was 4,081,824, consisting of 2,143,065 women (53%) and 1,938,759 men (47%). Seventy-seven percent of them work in regional government agencies, while the remaining 23% work in central government agencies. Approximately 11% hold structural positions, 51% hold functional positions, and 38% hold executive positions. The number of civil service in Indonesia has continued to decline since 2016

==== Pakistan ====
In Pakistan the FPSC (Federal Public Service Commission) conducts a competitive examination for the Central Superior Services of Pakistan and other civil-service posts; Pakistan inherited this system from the British Raj-era Indian Civil Service.

Pakistan has federal civil servants serving in federal government offices, with staff selected through the Federal Public Service Commission. Similarly, Pakistani provinces select their own public servants through provincial Public Service Commissions. The federal services have some quota against provincial posts, while provincial services have some quota in federal services.

==== Taiwan ====
The ROC constitution specifies that public servant cannot be employed without examination. The employment is usually lifelong (that is, until age about retirement).

=== Europe ===
==== France ====
The civil service in France (fonction publique) is often incorrectly considered to include all government employees including employees of public corporations, such as SNCF.

Public sector employment is classified into three services; State service, Local service and Hospital service. According to government statistics there were 5.5 million public sector employees in 2011.

Category	Central Government	Local Government	Health service	Total
Education	1,360.6			1,360.6
Police	284.4	40		324.4
Defence	280.7			280.7
Health & Social		241	1,153	1,394.0
Other	516.1	1,631		2,147.1
Total	2,441.8	1,912	1,153	5,506.8
% Civil servants	62%	75%	72%	-

==== Germany ====
The Public Service in Germany (Öffentlicher Dienst) employed 4.6 million persons as of 2011. Public servants are organized into hired salaried employees (Arbeitnehmer), appointed civil servants (Beamte), judges, and soldiers. They are employed by public bodies (Körperschaften des öffentlichen Rechts), such as counties (Kreise), states, the federal government, etc. In addition to employees directly employed by the state another 1.6 million persons are employed by state owned enterprises

Category	Federal Government	Regional Government	Municipal Government	Social Security	Total
State employees	458	2,114.4	1,220.7	378.6	4,171.7
government owned enterprises	240.4	387.1	950.2	24.5	1,602.1
Total	698.4	2,501.5	2,170.9	403.1	5,733.8

Beamte has been a title for government employees for several centuries in German states, but became a standardized group in 1794. Soldiers other than conscripted soldiers are not Beamte but have similar rights. Judges are not Beamte but have similar rights too. Public attorneys are all Beamte, whereas most (but not all) professors are Beamte. The group of Beamte have the most secure employment, and the amount they are paid is set by national pay regulations (Besoldungsordnungen). Beamte are prohibited from striking.

Arbeitnehmer have work contracts, whereas Beamte are appointed, employed, and removed in accordance with the Public Sector Service and Loyalty law (öffentlich-rechtliches Dienst- und Treueverhältnis). Most tasks can be either done by Arbeitnehmer or Beamte, however some specific tasks of official nature are supposed to be handled by Beamte since they are subject to a special loyalty obligation.

Beamte are divided into four levels:

- Einfacher Dienst: ordinary civil service, corresponding to enlisted ranks in the military, now largely obsolete
- Mittlerer Dienst: medium-level civil service, corresponding to non-commissioned officers in the military
- Gehobener Dienst: senior civil service, including civil servant positions such as Inspektor and above, corresponding to commissioned officers from lieutenant to captain in the military
- Höherer Dienst: higher civil service, including civil servant positions such as Rat (Councillor) and above as well as academic employees such as Professors, corresponding to major and above in the military

Gehobener Dienst and Höherer Dienst both require a university education or equivalent, at the very least a bachelor's or master's degree, respectively.

==== Ireland ====
The civil service of Ireland includes the employees of the Departments of State (excluded are government ministers and a small number of paid political advisors) as well as a small number of core state agencies such as the Office of the Revenue Commissioners, the Office of Public Works, and the Public Appointments Service. The organisation of the Irish Civil Service is very similar to the traditional organization of the British Home Civil Service, and indeed the grading system in the Irish Civil Service is nearly identical to the traditional grading system of its British counterpart. In Ireland, public sector employees such as teachers or members of the country's police force, the Garda Síochána are not considered to be civil servants, but are rather described as "public servants" (and form the public service of the Republic of Ireland).

==== Spain ====
The civil service in Spain (función pública) is usually considered to include all the employees at the different levels of government: central government, autonomous communities, as well as municipalities. There are three main categories of Spanish public positions: temporary political posts ("personal eventual"), which require a simple procedure for hiring and dismissal and is associated to top level executives and advisors, statutory permanent posts ("funcionarios de carrera"), which require a formal procedure for access that usually involves a competition among candidates and whose tenants are subject to a special statutory relationship of work with their employers, and non statutory permanent posts ("personal laboral"), which also require a formal procedure for entry similar to the procedure required for the "funcionarios de carrera", but whose tenants are subject to normal working conditions and laws. Competitions differ notably among the state, the 17 autonomous communities and the city councils, and the "funcionarios de carrera" and "personal laboral" examinations vary in difficulty from one location to another.

As of 2013, there were 2.6 million public employees in Spain, of which 571,000 were civil servants and 2 million were non-civil servants.

Category	Employee type	Central Government	Regional Government	Municipal	University	Total
Police	Civil servants	147	25			172
Defence	Civil servants	124				124
Health & Social	Civil servants		321			321
	other public employees		170			170
Other	Civil servants	180	562	218	74	1034
	other public employees	119	229	330	75	753
Total	Civil servants	451	908	218	74	1651
	other public employees	119	399	330	75	923
	Total	570	1307	548	149	2574

More recent figures can be found at SEAT.

In December 2011, the government of Rajoy announced that civil servants have to serve a minimum 37.5 working hours per week regardless of their place or kind of service.

==== Switzerland ====
Civil servants in Switzerland work for the Confederation, cantons, or communes. According to the OECD, approximately 595,000 people worked for a public administration in 2022, representing 11.2% of the active population, placing Switzerland in the lower third among OECD member countries. However, some estimates place the figure at 23% when including employees of semi-public entities such as the Post, the Federal Railways, university hospitals, and subsidized sectors. The Swiss public service is characterized by extreme fragmentation, with the Confederation, 26 cantons, and approximately 3,000 communes each maintaining their own personnel regulations.

Historically, Swiss civil servants were appointed for fixed terms and often renewed by tacit re-election, a system rooted in republican traditions hostile to career civil service derived from royal courts. Only the cantons of Geneva and Vaud practiced lifelong civil service appointments similar to most European countries. Toward the end of the 20th century, most cantons shifted to engaging personnel under regular employment contracts with indefinite duration. By 2000, the majority of cantons and numerous municipalities had transitioned from a traditional civil service system to an administration composed of regular employees. The Confederation followed with its Federal Personnel Act, which entered into force in 2002, abolishing the fixed-term appointment system and introducing collective bargaining agreements in public services.

The median monthly salary in the public sector is 8,094 Swiss francs, compared to 6,510 francs in the private sector, a difference partly explained by higher qualification levels and older age profiles in public employment. Trade unions in the public sector are characterized by strong dispersion across branches, fields of activity, and ideological orientations. The Swiss Union of Public Service Personnel (SSP/VPOD), created in 1905, operates primarily at cantonal and communal levels, while federal-level unions were historically represented by the Federative Association of Public Administration and Enterprise Personnel (founded 1903), replaced in 2003 by the Federal Staff Negotiating Community. Strikes have been historically rare, and civil servants of the Confederation and most cantons were long forbidden to strike.

==== United Kingdom ====
The civil service in the United Kingdom only includes Crown (i.e. central government) employees, not parliamentary employees or local government employees. Public sector employees such as those in education and the NHS are not considered to be civil servants. Police officers and staff are also not civil servants. Total employment in the public sector in the UK was 6.04 million in 2012 according to the UK's Office for National Statistics.

Category	Central government	Local government	Health service	Total
Police		278,000		278,000
Defence	193,000			193,000
Health & Social		364,000	1,565,000	1,929,000
Other	1,989,000	42,000		2,031,000
Total	2,182,000	2,290,000	1,565,000	6,037,000

Civil servants in the devolved government in Northern Ireland are not part of the Home Civil Service, but constitute the separate Northern Ireland Civil Service. Some employees of the Foreign and Commonwealth Office are members of HM Diplomatic Service, which is associated with but separate from the Civil Service.

==== European Union ====
The European Civil Service administers the institutions of the European Union, of which the largest employer is the European Commission.

Civil servants are recruited directly into the institutions after being selected by competitions set by EPSO, the official selection office. They are allocated to departments, known as Directorates-General (DGs), each covering one or more related policy areas.

== See also ==
=== General ===
- Civic technology
- Civil service commission
- Civil service examination
- Civil service organisation
- Community service
- Public service

=== By continent or region ===
- Civil service reform in developing countries e.g. Nigeria, Congo, etc.

==== Africa ====
- Nigerian Civil Service
  - Civil Service Commission of Nigeria
  - Rivers State Civil Service
- Civil Service Commission (Somaliland)

==== Asia ====
- Civil Service of the People's Republic of China
  - Civil Service of Hong Kong
- Bangladesh Civil Service
- Civil Services of India
  - Civil Service in early India
  - Civil Services of Tamil Nadu
- Civil service of Japan
- Civil service in Malaysia
- Civil Services of Pakistan
- Civil Service Commission (Philippines)
- Civil Service of Singapore

==== Europe ====
- Civil Service of the European Union
- Civil Service of Germany
- Civil Service of the Republic of Ireland
- Civil Service of the United Kingdom
  - Civil Service Commission
  - Civil Service Commission (Isle of Man)
- Civil Service Restoration Act

==== North America ====
- Public Service of Canada
  - Minister responsible (Manitoba)
- Civil service in the United States
  - Civil Service Commission
- Civil service reform
- Civil service reform act
- Civil Service Reform Act of 1978

==== Oceania ====
- Australian Public Service
- New Zealand Public Service Departments

==== South America ====
- Civil service in Brazil

=== Pay and benefits ===
- Performance-related pay
- Pay-for-Performance (Federal Government)
  - Pay for performance (healthcare)
  - Pay to play
- Incentive program

==== United States ====
- Civil Service Retirement System
- Merit pay (Federal Government Merit Pay)
- Pay-for-Performance (Federal Government)
- Pay for performance (human resources)
- 2014 Veterans Health Administration scandal
