= Pay for performance =

Pay for performance may refer to:

- Pay for performance (human resources), a system of employee payment in the United States that links compensation to measures of work quality or goals
- Pay for performance (healthcare), an emerging movement in health insurance in Britain and the United States, in which providers are rewarded for quality of healthcare system
- Pay-for-Performance (Federal Government), proposed and implemented systems of incentive pay based on job performance metrics. See also "Federal Government Merit Pay" section in merit pay
- Pay for play, money is exchanged for services

== See also ==
- Compensation of employees
- Incentive program
- Merit pay
- Performance-related pay
