= Pay-for-Performance (Federal Government) =

Method of employee motivation used by U.S. government

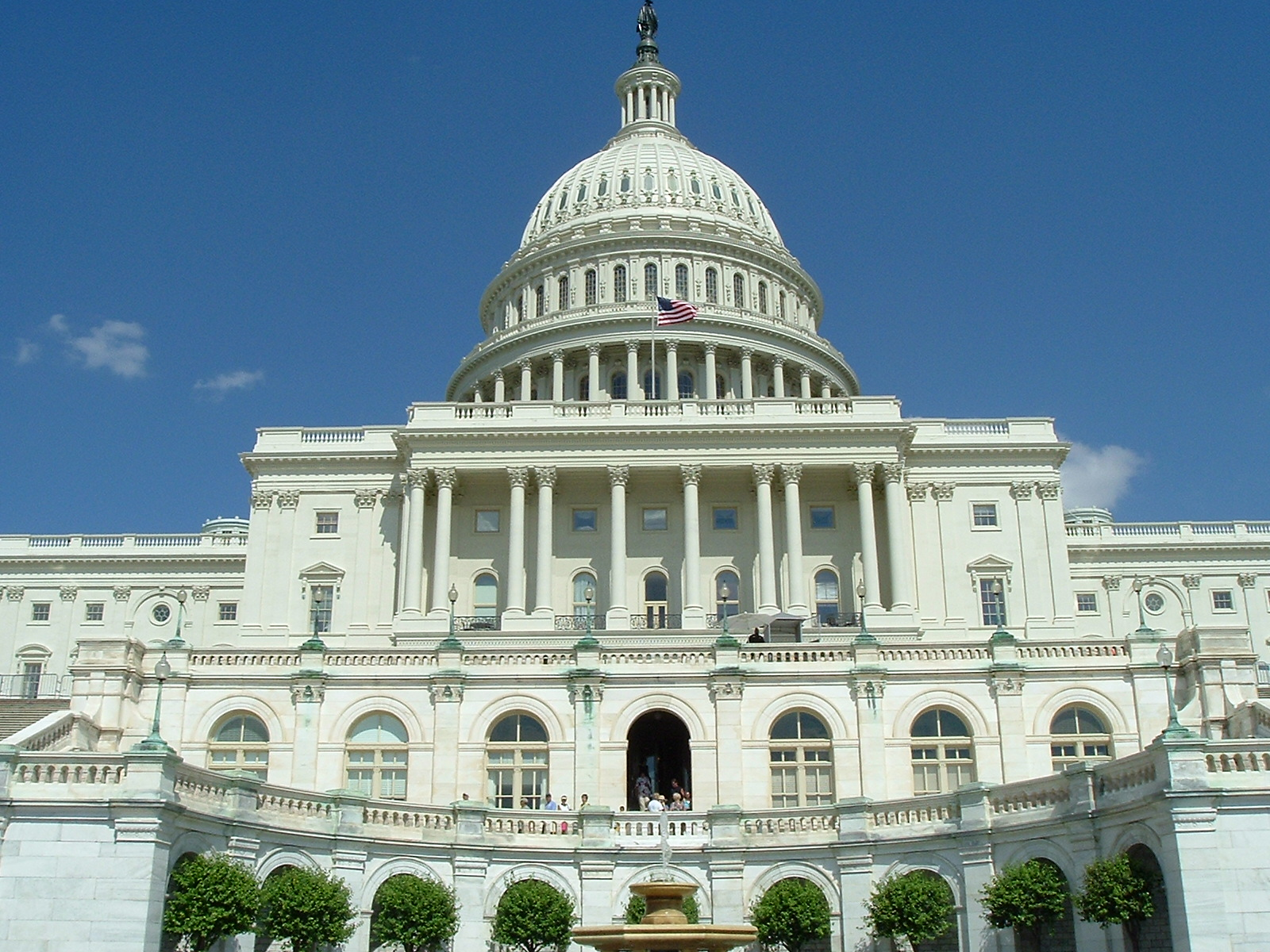
U.S. Capital Building in Washington, D.C.

Pay-for-Performance is a method of employee motivation meant to improve performance in the United States federal government by offering incentives such as salary increases, bonuses, and benefits. It is a similar concept to Merit Pay for public teachers and it follows basic models from Performance-related Pay in the private sector. According to recent studies, however, there are key differences in how pay-for-performance models influence federal employees in public service roles. James Perry is one scholar who has conducted such studies. His research reveals that public servants tend to be more intrinsically motivated, and thus, are prone to have a negative reaction to monetary incentives. There is still debate, however, on what exactly makes the public sector different.

== History ==
Pay-for-performance programs first began in the private sector. As consultants, academic experts, and employee advocate groups analyzed merit pay systems' success in private businesses, they recommended expanding this method into the public sector. One vital omission in the process of implementation, however, is that the policy makers failed to consider that the stakeholders in the private sector differ from those in the public sector.

The first trial run of a pay-for-performance system came in the late 1970s. In 1978, U.S. President Jimmy Carter introduced the broad outlines of the Civil Service Reform Act in his State of the Union message. It was the first time a U.S. president had ever included civil service reform among his major legislative proposals.

The Civil Service Reform Act of 1978 created the Office of Personnel Management, to oversee the human resource management of the federal government, and the Merit Systems Protection Board, to regulate the merit system and prevent any abuse. The major provisions in the act included, but were not limited to, performance appraisals for all employees, merit pay on a variety of levels (but focusing on managerial levels), and modifications for dealing with poor performers. This merit pay system was a break in the long tradition of automatic salary increases based on length of service. Under the new act, employees only got half of their traditional automatic salary increase. The remaining non-automatic portion was divided up according to performance rating. A key part of this system was that it was revenue neutral—this meant that when some employees benefited under the new system, others would of necessity be receive less than in the previous system.

The greatest benefits of the Act were that it clarified job expectations and defined goals and objectives. The clearest shortcoming was that it failed to establish a "demonstrable relationship between pay and performance." This failure had a number of causes—most notably a lack of adequate funding. Managers who performed satisfactorily often found themselves receiving less pay than their non-managerial counterparts because the non-managerial employees were still under the previous pay system. Some complained that this merit system seemed arbitrary and many employees did not perceive it as a fair assessment of performance and effort. Furthermore, the public became upset when they saw certain senior executives in the government receiving large paychecks. It became apparent that the Act was not an effective means of civic service reform.

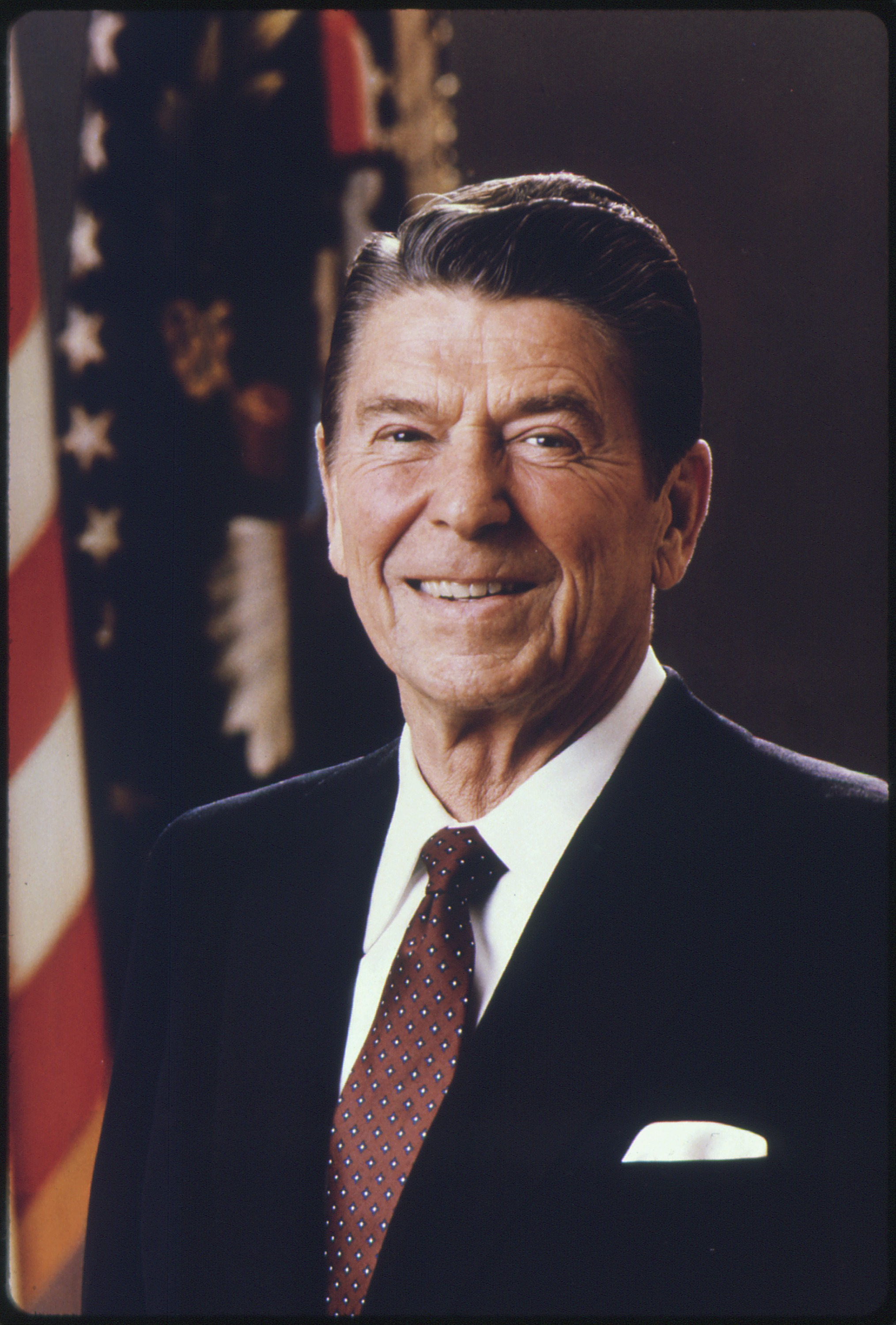
President Ronald Reagan

When Ronald Reagan was elected in 1982, he significantly reduced the size and cost of many portions of government, thereby greatly limiting the Civil Service Reform Act. Satisfying the need for new legislation, the Performance Management and Recognition System (PMRS) was enacted on November 8, 1984. Most notably, the PMRS provided a greater level of evaluation accuracy and imposed minimum and maximum levels of pay increase to limit disparity among merit pay employees. PMRS also created Performance Standard Review Boards for each department and required that at least half of the board be members who were under the merit pay system. This requirement ensured that at least some board members had a vested interest in dealing with potential problems and concerns.

Although it was considered a significant improvement over its predecessor, PMRS only lasted from 1984 to 1991. The demise of PMRS was caused by poor discrimination among performance levels, inadequate performance findings, and little demonstrable evidence that the system improved performance. Over 50 percent of the employees felt like the size of the rewards was inadequate, and more than 75 percent of the managers stated that their performance evaluations provided little guidance for development purposes, mentioning that "insufficient funds [had] resulted in meaningless performance awards."

Since the PMRS was abandoned, various proposals have surfaced and even a few agencies have tried variations of pay-for-performance systems. The Department of Defense and the Department of Homeland Security have both developed systems, but they were annulled when President Barack Obama signed the National Defense Authorization Act on October 28, 2009. There has yet to be a new pay-for-performance system implemented on a nationwide scale for the United States Federal Government.

== Research ==
When these federal pay for performance systems failed, many were surprised because it had worked so well within the private sector. Much of this failure was attributed to the fact that most of the research on pay for performance had been done in the private rather than public sector. These perplexing and inconsistent results between the private and public sectors led academia to question why pay-for-performance programs in the public sector were not as effective. Research revealed that two main factors contributed to poor public sector motivation and performance: (1) the public sector has unique budgeting restrictions that make it difficult to effectively implement such a program, and (2) the type of motivation that affects employees in the federal public sector is different from the motivators that work for employees of private business firms.

=== Unique characteristics of the public sector ===
A limited and restricted budget is one of the biggest factors that have prevented the public sector from successfully implementing a pay for performance program. As noted by Antoinette Weibel, the private sector simply has more money and will always be more fluid with cash than any public sector organization. Profit motive will always matter in the private sector because a business organization's function is to maximize profits.

Since public organizations operate on tax revenue, they are expected to act responsibly for that stewardship of resources. Public institutions also operate in nonmarket conditions and are subject to unique rules and expectations. This makes budgeting for incentives very difficult because unlike private sector businesses, public organizations cannot arrange their incentives around the company profit. By their very nature of receiving funds instead of generating them, public organizations can never have the same freedom that private organizations have in providing incentives in the work force.

As important as the budget differences are to the issue of pay for performance, the difference in how federal and private sector employees respond to motivators is even more crucial. Weibel has demonstrated that public servants tend to gravitate more to intrinsic motivation, but two key researchers, Edward L. Deci and Robert Eisenburger, have disagreed as to whether extrinsic motivation is harmful to intrinsically motivated individuals. Deci designed a study that involved college students who were given an "interesting" activity to perform. Some of those students were provided tangible rewards (e.g. money) as an extrinsic motivation and were observed by researchers to see how they reacted. From these studies, Deci argued that some activities provide their own inherent reward, so motivation for such activities is not dependent on external rewards. Deci goes even further to show that when extrinsic rewards are placed on these activities, it is detrimental to performance because it puts a market price on something they already value internally.

Eisenberger designed a study meant to refute Deci's claim. His results reported that "perceived competence partially mediated the positive relationship found between performance-contingent reward and intrinsic motivation." In other words, the detrimental effects of providing tangible rewards, discussed in the Deci studies, occurred under highly restricted, easily avoidable conditions.

Although a push for providing extrinsic motivation is still politically popular, research continues to lean toward the understanding of Deci and Perry—that the public sector is fundamentally different from the private sector. Since those who work for government or non-profit organizations are more likely to be in the mindset of serving others, they tend to be motivated more intrinsically. They perform tasks because of loyalty or an internalized sense of duty, and/or enjoyment. Giving employees a performance-contingent monetary incentive to do something they already enjoy can decrease his/her motivation to do it as the person is then likely to view its action as externally driven rather than as internally appealing.

Weibel contributed further to Perry and Deci's findings when she and her team examined the benefits and costs of an extrinsically motivated system, and compared this system in the public and the private sectors. This clearly defined scope allowed the pay-for-performance policies in each sector to be evaluated individually. The authors’ hypothesis was that the public sector has specific characteristics (the same as those diagnosed by Deci and Perry) that would make pay for performance ineffective, calling the proposed adoption for such policies "naïve".

=== Recent developments ===
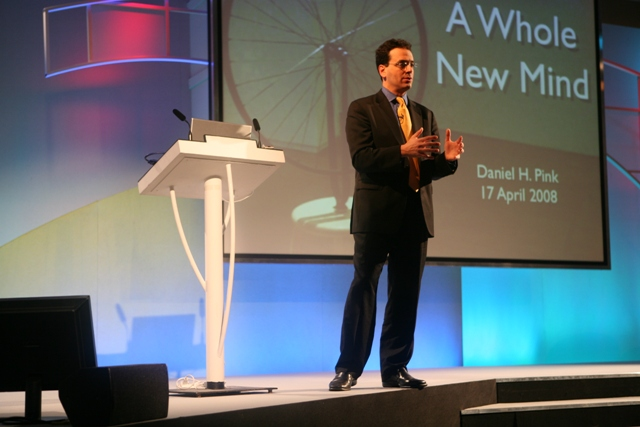
Daniel H. Pink in London

Research has continued to support the notion that although incentive systems may be effective and efficient in one organizational context, they can be ineffective or even counterproductive in others. Daniel Pink has been another persuasive voice who has drawn on many of these studies to call for new methods of motivation in the workplace. He cites an MIT study in which the research team repeatedly demonstrated that as long as the tasks being undertaken are purely mechanical, performance-related pay works to improve results. The moment a task required any cognitive skill, the incentives became detrimental to performance.

Others, such as Weibel, have also urged caution in implementing the pay-for-performance models of old. In the federal government, this is especially important because intrinsically motivated public service agents are shown to have a "higher incentive to invest in expert knowledge than extrinsically motivated ones and therefore function as the 'institutional memory' of public service."

To preserve that institutional memory and continue to attract intrinsically motivated employees, the government will likely need alternative models to replace or supplement the popular business model of performance-related pay. Some have suggested an incentive plan that focuses on employees' internal motivation. Instead of cash bonuses or raises, employees may instead be given discretionary time to work on creative projects in which they have a personal interest, as has been implemented by companies such as Google and 3M. Another alternative to a strictly intrinsically based model may be a hybrid in which monetary rewards and intrinsic incentives are offered, giving the employees of both dispositions the motivation to increase performance. It is unclear what the next step of action will be for the federal government, but since the issue of pay for performance is so politically popular it is unlikely that the issue will go away any time soon.

The President's Management Agenda (PMA) and Office of Budget and Management asked federal government agencies to maximize performance as well as reevaluate and restructure human capital. These agencies were also required to amend ineffective policies on performance management. The PMA recommended streamlining the system of compensating and rewarding federal employees. One way is to move from the present General Schedule approach to a system that emphasizes performance-based wages. In the US and many countries of Western Europe, pay for performance plans are used collectively. In Hong Kong, the popularity of pay for performance is increasing gradually both in the public and private sectors.

== See also ==
- Civil service
- Incentive program
- Merit pay (Note: The "Merit pay" article includes coverage of both "Teacher merit pay" and "Federal Government Merit Pay," which overlaps this article)
- Pay for performance, which includes:
  - Pay for performance (healthcare)—an emerging movement in health insurance in Britain and the United States, in which providers are rewarded for quality of healthcare services
  - Pay for performance (human resources)—a system of employee payment in the United States that links compensation to measures of work quality or goals
  - Pay for play, money is exchanged for services
- Performance-related pay
- Veterans Health Administration scandal of 2014
