= Veterans' Access to Care through Choice, Accountability, and Transparency Act of 2014 =

United States military Veterans Choice Act

- Long title: To improve the access of veterans to medical services from the Department of Veterans Affairs, and for other purposes.
- Announced in: the 113th United States Congress
- Sponsored by: Rep. Hal Rogers (R-KY)

Citations
- Public law: Pub. L. 113–146 (text) (PDF)

Legislative history
- Introduced in the House as H.R. 3230 by Rep. Hal Rogers (R-KY) on October 2, 2013; Committee consideration by United States House Committee on Appropriations; Passed the House on October 3, 2013 (Roll Call Vote 516: 265-160); Passed the Senate on June 11, 2014 (Roll Call Vote 187: 93-3); Signed into law by President Barack Obama on August 7, 2014

The Veterans' Access to Care through Choice, Accountability, and Transparency Act of 2014 (H.R. 3230; Pub. L. 113–146 (text) (PDF)), also known as the Veterans Choice Act, is a United States public law that is intended to address the ongoing Veterans Health Administration scandal of 2014. The law expanded the number of options veterans have for receiving care and granted the United States Secretary of Veterans Affairs more power to fire senior executives. The Veterans Health Administration scandal of 2014 began with the discovery that there was on-going systematic lying by the Veterans Health Administration about the wait times veterans experienced waiting to be seen by doctors. By June 5, 2014, Veterans Affairs internal investigations had identified a total of 35 veterans who had died while waiting for care in the Phoenix VHA system. Another audit determined that "more than 57,000 veterans waited at least 90 days to see a doctor, while another 63,000 over the last decade never received an initial appointment."

The bill was introduced into the United States House of Representatives during the 113th United States Congress under the name "Pay Our Guard and Reserve Act" as one of the October 2013 mini-continuing resolutions passed by the House during the United States federal government shutdown of 2013. President Obama signed it into law on August 7, 2014. The law includes access to healthcare at non-VA hospitals for rural veterans, as well as vast increases in staffing and facilities at existing VA medical centers.

== Background ==
CNN reported on April 27, 2014, that at least 40 United States Armed Forces veterans died while waiting for care at the Phoenix, Arizona, Veterans Health Administration facilities. By June 5, 2014, Veterans Affairs internal investigations had identified a total of 35 veterans who had died while waiting for care in the Phoenix VHA system. An investigation of delays in treatment throughout the Veterans Health Administration system is being conducted by the Veterans Affairs Office of the Inspector General, and the House has passed legislation to fund a $1 million criminal investigation by the Justice Department. On May 16, 2014, the Veterans Health Administration's top health official, Dr. Robert Petzel, retired early at the request of Secretary of Veterans Affairs Eric Shinseki. On May 30, 2014, Secretary Shinseki, himself, resigned from office amid the fallout from the controversy. As of early June 2014, several other VA medical centers around the nation have been identified with the same problems as the Phoenix facility, and the investigations by the VA Inspector General, the Congress and others are widening.

== Provisions of the bill ==
- The bill costs nearly $2 billion. Approximately $500 million would be used for hiring more doctors and nurses to work for the VA.
- Veterans who live over 40 miles away from the nearest VA health clinic or who are unable to get an appointment in a reasonable time frame would be able to receive "choice cards" allowing them to seek treatment from a non-VA facility. This would be a pilot program lasting for two years. Veterans would be allowed to go to other providers that accept Medicare, the military's health program TRICARE, or at facilities run by the United States Department of Defense.
- The Secretary of Veterans Affairs would have increased power to fire senior executives. The executives could be removed immediately from the payroll and would only have a week to appeal being fired. Three weeks later, a merit board would make a final decision in that person's case.
- The bill would authorize the VA to build 26 new facilities.
- The bill would require public colleges and universities to grant veterans in-state tuition.
- The bill would improve the medical care that victims of military sexual assault receive.
- The Act shifts the cost of the medical treatment and care to the veteran's private insurance plan and the Veterans Administration now requires joining the Choice program as a condition of receiving medical care, although this change has not been published. Congressman Jeff Miller's House Committee report anticipated a $200,000,000 recovery from veterans' private health plans, but with only 84,386 appointments made through the first six months of 2015, shifting the cost to the private sector has not been successful.

== Congressional Budget Office report ==
This summary is based largely on the summary provided by the Congressional Budget Office, as introduced in the Senate on June 10, 2014. This is a public domain source. Title III of S. 2450 was incorporated completely into H.R. 3230. This relationship was identified by the Congressional Research Service.

The Congressional Budget Office (CBO) has prepared a preliminary analysis of Title III of S. 2450, the Veterans' Access to Care through Choice, Accountability, and Transparency Act of 2014, as introduced in the Senate on June 10, 2014. That title would authorize and fund enhancements to several programs of the United States Department of Veterans Affairs (VA). In particular, VA would receive expansive authority for the next few years to contract with health care providers who are not employed by the VA, and VA would be required to use that authority to ensure that all eligible veterans would receive requested health care in a timely fashion. The effects of providing such broad new authority to VA are highly uncertain, and CBO has been able to make only a preliminary and partial assessment of the legislation. Based on that preliminary assessment, CBO estimates that enacting Title III of S. 2450 would increase direct spending by roughly $35 billion over the 2014-2024 period. CBO has not yet estimated the budgetary effects of the other titles of S. 2450.

VA currently has about 8.4 million veterans enrolled in its health care program. Of the remaining roughly 13 million living veterans, CBO estimates that about 8 million qualify to enroll in VA's health care program but have not enrolled. VA currently spends about $44 billion providing health care services to veterans, or about $5,200 per enrollee. (That amount does not include spending on programs that CBO expects would not be increased under this legislation, such as long-term care, caregivers, and ending veterans' homelessness.) Based on information from VA on veterans' reliance on VA, CBO estimates that this cost represents about 30 percent of the total amount of health care received by those veterans.

CBO estimates that, under Title III, enrolled veterans would ultimately seek to increase the amount of care they receive from VA by about 60 percent. In addition, CBO expects that some of the people who are eligible to enroll but not yet enrolled would choose to enroll because of the improvement in access to health care through VA. Most of the costs incurred to provide that care would be for care financed by other payers, including Medicare; a portion of those costs would thus be offset by savings to the Medicare program. All told, CBO expects that veterans would ultimately seek additional care that would cost the federal government about $50 billion a year, on net.

However, CBO expects that VA would have difficulty in quickly setting up a program to contract for health care nationwide and in establishing administrative processes to approve care by private health care providers. Moreover, the amount of care that veterans sought through VA might increase gradually over time. Thus, CBO expects that, of the amount of additional care sought by veterans, VA would provide only about 20 percent in 2015 and about 50 percent in 2016. VA would also spend a comparatively small amount in 2014 on administration and new hiring. Thus, CBO estimates that implementing title III would cost roughly $500 million in 2014, $10 billion in 2015, and $25 billion in 2016.

The magnitude of those budgetary effects is highly uncertain. A significant number of veterans could receive new and expanded health care benefits under S. 2450. How many would ultimately receive those benefits and the resulting costs will depend on a number of factors that are very difficult to predict. Further, the specific parameters of the new program would depend on regulations that would need to be developed. Because the behavioral changes that would result from enacting those provisions are so uncertain, this estimate should be viewed as falling in the middle of a wide range of possible outcomes.

== Procedural history ==
The bill H.R. 3230 was introduced into the United States House of Representatives on October 2, 2013, by Rep. Hal Rogers (R-KY) as the "Pay Our Guard and Reserve Act". The bill was referred to the United States House Committee on Appropriations. The bill was one of the October 2013 mini-continuing resolutions passed by the House during the United States federal government shutdown of 2013. On October 3, 2013, the House voted in Roll Call Vote 516 to pass the bill 265–160.

The Choice Act proposal was introduced to the late senator John McCain on April 18, 2014, by disabled veteran Ricky C. Barnes of Phoenix, Arizona https://www.24-7pressrelease.com/press-release/494376/ricky-c-barnes-has-been-inducted-into-the-prestigious-marquis-whos-who-biographical-registry. Mr. Barnes aspiration for non-VA care for all veterans began 1999 and was finally introduced to the United States House of Representatives in 2014. He was also instrumental in the uncovering of the 2014 Phoenix VA Scandal. On June 11, 2014, the United States Senate changed the name of the bill to the "Veterans' Access to Care through Choice, Accountability, and Transparency Act of 2014" and voted to pass the bill 93–3 in Roll Call Vote 187.

Chairman of the House Committee on Veterans Affairs Jeff Miller said that "many of the provisions included in today's Senate-passed bill are based on ideas that have already cleared the House, so I'm hopeful both chambers of Congress can soon agree on a final package to send to the president's desk." Miller was referring to the Veteran Access to Care Act of 2014 (H.R. 4810; 113th Congress) which contained similar provisions and passed the House on June 10, 2014.

The House and Senate established a conference committee to agree on amendments to the bill. The committee met on June 24, 2014. The House voted to agree to the conference report on July 30, 2014, with a vote of 420–5 in Roll Call Vote 467. The Senate voted to agree to the conference report on July 31, 2014, with a vote of 91–3 in Roll Call Vote 254. President Barack Obama signed the bill into law on August 7, 2014.

Senators John McCain (R-AZ) and Bernie Sanders (I-VT) were the two main senators who negotiated the bipartisan initiative. McCain said "is this a final solution to these problems? No, but it is a beginning." McCain also called the situation an "emergency" and said "if it's not an emergency that we've neglected these brave men and women who have protected our country, then I don't know what is."

Only three senators voted against the bill, Jeff Sessions (R-AL), Bob Corker (R-TN), and Ron Johnson (R-WI).

== Expansion of Eligibility ==
On April 19, 2017, President Donald Trump signed a bill into law extending the act and expanding the eligibility for the program, where veterans are given the option for a private doctor if their VA wait is only 20 days (28 for specialty care) or their drive is only 30 minutes.(Pub. L. 115–26 (text) (PDF), 131 Stat. 129). Throughout his presidency, Trump falsely claimed on at least 156 occasions that his administration was the first to pass the bill, despite the fact that it was passed by Obama in 2014 before he was president.

== Outcomes ==
Failures with the VA Choice program emerged in a 2017 whistleblower case concerning the Manchester VA Medical Center, in which one of the administrators of the VA Choice program, Health Net Federal Services, failed to schedule appointments for New Hampshire veterans, leaving some veterans with life-threatening conditions waiting for over six months just to see a doctor. On April 27, 2017, President Donald Trump signed Executive Order 13793 (Improving Accountability and Whistleblower Protection at the Department of Veterans Affairs) to help whistleblowers and increase accountability at the Department of Veterans Affairs. In 2018, President Donald Trump signed the VA Maintaining Internal Systems and Strengthening Integrated Outside Networks Act of 2018 (VA MISSION Act of 2018) into law which made several improvements to the existing VA Choice program and amended the 2014 legislation.

== See also ==
- List of bills in the 113th United States Congress
- List of Veterans Affairs medical facilities
- Acts of the 113th United States Congress
- Veteran Access to Care Act of 2014
