= Veteran Access to Care Act of 2014 =

Proposed law in the United States

- Long title: To direct the Secretary of Veterans Affairs to enter into contracts for the provision of hospital care and medical services at non-Department of Veterans Affairs facilities for Department of Veterans Affairs patients with extended waiting times for appointments at Department facilities, and for other purposes.
- Announced in: the 113th United States Congress
- Sponsored by: Rep. Jeff Miller (R-FL)

Legislative history
- Introduced in the House as H.R. 4810 by Rep. Jeff Miller (R-FL) on June 9, 2014; Committee consideration by United States House Committee on Veterans' Affairs, United States Senate Committee on Veterans' Affairs; Passed the House on June 10, 2014 (Roll Call Vote 287: 426-0)

The Veteran Access to Care Act of 2014 (H.R. 4810) is a bill that would allow United States veterans to receive their healthcare from non-VA facilities under certain conditions. The bill is a response to the Veterans Health Administration scandal of 2014, in which it was discovered that there was systematic lying about the wait times veterans experienced waiting to be seen by doctors. By June 5, 2014, Veterans Affairs internal investigations had identified a total of 35 veterans who had died while waiting for care in the Phoenix VHA system. Another audit determined that "more than 57,000 veterans waited at least 90 days to see a doctor, while another 63,000 over the last decade never received an initial appointment."

The bill was introduced into the United States House of Representatives during the 113th United States Congress.

== Background ==
CNN reported on April 30, 2014, that at least 40 United States Armed Forces veterans died while waiting for care at the Phoenix, Arizona, Veterans Health Administration facilities. By June 5, 2014, Veterans Affairs internal investigations had identified a total of 35 veterans who had died while waiting for care in the Phoenix VHA system. An investigation of delays in treatment throughout the Veterans Health Administration system is being conducted by the Veterans Affairs Office of the Inspector General, and the House has passed legislation to fund a $1 million criminal investigation by the Justice Department. On May 16, 2014, the Veterans Health Administration's top health official, Dr. Robert Petzel, retired early at the request of Secretary of Veterans Affairs Eric Shinseki. On May 30, 2014, Secretary Shinseki, himself, resigned from office amid the fallout from the controversy. As of early June 2014, several other VA medical centers around the nation have been identified with the same problems as the Phoenix facility, and the investigations by the VA Inspector General, the Congress and others are widening.

== Provisions of the bill ==
This summary is based largely on the summary provided by the Congressional Research Service, a public domain source.

The Veteran Access to Care Act of 2014 would, in section 2, direct the Secretary of Veterans Affairs (VA) to enter into contracts with such non-VA facilities as may be necessary to furnish hospital care and medical services to veterans who:

- have waited longer than the wait-time goals of the Veterans Health Administration (VHA) (as of June 1, 2014) for an appointment for hospital care or medical services in a VA facility;
- have been notified by a VA facility that an appointment for hospital care or medical services is not available within such wait-time goals; or
- reside more than 40 miles from the VA medical facility, including a community-based outpatient clinic, that is closest to their residence.

The bill would allow eligible veterans who opt for hospital care or medical services in a non-VA facility to receive such care or services through the completion of the episode of care, but for no longer than 60 days.

The bill would direct the Secretary to submit a quarterly report to Congress on the provision of such hospital care and medical services through contracts with non-VA facilities.

The bill would terminate the Secretary's authority to contract with non-VA facilities for the provision of such care and services two years after this Act's enactment.

Section 3 would direct the Secretary, to the extent that appropriations are available to the VHA for medical services, to reimburse non-VA facilities with which the VA does not have such a contract for providing hospital care and medical services to such veterans, if such care and services cannot be provided within the VHA's wait-time goals in a facility with which the VA has a contract. Sets the reimbursement rate for such care or services at the greatest of the VA, Medicare, or TRICARE (a Department of Defense [DOD] managed care program) payment rate for such care or services.

The bill would terminate the Secretary's authority to reimburse non-VA facilities for the provision of such care and services two years after this Act's enactment.

Section 4 would direct the Secretary, within 120 days of this Act's enactment, to enter into a contract or contracts with a private entity or entities with experience in VHA and private delivery systems and in health care management to conduct an independent assessment of the hospital care and medical services furnished in VA facilities.

The bill would list the factors that must be addressed in assessing veterans access to, and the quality of, hospital care and medical services in VA facilities.

The bill would direct the Secretary to submit reports to the congressional veterans committees regarding: (1) the findings and recommendations of the independent assessment; and (2) the Secretary's response to those findings, including an action plan for fully implementing such recommendations.

Section 5 would prohibit the Secretary from paying awards and bonuses to VA employees for FY2014-FY2016.

Section 6 would require the Director of the Office of Management and Budget (OMB), within 30 days of this Act's enactment, to transmit to Congress:

- an estimate of the budgetary effects of this Act's coverage of hospital care and medical services for veterans in non-VA facilities;
- any transfer authority needed to utilize the savings from denying VA awards and bonuses to satisfy such budgetary effects; and
- a request, if necessary, for additional funding, or the transfer or reprogramming of existing funding, for this Act's coverage of the hospital care and medical services provided to veterans in non-VA facilities.

== Congressional Budget Office report ==
This summary is based largely on the summary provided by the Congressional Budget Office, a public domain source.

H.R. 4810 would authorize the Department of Veterans Affairs (VA) to increase the provision of health care by contracting out to non-VA providers. For that purpose, the Secretary would be able to use available appropriations. Thus, the Congressional Budget Office (CBO) anticipates that this bill would make available some appropriated funds that would otherwise lapse - an estimated $620 million over the 2014-2016 period. In addition to those direct spending costs shown above, the bill would also substantially increase spending for veterans' health care, if sufficient appropriations were provided for that purpose. The CBO has not completed an estimate of the discretionary costs.

== Procedural history ==
The Choice Act proposal was introduced to the late senator John McCain on April 18, 2014 by disabled veteran Ricky C. Barnes of Phoenix, Arizona https://www.24-7pressrelease.com/press-release/494376/ricky-c-barnes-has-been-inducted-into-the-prestigious-marquis-whos-who-biographical-registry. Mr. Barnes aspiration for non-VA care for all veterans began 1999 and was finally introduced to the United States House of Representatives in 2014. He was also instrumental in the uncovering of the 2014 Phoenix VA Scandal. The Veteran Access to Care Act of 2014 was introduced into the United States House of Representatives on June 9, 2014, by Rep. Jeff Miller (R-FL). The bill was referred to the United States House Committee on Veterans' Affairs. On June 20, 2014, the House voted to pass the bill in Roll Call Vote 287 by a vote of 426–0. This was actually the second vote the House made on the bill because some members who missed the first vote asked for a re-vote so that they could be on the record in support of the bill. One of the Representatives who missed the vote did so because he was recovering from brain surgery.

The Veteran Access to Care Act of 2014 was received in the United States Senate on June 11, 2014, and was referred to the United States Senate Committee on Veterans' Affairs. On June 11, 2014, the Senate passed its own VA reform bill, the Veterans' Access to Care through Choice, Accountability, and Transparency Act of 2014. Chairman of the House Committee on Veterans Affairs Jeff Miller said that "many of the provisions included in today's Senate-passed bill are based on ideas that have already cleared the House, so I'm hopeful both chambers of Congress can soon agree on a final package to send to the president's desk."

== Debate and discussion ==
Rep. Jeff Miller, who sponsored the bill, said that the wait times veterans were forced to face was "a national disgrace."

Rep. Michael Michaud (D-ME) argued that the care veterans receive at the VA is not the problem, but the wait times were. Michaud stated that "we often hear that the care veterans receive at the VA facilities is second to none. That is, if you can get in... Tens of thousands of veterans are not getting in."

Rep. Julia Brownley (D-CA) argued that the legislation should consider time as well as distance when it came to allowing veterans to visit non-VA medical centers. Brownley argued that "those of us who represent urban areas like Southern California we all know that 40 miles can take the better part of a day to traverse back and forth."

== See also ==
- List of bills in the 113th United States Congress
- List of Veterans Affairs medical facilities
- Veterans' Access to Care through Choice, Accountability, and Transparency Act of 2014
