= Lewis Solmon =

American economist

Lewis C. Solmon
- Born: July 17, 1942; Toronto, Ontario, Canada
- Died: December 17, 2007 (aged 65); Los Angeles, California, United States

Academic background
- Education: University of Toronto, University of Chicago

Academic work
- Discipline: Education economics
- Institutions: Purdue University, City College of New York, CUNY Graduate Center, Higher Education Research Institute, UCLA Graduate School of Education and Information Studies, Milken Institute

Lewis C. Solmon (July 17, 1942 in Toronto – December 17, 2007 in Los Angeles, California) was an American educational economist who advocated for teaching reform, especially merit pay.

== Biography ==
A native of Toronto, Ontario, Canada, Solmon received his undergraduate degree from the University of Toronto in 1964. He then enrolled at the University of Chicago, where he received his masters' in 1967 and his Ph.D. in 1968. He joined the University of California, Los Angeles' Higher Education Research Institute in 1974, and served as dean of the UCLA Graduate School of Education and Information Studies from 1985 to 1991. In 1991, he became the founding president of the Milken Institute. He became the president of the Milken Family Foundation's National Institute for Excellence in Teaching in 2005, and remained in this position until he died in 2007. At the time of his death, he was also a member of the advisory boards of both the California Governor's Committee on Education Excellence and the National Council on Teacher Quality. Soon after Solmon's death, then-California governor Arnold Schwarzenegger described him as "...an outstanding member of the committee" and as "...a great visionary and an extraordinary leader."
