= Merit pay =

Idea of performance-based pay

Merit pay, merit increase or pay for performance, is performance-related pay, frequently in the context of educational reform or government civil service reform (government jobs). It provides bonuses for workers who perform their jobs effectively, according to easily measurable criteria.

In the United States, policy makers are divided on whether merit pay should be offered to public school teachers, and other public employees, as is commonly the case in the United Kingdom.

== History ==
Already in 1913 the Colorado School of Mines advertised the merit pay system, and in 1918 the American Institute of Mining and Metallurgical Engineers was touting merit pay in the mining industry. Prior to 1948 the system had been introduced to Canada, and by 1994 the system was embedded into the Australian mining industry.

By the 1930s, various industries implemented a merit pay system.

One example of a system that uses merit-pay is the Teacher Advancement Program (TAP) created by the Milken Family Foundation in 1999. TAP is currently in place in more than 180 schools all across the United States. In this program, salary raises are based on some aspects of teacher performance, measured by a combination of observations and student test scores. TAP teachers can advance their career in three ways: (1) remain in the classroom and become a mentor to others, (2) leave the classroom and become a master teacher, or (3) advance to administration through traditional means. This program is focused on helping teachers improve performance by learning from others. Teachers are put into small groups that—for a few hours each week—collaborate about what's working in the classroom. The opportunity allows teachers to build skills that will improve classroom learning.

Since adopting TAP in 2001, Bell Street Middle School has doubled the percent of students with advanced scoring in math and reading. The school has also reduced the number of students scoring "below basic level of math" by 46 percent. Another benefit of the TAP program for the middle school has been a reduction in teacher turnover from 32 percent to 10 percent.

One criticism of TAP is that it is expensive for schools, costing from $250 to $400 per student per year. Many TAP schools use grants to fund the program cost. An independent study conducted by Vanderbilt University researchers compared TAP schools' test score gains to non-TAP schools. TAP seems to do better at the elementary school level, but in fact does worse than non-TAP schools in grades 6 through 10.

In 2006, the United States Congress created a $600 million federal grant program called the Teacher Incentive Plan (TIF). In 2009, the program was expanded and supported with American Recovery and Reinvestment Act (ARRA) funding. According to the U.S. Department of Education, the TIF "supports efforts to develop and implement performance-based teacher and principal compensation systems in high-need schools." The program's goals include:

- (1) improving student achievement by increasing teacher and principal effectiveness
- (2) reforming teacher and principal compensation systems so that teachers and principals are rewarded for increases in student achievement
- (3) increasing the number of effective teachers teaching poor, minority, and disadvantaged students in hard-to-staff subjects
- (4) creating sustainable performance-based compensation systems (PBCSs)

A national evaluation of the TIF program has yet to be performed, but preliminary research has provided mixed results. According to an article by the Center for American Progress, an evaluation of programs supported by TIF, such as Denver's ProComp program and the Nashville study (both discussed below), has shown initial evidence that performance-based pay has had a positive effect on student achievement. However, other evaluations, such as a study performed by the Vanderbilt University National Center on Performance Incentives in the metropolitan Nashville School System, have not confirmed the hypothesis that rewarding teachers for improved scores will cause scores to rise.

Denver's Professional Compensation System for Teachers was approved by teachers and financially backed by Denver voters in 2004 and 2005, and it later received additional funding from a TIF grant in 2006. In this program, teachers are given nine ways to increase their earnings, such as working in a high-needs schools, exceeding expectations on state exams, meeting professional objectives set at the beginning of the year, receiving a worthy evaluation from a principal, and gaining "distinguished school" status by meeting mixed criteria such as parent satisfaction. In 2010, an evaluation report detailing effects of ProComp was issued. This report highlighted several key findings in both district-wide student achievement trends, as well as in student achievement outcomes relating to teacher hiring effects. On a district-wide level, the 2010 evaluation showed a substantial increase in mathematics and reading achievement from the immediate time period before ProComp's implementation compared to time period subsequent to the implementation. Additionally, teachers hired after the implementation of ProComp showed higher first-year achievement compared to those hired before the program's implementation.

The National Center on Performance Incentives conducted a three-year study in the metropolitan Nashville School System from 2006 through 2009, in which middle school mathematics teachers participated in an experiment to evaluate the effect of financial rewards for teachers whose students showed large gains on standardized tests. As stated in the study's final findings report, "The experiment was intended to test the notion that rewarding teachers for improved scores would cause scores to rise." The results of the study did not confirm this hypothesis. Students of teachers assigned to the treatment group eligible for bonuses did not outperform students whose teachers were assigned to the control group that was not eligible for bonuses.

== Effort versus selection ==
Most analyses of merit pay, including the Nashville Study, consider whether or not the existing teachers in a school perform better after being offered pay for performance. Scores might go up if teachers work harder or "work better." This situation, often called "increased effort," implies that teachers were not working as hard as they might before the performance pay was offered, and the lack of achievement results implies that the performance pay does not lead to increased effort. On the other hand, an additional feature of performance pay might be improved "selection" of who enters and who stays in teaching. For example, a different group of teachers might be induced to enter the teacher profession if pay was aligned more with performance. And, the best teachers, the ones who get the added performance pay, may on average be induced to stay in the classroom longer. These larger impacts through changes in selection would not show up on the evaluations previously conducted but can show up on overall comparisons of countries that do and do not employ performance pay systems. Ludger Woessmann finds evidence that performance pay does improve performance when viewed across countries. Additionally, the analysis of the impact of dismissing ineffective teachers by Eric Hanushek can be interpreted as a special form of performance pay where pay is reduced to zero (or a very low amount) for teachers who do not perform well.

== Loss aversion and merit pay ==
Loss aversion was first proposed by Daniel Kahneman and Amos Tversky in 1979. They proposed the notion that individuals assign value to gains and losses rather than to final assets. In other words, individuals have a tendency to prefer avoiding losses rather than accruing gains.

This notion of people hating to lose, more than they like gaining something, even if the potential amount that could be lost is the same as the amount to be gained, has been tested in many arenas.

An experiment conducted by Kahneman et al. 1990 Journal of Political Economy describes testing loss aversion through the concepts of the Endowment effect and the Coase Theorem. The endowment effect reveals the notion that people place a higher value on objects they own relative to objects they do not. The Coase theorem focuses on transaction costs and the importance of who owns a particular commodity.

They found that randomly assigned owners of a mug required significantly more money to part with their possession (around $7) than randomly assigned buyers were willing to pay to acquire it (around $3). Kahneman attributed this result to loss aversion: owners were affected more by the loss of the mug compared to the effect of a buyer purchasing the mug as a gain.

Another experiment conducted in 1998 by Terrance Odean at Berkeley College examined the account of 10,000 investors at a large discount brokerage house. The tendency of investors revealed they held on to losing investments too long and sold winning investments too soon. Their behavior did not appear to be motivated by rational re-balancing of portfolios or to avoid higher trading costs. According to Odean, these investors held on to these losing stocks in order to prolong the feeling of loss from selling them, even though there was no evidence that by holding onto them, they would rise in value. "Winning investments that investors chose to sell continued in subsequent months to outperform the losing stocks investors kept."

== Benefits ==
- Leads to better educational outcomes.

Proponents argue that paying teachers according to their effectiveness would be consistent with management precepts from the private sector and would lead to better educational outcomes. Lewis Solmon, President of the TAP and a control group that merit pay contributes toward student achievement. The RAND study concluded that fifty percent of the schools with these reforms outperformed the control schools in math and forty-seven percent outperformed the control in reading.

- Helps low-performing schools attract teachers.

Schools that use merit pay are better able to attract teachers than schools with no merit pay system. This is especially helpful in enabling schools with lower socioeconomic status attract qualified teachers. For instance, a review of the Teacher Advancement Program in Arizona showed that over a three-year period, 61 teachers started working at the two schools of lowest socioeconomic status in the Madison school district, both of which use the TAP and of these teachers 21% have come from schools in high socioeconomic areas.

- Higher teacher retention rates.

Merit pay programs can also alleviate the problem of teacher retention. Stronge, Gareis and Little (2006) argue that merit pay or other performance pay programs provide added motivation for teachers in keeping novice teachers from leaving the profession after a few years and especially in retaining experienced teachers.

- Show the value of a teacher's work

Teachers who actually strive for their students to be better will show under the performance pay.

- Teachers will work harder to maintain their incentives

Higher scores will demonstrate a teacher's ability of going the extra mile.

== Detractors ==
- Low teacher morale and increased competition between teachers.
- Wasted time and money in the administration of the merit pay plans.
- Little evidence from research that incentive programs lead to student achievement.

In 1994 the Urban Institute conducted a study and found some positive short-lived effects of merit pay, but concluded that most merit pay plans "did not succeed at implementing lasting, effective ... plans that had a demonstrated ability to improve student learning." Problems included low teacher morale because of increased competition between teachers, as well as wasted time and money in the administration of the merit pay plans. The same study found "little evidence from other research...that incentive programs (particularly pay-for-performance) had led to improved teacher performance and student achievements."

Marie Gryphon, an education policy analyst at the Cato Institute, makes some practical objections:
- The system can't simply reward high scores. If it did, it would favor teachers in wealthy neighborhoods whose students came to school with excellent skills. Nor can the system reward only improvement. If it did, it would unfairly penalize teachers whose students were already scoring too well to post large gains.
- Moreover, any money for test results scheme will worsen the problem of teachers cheating on standardized tests to avoid the consequences of the No Child Left Behind Act. Teachers willing to erase wrong answers on exams to avoid having their school labeled "needing improvement" will also be tempted by the thought of a personal raise.

- Teachers may not feel the need to help one another and may feel they have to compete with one another.
- Merit pay may lead educators to become dishonest in order to receive the higher pay of higher test scores.

== Political opinions and implementation history ==
=== Teacher merit pay ===
Some political figures support the merit-pay system as an effective policy for enhancing educational quality.

==== Political reactions ====
Jeb Bush, governor of Florida during that time, enacted a 5 percent bonus for the top 25 percent of teachers in the state of Florida. A large factor in selection of the top 25 percent of teachers was student score improvement. A similar program was implemented in Houston at the same time, only lacking a limit on the percentage of teachers who could receive the bonus. Teachers in both states rebelled, stating that a year of instruction can't be measured in a single test, on a single day. These systems showed other imperfections as well. For example, a county in Florida ran out of money before all the teachers received bonuses. Accusations of discrimination also existed, a result of difference in pay between predominantly black and predominantly white schools.

President Barack Obama supports merit pay for teachers but believes teachers' pay should be increased based on performance tests, not arbitrary tests. He wishes to work with the National Education Association (NEA) to find a new system to get rid of performance pay.

The National Education Association (NEA) adamantly opposes some forms of merit pay. In June 2003, NEA President Reg Weaver said:

Teachers understand that politically motivated panaceas such as merit pay and eliminating tenure do nothing to improve teacher quality. Our members are open to alternatives, but we will always oppose quick fixes designed to weaken the voice of teachers and effectiveness of education employees in all jobs.

In September 2011, Obama took steps to reform certain unpopular and ineffective provisions of No Child Left Behind: "Congress hasn't been able to do it, so I will. The most notable change to the law related to the 2014 deadline for all schools to bring their entire student body to "proficient" levels in reading and math. The Obama administration offered a pass on the deadline and the opportunity to design their own accountability systems to some schools. The provisions that required failing schools to offer after-school tutoring and no-cost bus transportation to better schools were also waived.

To qualify for the waivers, however, states must demonstrate an adoption of "college and career ready" academic standards and deliver a sketch of how they plan to transform their lowest performing schools. States that apply for these waivers this fall can be reviewed by the Education Department early next year. According to Eugene Wilhoit, executive director of the Council of Chief State School Officers, likely candidates for early application include Georgia, Kentucky, Wisconsin, and Colorado. Wilhoit believes that other states will also apply for the waiver after watching the process unfold for the states that apply early. Still, other states are not likely to apply at all since they are unwilling to disrupt current accountability systems if No Child Left Behind could soon be overhauled by Congress.

=== Federal government merit pay ===
==== Clinton and Gore ====
In early 1993, incoming President Bill Clinton—inheriting a federal government mired in recession and record debt—assigned his vice president, Al Gore, to form a National Performance Review (NPR) panel to undertake a "Reinventing Government" initiative "to create a government that 'works better, costs less, and gets results Americans care about.'"

In 1993, with Executive Order 12862, the President called for a revolution in government's customer service to deliver services equal to the best in business.

Working with David Osborne (noted co-author of the popular book Reinventing Government) and leaders in government, business and organizational development, the committee made numerous recommendations, and developed implementation schemes for them. Among those was "III. Reinvent To Get The Job Done With Less - 9. Create Performance-Based Organizations (PBOs)." The NPR's "Blair House Papers" explained that:

Performance-Based Organizations (PBOs) are discrete management units that commit to clear objectives, specific measurable goals, customer service standards, and targets for improved performance. Once designated, they would have customized managerial flexibilities and a competitively hired chief executive, who would sign an annual performance agreement with the Secretary and have a share of his or her pay depend on the organization's performance. The British, who have extensive experience with this concept, find that such agencies improve performance and cut administrative costs.

Thus began the modern movement towards merit-based pay in U.S. federal civil service. However, the NPR was clear that not all functions of government were suited to such performance-rewarded incentives:

In a PBO, the policy-making and regulatory functions are split from their program operations. The PBO focuses on programmatic operations. Not all government agencies are suited to become PBOs. Operations that do not have clear, measurable results should be excluded. For example, the foreign policy and planning offices in the State Department or basic scientific research offices at the National Institutes for Health may be inappropriate candidates.

Subsequent efforts of the NPR (by 1999 renamed the "National Partnership for Reinventing Government") led to additional efforts to identify and apply effective and suitable ways to reward federal employee performance.

==== Bush ====
In 2004, Pres. George W. Bush and other Republicans favored shifting federal civilian employee salary pay raises from across-the-board uniform raises towards a merit-based pay system—particularly through a proposed system called the "...Human Capital Performance Fund, which agencies can use to reward their highest performing employees,..." according to a March, 2004 letter to Congress from the Bush administration's Director of the Office of Management & Budget (OMB), Joshua Bolten. The Bush Budget Director's letter goes on to say:

The President's pay proposal provides sufficient pay not only to recruit and retain needed workers, but also to reward the government’s highest performing employees. The Administration is implementing better agency performance appraisal systems that will be able to distinguish superior performance. Such systems will enable agencies to reward employees with funds from the Human Capital Performance Fund. These incentives will produce improved performance and results for the American people. Federal workers should be rewarded with a pay policy that most effectively recruits, retains, and rewards quality employees.

Critics, particularly Democrats, especially from districts with high dependence on federal civilian employment (e.g.: around Washington, D.C., in adjoining Maryland and Virginia), expressed objections to the Bush administration's desire to allocate raises differently for civilian federal workers than for military personnel.

==== Obama ====
Inheriting the merit pay programs instituted by the prior administration—along with two wars and the "Great Recession," and a divided Congress—Pres. Barack Obama, and both parties in Congress, found difficulty in managing federal employee compensation.

Despite an official pay freeze, federal employee compensation continued to rise—owing in part to the merit pay ("pay-for-performance" or "employee bonus") system, but also due to promotions and to automatic scheduled increases in "completing waiting periods used in grade- and step-type pay systems." Chairman of the House Oversight & Government Reform Committee, Rep. Darrell Issa (R-Calif.) claimed, "These increases are driven by automatic, tenure-based pay hikes that are in no way tied to merit or performance."

Congressional Democrats and federal employees' unions responded that federal workers were not paid competitively with the private market, and the increases were overdue. Critics, however, and the Congressional Budget Office (CBO), concluded that federal workers earned substantially more than their counterparts in the private sector. A CBO report said overall average federal compensation was 16% higher than in for corresponding work in the private sector.

On December 27, 2012, Obama issued an executive order giving federal employees an across-the-board raise, estimated by Congressional Republicans as costing taxpayers "$11 billion over ten years." In response, in February, 2013, House Republicans passed H.R. 273 "Overturning the President’s Federal Pay Hike," to undo Obama's blanket federal pay hike. However, underscoring their commitment to incentive-based compensation, they took pains to note that merit pay remained. In a "Fact Sheet" on the bill, the committee reported:

Federal Workers Still Get Raises
H.R. 273 does NOT prevent federal employees from receiving bonuses, merit based pay increases, promotions, or even tenure based pay increases – commonly referred to as “step” increases. It simply prevents the President from implementing a planned across the board increase for all federal employees

==== Brookings Institution ====
In late 2013, the Brookings Institution, a liberal think tank, published research by analysts Choi and Whitford, who cautioned that—despite a shift of resources to merit-based pay for federal workers, intended to "better align pay and performance"—such efforts often fail, and such incentives "may not work" for "public organizations." However, rather than focus on the results of merit-based pay in "individual and organizational performance," Choi and Whitford focused, instead, on its effects on "job satisfaction," saying that is "often a good predictor of performance." They studied federal government "findings" that indicated that subjecting federal employees to merit-based pay produces workers who are "consistently less happy" with their pay, their job and their organization, than those federal employees paid in "traditional compensation systems." Their report expresses concern that this could affect long-term outcomes.

==== Veterans Health Administration scandal of 2014 ====
The idea of merit pay receive a major discrediting blow from the Veterans Health Administration controversy of 2014, which revealed nationwide altering of records by Veterans Health Administration executives, including falsifying patient waiting lists and wait times, and keeping "secret" wait lists to ensure receiving merit pay bonuses. Over 1,000 veterans were reported to have been affected, as of June 2014, with dozens having apparently died waiting for care.

The scandal became a leading U.S. domestic news story in 2014, resulting in investigations by the VA Inspector General, Congress, and others.

The issue first became a major national topic when a doctor at the VA hospital in Phoenix reported that perhaps more than 40 patients had died due to false and secret waiting-lists that delayed or prevented their care. Subsequent reports found similar allegations at many other VA medical facilities around the nation. Patient wait times were a metric used to determine executive bonuses, and it is alleged that the delays in care were concealed by wait list abuses in order to ensure that staff received bonuses.

Citing records obtained by OpentheBooks.com through a Freedom of Information Act (FOIA) request, Fox News reported that Employees at the Phoenix VA office were paid "millions in higher-than-average salaries and bonuses," adding that between 2011 and 2013, "over $843,000 in bonuses" were paid out to approximately "half the system's 3,170 workers". This averages to approximately $530 per rewarded employee, though bonuses varied widely and most employees did not receive any bonus money; Fox News reported that the Phoenix VA's Director, Sharon Helman, got the largest bonus in 2013 of $9,345.

Subsequent allegations and audits revealed the waiting list issue in Phoenix was not unique, but part of a wider, systemic problem in the VA nationwide, with secret waiting lists and related issues being uncovered at numerous other VA medical facilities, including in Chicago, Kansas City, Wichita, El Paso, and elsewhere.

On May 30, 2014, President Obama accepted the resignation of Secretary of Veterans Affairs, Gen. Eric Shenseki, noting that:

A few minutes ago, Secretary Shinseki and Rob Nabors, who I've temporarily assigned to work with the VA, presented me with the department's initial review of VA facilities nationwide. And what they've found is that the misconduct has not been limited to a few VA facilities, but many across the country. That's totally unacceptable. Secretary Shinseki has now begun the process of firing many of the people responsible, including senior leaders at the Phoenix VA. He's canceled any possible performance bonuses this year for VHA senior executives.

== See also ==
- Pay for performance, which includes:
  - Pay for performance (healthcare)—an emerging movement in health insurance in Britain and the United States, in which providers are rewarded for quality of healthcare services
  - Pay for performance (human resources)—a system of employee payment in the United States that links compensation to measures of work quality or goals
  - Pay for play, money is exchanged for services
  - Pay-for-Performance (Federal Government)—proposed and implemented systems of incentive pay based on job performance metrics. (See also "Federal Government Merit Pay" section in this Merit Pay article, above.)
- Performance-related pay
- Incentive program
- Veterans Health Administration scandal of 2014
