= Demanding Accountability for Veterans Act of 2013 =

- Long title: To amend title 38, United States Code, to improve the accountability of the Secretary of Veterans Affairs to the Inspector General of the Department of Veterans Affairs.
- Announced in: the 113th United States Congress
- Sponsored by: Rep. Dan Benishek (R, MI-1)
- Number of co-sponsors: 0

Codification
- Acts affected: Inspector General Act of 1978
- U.S.C. sections affected: 38 U.S.C. § 712, 38 U.S.C. § 711, 5 U.S.C. § 5384, 5 U.S.C. § {{{2}}}, 38 U.S.C. ch. 7, and others.
- Agencies affected: United States Department of Veterans Affairs, Inspector General

Legislative history
- Introduced in the House as H.R. 2072 by Rep. Dan Benishek (R, MI-1) on May 21, 2013; Committee consideration by United States House Committee on Veterans' Affairs, United States House Veterans' Affairs Subcommittee on Health

The Demanding Accountability for Veterans Act of 2013 (H.R. 2072) is a bill that would require the Inspector General (IG) of the United States Department of Veterans Affairs (VA) to take additional action if the VA has not appropriately responded to an IG report that recommends actions to be taken by the Secretary of Veterans Affairs to address a VA public health or safety issue. The Secretary would be required to act swiftly on such IG reports, with the bill specifying actions to take. The Secretary would also be forbidden from giving any bonuses to managers with unresolved issues.

The bill was introduced into the United States House of Representatives during the 113th United States Congress.

== Background ==
The bill was introduced in the U.S. House of Representatives May 21, 2013, but apparently did not get scheduled for a floor vote until after the Veterans Health Administration scandal of 2014 erupted in the Spring of 2014. This bill was scheduled for a vote in the House the week of May 26, 2014 in part due to on-going "allegations that several VA hospitals tried to conceal long wait times for medical care." These questions about substandard timely care and false records came to light in May 2014. The situation involved treatment of veterans in a number of VA hospitals. Eric Shinseki, then Secretary of the Department of Veterans Affairs, resigned May 30, 2014. Senior Veterans Affairs officials reportedly kept secret waiting lists in order to hide the high number of veterans that were forced to wait for months to receive important medical care. As many as 450 senior officials may have been involved, including VA hospital managers. Some veterans died while they were still awaiting treatment.

A VA department handbook on administrative policies indicates that employees have 30 days to appeal any disciplinary action before it can be taken and have all disciplinary actions or reprimands removed from their records after two years. The department has to meet high standards for doing things like separately proving an employee was absent each and every day if the employee quits showing up to work and proving that there is a direct relationship between the misconduct and their own efficiency.

Data provided by the Office of Personnel Management shows that only 7,349 federal employees were fired in 2013 out of a total of almost 2 million.

== Provisions of the bill ==
This summary is based largely on the summary provided by the Congressional Research Service, a public domain source.

The Demanding Accountability for Veterans Act of 2013 would require the Inspector General (IG) of the Department of Veterans Affairs (VA), upon determining that the VA Secretary has not appropriately responded to an IG report that recommends actions to be taken by the Secretary to address a VA public health or safety issue, to notify the Secretary and the congressional veterans committees of such failure.

The bill would require the Secretary: (1) within 15 days after such notification, to submit to the IG a list of the names of each responsible VA manager and the matter for which the manager is responsible; (2) within 7 days after such submission, to notify each such manager of the covered issue; (3) to direct such manager to resolve the issue, (4) to provide the manager with appropriate counseling and a mitigation plan for resolving the issue; and (5) to ensure that a manager's performance review includes an evaluation of actions taken with respect to such issue.

The bill would prohibit the Secretary from paying a bonus or award to any manager whose issue remains unresolved.

=== Amendments ===
- increased fees on VA loans for some veterans
- verification of the income of people receiving VA pensions to be certain that they qualify
- allow residency in medical foster homes for veterans whose care in a nursing home is paid for by the VA

== Congressional Budget Office report ==
This summary is based largely on the summary provided by the Congressional Budget Office, as ordered reported by the House Committee on Veterans’ Affairs on August 1, 2013. This is a public domain source.

H.R. 2072 would increase the fees charged to certain veterans who obtain loans guaranteed by the Department of Veterans Affairs (VA). It also would extend VA's authority to verify income reported by recipients of VA pension benefits using data from the Internal Revenue Service (IRS). Those two changes would decrease direct spending by $182 million over the 2014-2018 period and by $191 million over the 2014-2023 period, the Congressional Budget Office (CBO) estimates. Pay-as-you-go procedures apply because enacting the legislation would affect direct spending.

H.R. 2072 also would increase spending subject to appropriation, primarily by allowing VA to pay for eligible veterans to live in medical foster homes. The CBO estimates that implementing H.R. 2072 would have a discretionary cost of $170 million over the 2014-2018 period, subject to appropriation of the necessary amounts.

H.R. 2072 contains no intergovernmental or private-sector mandates as defined in the Unfunded Mandates Reform Act.

== Procedural history ==
The Demanding Accountability for Veterans Act of 2013 was introduced into the United States House of Representatives on May 21, 2013, by Rep. Dan Benishek (R, MI-1). It was referred, the same day, to the United States House Committee on Veterans' Affairs and on May 31, 2013, to the United States House Veterans' Affairs Subcommittee on Health. On October 16, 2013, it was reported (amended) alongside House Report 113-245 and placed on the placed on the Union Calendar, (Calendar No. 173). Based on the Congressional records cited, it apparently went nowhere significant until after the Veterans Health Administration scandal of 2014 erupted in the Spring of 2014.

== Debate and discussion ==
In a House Veterans' Affairs Subcommittee on Health hearing on May 21, 2013, Aleks Morosky, the senior legislative associate of Veterans of Foreign Wars of the United States (VFW) testified against the bill in introductory form on behalf of the VFW. Morosky said that the VFW agreed with the bill's intent, but were "concerned with the precedent set by placing IG in a personnel management role. Managers must be held responsible for failing to properly perform their duties, but VA must maintain direct control over the accountability of its employees."

Rep. Benishek (R-MI), who introduced the bill, said that it targets "bureaucrats in Washington who drag their feet and don't do their jobs."

== See also ==
- List of bills in the 113th United States Congress
- Inspector generals in the United States
