= Performance-related pay =

System in which pay is directly tied to employee performance

Performance-related pay or pay for performance, not to be confused with performance-related pay rise, is a salary or wages paid system based on positioning the individual, or team, on their pay band according to how well they perform. Car salesmen or production line workers, for example, may be paid in this way, or through commission.

Many employers use this standards-based system for evaluating employees and for setting salaries. Standards-based methods have been in de facto use for centuries among commission-based sales staff: they receive a higher salary for selling more, and low performers do not earn enough to make keeping the job worthwhile even if they manage to keep the job. In effect, the salary would be re-evaluated up, or down, periodically (usually annually) based on the performance of the individual or team. The reward is the salary: with an expectation to be high on the pay band for high performance and low on the band for low performance.

In comparison, the performance-related pay rise system would see the reward given in the form of a pay rise. The better the performance of the individual or team the larger the rise, likewise, if the performance was poor the associated rise would be minimal, if any at all. The reward is the pay rise: with an expectation of a high pay rise for high performance and a low or zero rise for low performance.

== Research ==
What fraction of pay depends on performance, and what is meant by performance, can vary widely.

Research on extreme high-stakes incentives funded by the Federal Reserve Bank undertaken at the Massachusetts Institute of Technology with input from professors from the University of Chicago and Carnegie Mellon University repeatedly demonstrated that as long as the tasks being undertaken are purely mechanical, very large performance related pay incentives work as expected. However once rudimentary cognitive skills are required, very high-stakes incentives actually lead to poorer performance.

These experiments have since been repeated by a range of economists, sociologists and psychologists with the same results. Experiments were also undertaken in Madurai, India, where the financial amounts involved represented far more significant sums to participants and the results were again repeated. These findings have been specifically highlighted by Daniel H. Pink in his work examining how motivation works.

== Cultural aspects ==
An international study by Schuler and Rogovsky in 1998 pointed out that cultural differences affect the kind of reward systems that are in use. According to the study, there is a connection among

- status-based reward systems (as opposed to achievement-based) and high uncertainty avoidance,
- individual performance based systems and individualism,
- systems incorporating extensive social benefits and femininity and
- employee ownership plans with individualism, low uncertainty avoidance and low power distance.

(See Geert Hofstede for the dimensions of cultures used.)

== Advocacy ==
Business theorists Professor Yasser and Dr Wasi support this method of payment, which is often referred to as PRP. Yasser believes that money is the main incentive for increased productivity and introduced the widely used concept of piece work (known outside business theory since at least 1549).

In addition to motivating the rewarded behavior, standards-based payment methods can provide a level of standardization in employee evaluations, which can reduce fears of favoritism and make the employer's expectations clear. For example, an employer might set a minimum standard of 12,000 keystrokes per hour in a simple data-entry job and reassign or replace employees who cannot perform at that level.

With PRP, employees can expect their performance to be evaluated objectively according to the standard of their work rather than the subjective opinions of a supervisor or against the average of their group. Generally, new starters begin at the bottom of the pay band and, subject to normal performance, are moved up to the midpoint (market target) within three to five years. To promote themselves, some unethical managers will suppress salaries by offering cost of living rises instead of true progression through the pay scale. That allows short-term savings but, in the longer term leads to low morale, low performance, poor engagement, and even employee resignations after training. All of these consequences prove costly to the business. However, used properly, PRP is a very effective way to get the best from employees. There is, however, a reverse phenomenon in which employees produce pay-related performance if a given salary remains below 80% of the pay band for any length of time.

Successful managers and organizations know that hiring and keeping the best employees maximizes profit. If a business always tries to maximize profit, it will actively try to reduce expenses whenever possible, including employees’ wages. In fact, most companies pay employees as little as they can get away with, but that results in employees who will, in turn, provide as little effort as they can get away with. Many companies, nevertheless, still stick to the archaic, counterproductive goal of trying to minimize compensation. Though it may seem to be cost effective to apply the profit-first mentality of low-as-possible wages, it ultimately impedes employee performance and engagement and damages the bottom line.

== Opposition ==
A fundamental criticism of performance-related pay is that the performance of a complex job as a whole is reduced to a simple, often single measure of performance. For instance a telephone call center helpline may judge the quality of an employee based upon the average length of a call with a customer.

As a simple measure, this gives no regard to the quality of help given, for instance whether the issue was resolved, or whether the customer emerged satisfied. Performance-related pay may also cause a hostile work attitude, as in times of low customer volume when multiple employees may compete for the attentions of a single customer. Where a customer has been helped by more than one employee, further resentment may be caused if the commission is taken by whoever happens to make the final sale. Macroscopic factors such as an economic downturn may also make employees appear to be performing to a lower standard independent of actual performance.

Performance-based systems have met some opposition as they are being adopted by corporations and governments. In some cases, opposition is motivated by specific ill-conceived standards, such as one which makes employees work at unsafe speeds, or a system which does not take all factors properly into account.

Employers can use these compensation schemes to extract as much labor from their employees as possible, effectively working them to exhaustion and into an inevitable injury in order to maximize productivity. Even worse for employees, baseline productivity rates and other variables in these particular performance pay structures are set, altered, and ultimately controlled, often subjectively, by the employer. By setting unrealistic performance expectations, employers can effectively raise productivity and lower wages simultaneously by shifting the blame of an unfair system with impossible incentive milestones onto their employees, claiming employees are simply not meeting the minimum performance thresholds to earn the additional compensation that makes the substantial effort required under these schemes worth it in the first place. Under other, more company-specific pay schemes, the employer defines a particular workload to an employee, forcing X amount of hours of work for them to complete for that shift. But the employer sets the projected time it should take unreasonably lower than X, effectively lowering that employee's hourly rate for the entire shift. This can even be used to avoid paying overtime in some circumstances, and is a common tactic used in various US based warehousing operations and short-haul/LTL delivery companies, notably in wholesale food and restaurant service companies, especially where employees lack the union representation that's usually required to bargain for fair rates under pay schemes like these, as well as safe, tolerable working conditions.

In other cases, opposition is motivated by a dislike of the consequences. For example, a company may have had a compensation system which paid employees strictly according to their seniority. They may change to a system that pays sales staff according to how much they sell. Low-performing senior employees would object to having their income cut to match their performance level, while a high-performing new employee might prefer the new arrangement.

Another argument is that the judgment of one's performance can be subjective (the judgement of the same quality of work can vary from department to department in a company and from supervisor to supervisor).

=== Financial sector ===
A further example can be seen in the public policy responses to Incentive Pay or Bonuses in the financial services sector following the financial crisis in 2008. The structure of the incentive pay schemes were deemed to be a contributing factor to the crisis and regulators around the world, co-ordinated by the Financial Stability Board issued recommendations to ensure that incentives schemes were re-designed. In Europe this has led to the Capital Requirements Directives legislation which has established a cap on variable or incentive pay which can be not more than 100% of the fixed pay for an individual in any given year, rising to 200% with shareholder approval.

== See also ==
- Merit Pay
- Incentive program
- Compensation of employees
- Seasonal bonuses (Japan)
- Pay for performance (healthcare)
- Pay-for-Performance (U.S. Federal Government)
- Pay for play
