= 2014 Veterans Health Administration controversy =

Reported pattern of negligence in the treatment of United States military veterans

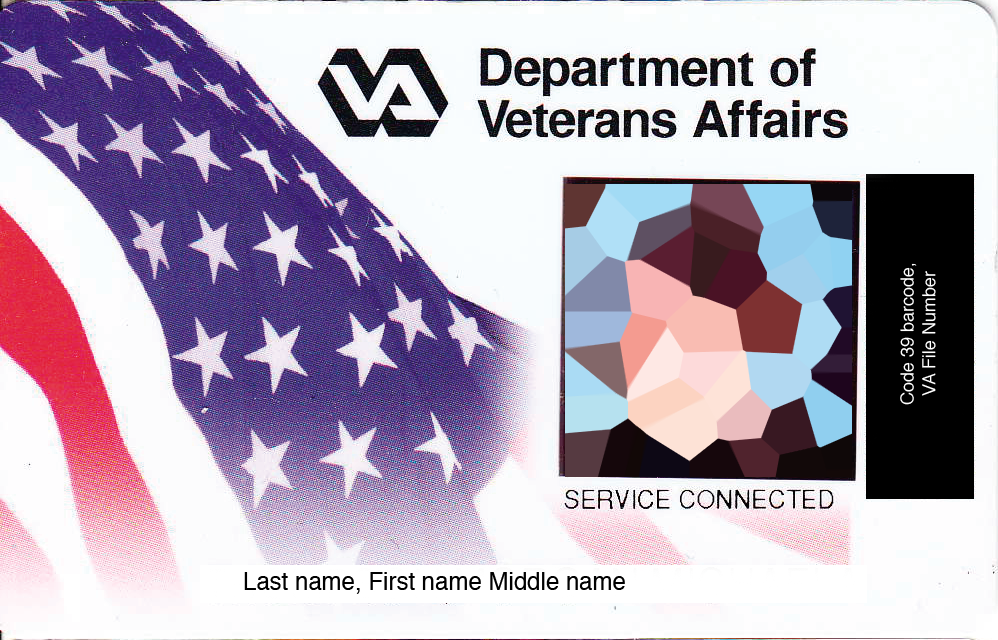
A Veterans Affairs veteran identification card with information redacted

The 2014 Veterans Health Administration controversy is a reported pattern of negligence in the treatment of United States military veterans. Critics charged that patients at the VHA hospitals had not met the target of getting an appointment within 14 days. In some hospitals, the staff falsified appointment records to appear to meet the 14-day target. Some patients died while they were on the waiting list. Defenders agreed that it was unacceptable to falsify data, but the 14-day target was unrealistic in understaffed facilities like Phoenix, and most private insurers did not meet a 14-day target either. By most measures, the VHA system provides "excellent care at low cost", wrote Paul Krugman, who believes that the attacks on the VHA system are motivated by conservatives who want to discredit a government program that works well. Conservative legislators have proposed privatizing the VHA, and legislative reforms that will make it easier for veterans to go to private doctors.

CNN reported on April 30, 2014, that at least 40 United States Armed Forces veterans died while waiting for care at the Phoenix, Arizona, Veterans Health Administration facilities. By June 5, 2014, Veterans Affairs internal investigations had identified 35 veterans who had died while waiting for care in the Phoenix VHA system. An investigation of delays in treatment throughout the Veterans Health Administration system is being conducted by the Veterans Affairs Office of the Inspector General, and the House has passed legislation to fund a $1 million criminal investigation by the Justice Department. On May 16, 2014, the Veterans Health Administration's top health official, Dr. Robert Petzel, retired early at the request of Secretary of Veterans Affairs Eric Shinseki. On May 30, 2014, Secretary Shinseki resigned from office amid the fallout from the controversy. As of early June 2014, several other VA medical centers around the nation have been identified with the same problems as the Phoenix facility, and the investigations by the VA Inspector General, the Congress and others are widening. An internal VA audit released June 9, 2014 found that more than 120,000 veterans were left waiting or never got care and that schedulers were pressured to use unofficial lists or engage in inappropriate practices to make waiting times appear more favorable. On June 11, 2014, the Federal Bureau of Investigation opened a criminal investigation of the VA. President Barack Obama ordered a White House investigation. On June 27, 2014, Obama's Deputy Chief of Staff, Rob Nabors, reported "significant and chronic system failures" and a "corrosive culture" inside the Veterans Health Administration. In August 2014, Obama signed Congressional legislation regarding funding and reform of the Veterans Health Administration.

== Background ==
The Veterans Health Administration, a division of the U.S. Department of Veterans Affairs, is responsible for providing health care to U.S. military veterans, and is one of the largest healthcare operators in the United States, with dozens of hospitals and medical facilities across the nation. It has had a long and troubled history.

=== Goals for patient wait times ===
Timeliness of care was an important goal to the VHA. In 1995, VHA established a goal of scheduling primary and specialty care medical appointments within 30 days to ensure veterans' timely access to care. VHA began collecting patients wait time data in 2000 for which the then-General Accounting Office (GAO) reported inaccuracies. By July 2002, VA reported to Congress that over 300,000 veterans nationwide were either forced onto waiting lists or forced to wait over six months for a medical appointment.

Despite questions raised by GAO and the VA Office of Inspector General as to the validity of VA's performance in providing timely care to veterans, VHA shortened the wait time goal to 14 days for both primary and specialty care medical appointments in fiscal year 2011. In fiscal year 2012, VHA added a goal of completing primary care medical appointments within 7 days of the desired date.

=== VA caseload ===
Healthcare workload on VA increased substantially from 2007 to 2013. VA experienced an increase of 46% in outpatient visits from 63 million in 2007 to 92 million in 2013. Also, inpatients treated increased 11% from over 811,000 to nearly 902,000.

There are fundamental problems at the Veterans Health Administration of staffing being inadequate for aging Vietnam veterans and for more recent veterans from Iraq and Afghanistan who may have complex health challenges such as traumatic brain injury, multiple limb amputations and prosthetics, diabetes and post-traumatic stress disorder.

=== VA funding ===
In 2013 the VA spent $41.5 billion on Veterans' healthcare, an increase of 16% from 2007 ($36.2), while the number of individual patients increased by 18% from 5.5 million in 2007 to 6.5 million in 2013. Recent wars in Iraq and Afghanistan increased demands on VA resources with the number of veterans of these wars who went to VA for care increasing 200% from 2007 to 2013, The Veterans Benefits Administration also received an additional $1.2 billion as part of the American Recovery and Reinvestment Act of 2009.

In early June 2014, soon after the scandal became public, the U.S. Senate passed a $500 million aid bill for the VA.

=== Merit pay bonuses & previous reports of preventable deaths ===
As of April 2014, the VA had paid approximately "$200 million for nearly 1,000 veterans' wrongful deaths". Agency spokesperson Victoria Dillon said that "any adverse incident for a veteran within our care is one too many", but the deaths were a small fraction of the 6 million veterans which receive VA care each year. The House Committee on Veterans' Affairs held a hearing on preventable patient deaths in VA facilities in September 2013 during which representatives accused the VA of failing to discipline the officials responsible for patient deaths and instead providing performance bonuses. For example, VA regional director Michael Moreland received a bonus of approximately $63,000 and a five-page performance evaluation that made no mention of an outbreak of Legionnaires' disease that led to the deaths of six veterans and illness for 21 others at a Pittsburgh VHA hospital for which Moreland was responsible.

=== Previous reports of inaccurate data and subsequent manipulation ===
The then-General Accounting Office (GAO) has issued reports since VA started gathering data in 2000 on veterans' wait times to be scheduled for an appointment and these GAO reports have called into question the reliability, and validity, of VA's wait time data.

The VA Office of Inspector General (OIG) reports in 2005, 2007, and 2008 found the reported outpatient waiting times to be unreliable because of data integrity concerns associated with VHA's scheduling system. The discrepancies found by the OIG between requested appointment times documented in medical records and in the databases, and incomplete waiting lists are attributed to patient preference or the scheduler's use of inappropriate scheduling procedures. Veterans Affairs officials warned the Obama-Biden transition team in the weeks after the 2008 presidential election that the department should not trust the wait times that its facilities were reporting.

According to a 2010 VA memo, the problem of "gaming strategies" inside the VA to meet performance goals dates to at least 2008. VA Deputy Undersecretary for Health Administrative Operations William Schoenhard wrote, "It has come to my attention that in order to improve scores on assorted access measures, certain facilities have adopted use of inappropriate scheduling practices..." Schoenhard listed 24 tactics identified in a 2008 study as inappropriately reducing the official measures of patient wait times.

== Examples ==
=== Phoenix Veterans Health Administration system ===
In one example, 71-year-old U.S. Navy veteran Thomas Breen was rushed to the Phoenix VA on September 28, 2013, with "blood in his urine and a history of cancer". His family said that he was sent home with instructions that he was to be seen within "one week" by a primary care doctor or urologist, and a note on his patient chart said the situation was urgent. After being sent home, his family said that they were told that there was a seven-month waiting list and that there were other critical patients. Thomas Breen died on November 30, 2013. His death certificate shows that he died from bladder cancer. His family said that the VA called on December 6, 2013, to make an appointment after Breen had died.

Dr. Sam Foote, who retired after 24 years of service with the Phoenix VA system, went public with allegations against the VHA in comments to CNN in April 2014. He said that there was an "official" list at the Phoenix VA that was sent to Washington officials and showed that appointments were timely, and an unofficial list where veterans may wait for care for more than a year. Foote said, "The scheme was deliberately put in place to avoid the VA's own internal rules". He said that workers at the Phoenix VA were intimidated into complying with the deception. "They have families, they have mortgages and if they speak out or say anything to anybody about it, they will be fired and they know that."

=== Austin Veterans Health Administration system ===
A scheduler at an Austin, Texas, VHA care clinic said that the practice of "zeroing out" delays in appointments "wasn't a secret at all" at the clinic, and he was instructed by a supervisor in how the process worked. The Austin scheduler said that said "zeroing out" was a practice of falsifying information in the VA's records system that Washington officials used to monitor patient wait times.

=== Fort Collins, Colorado and Cheyenne, Wyoming ===
VA Deputy Undersecretary for Health Administrative Operations William Schoenhard wrote a memo on March 15, 2013, indicating that the VA was changing its performance measure for appointment wait times. The new goal involved measuring the number of days between a veteran's desired appointment date and the actual date of the appointment. A VA Office of the Medical Inspector report from December 2013 showed a dramatic change in March 2013 of the number of appointments booked within the 14-day window for the Fort Collins, Colorado outpatient clinic. When investigators asked VA employees to explain "what occurred in March 2013" the employees said that "they were instructed by Business office staff to access the appointment schedule, review it for capacity, inform the Veteran of schedule availability, and then enter the Desired Date as the patient appointment date" and "By entering the Desired Date as the appointment date, the wait time ... appears to be zero days." The Fort Collins clinic is overseen by the Cheyenne, Wyoming, Veterans Affairs office. A coordinator at the Cheyenne office sent an email on June 19, 2013, with instructions on how to manipulate the appointment dates. The coordinator wrote, "Yes, it is gaming the system a bit, but you have to know the rules of the game you are playing."

As of June 23, 2013, the United States Office of Special Counsel is investigating reports that two schedulers at the Fort Collins facility were reassigned to Wyoming after they refused to comply with instructions to falsify information about patient wait times. The VA Office of Medical Inspector has substantiated a report that punitive action was taken against employees who scheduled appointments in a way that honestly showed that appointments would take place outside of the 14-day window, and the OMI also substantiated reports of other problems at the facility such as a shortage of medical providers and attempts to hide evidence of cancelled appointments.

=== Columbia, South Carolina ===
A VA inspector's September 2013 report noted that due to mismanagement, thousands of patients at the VA Medical center in Columbia had their appointments for colon cancer screenings delayed. This resulted in over 50 patients having a delayed diagnosis for colon cancer and some later died from the disease. Additionally, a 2008 report indicated that documents that were critical in the processing of veterans' disability claims had been shredded. Although this had occurred at at least 40 locations nationwide, the Columbia location had the most cases.(1/5 of the overall cases) Also, between 2009 and 2013, the backlog of disability claims in Columbia more than doubled from 33% to 71%.

== Investigations and findings ==
=== Internal VA investigations ===
An audit from the Secretary of Veterans Affairs said, "some front-line, middle, and senior managers felt compelled to manipulate" records to meet performance goals. The manipulation of records was done with the knowledge of senior managers in the Phoenix VA system and possibly those of other VA facilities. Investigations are ongoing as of May 31, 2014.

However, a VA Inspector General's report issued on August 26, 2014, reported that six, not forty, veterans had died experiencing "clinically significant delays" while on waiting lists to see a VA doctor, and in each of these six cases, "we are unable to conclusively assert that the absence of timely quality care caused the deaths of these veterans".

An official report from the VA Inspector General "found that about 1,700 veterans in need of care were 'at risk of being lost or forgotten' after being kept off an official waiting list." Schedulers for the Veterans Health Administration were instructed to change the dates for which veterans had requested an appointment in order to hide delays. At the Phoenix VA, "official data showed (veterans) waited an average of 24 days for an appointment. In reality, the average wait was 115 days." Shinseki called the situation "reprehensible". Former VHA doctors were not surprised by the findings.

At least 1700 veterans at the Phoenix VA who wanted an appointment were never placed on an official wait list. The VA's Office of Inspector General called the manipulation of appointments at the Phoenix VA a "systemic" problem and called for a nationwide audit. As of May 30, 2014, 42 VA medical centers were under investigation for their scheduling practices.

The VA OIG reported in May 2014 that 17 veteran deaths had occurred while waiting for VHA treatment in the Phoenix VA system, and on June 5, 2014, the Acting Secretary of Veterans Affairs, Sloan Gibson, reported that the VA had identified 18 additional deaths. The 18 deaths were among the group of 1700 identified as "at risk of being lost or forgotten". Griffin said that autopsy reports would need to be investigated to determine if the deaths were caused by the delays in treatment.

An internal Veterans Affairs audit released June 9, 2014 found that:

- More than 120,000 veterans were left waiting or never got care.
- Pressures were placed on schedulers to use unofficial lists or engage in inappropriate practices to make waiting times appear more favorable.

An updated audit released June 19 found:

- Tens of thousands more veterans who previously reported waiting more than a month for an appointment
- Disparities between reported wait times and actual wait times

Senator Tom Coburn, (R) Oklahoma, released a year-long investigative report that suggests the number of veterans who died while awaiting delayed care or treatment over the past decade may number as high as one thousand.

=== FBI investigation ===
On June 11, 2014, the Federal Bureau of Investigation opened a criminal investigation of the VA.

=== Congressional investigation ===
On June 20, 2014, the U.S. House Veterans Affairs Committee learned that every one of the 470 senior executives in the VA received performance evaluations that indicated they were at least "fully successful" in each of the past four years. Congressional representatives argued that the data shows that senior management in the VA is out of touch with the problems in the department. Republican Representative Phil Roe said, "Do you think that's normal in business, that nearly every executive is successful? That means you put the bar down here, so anybody can step over it." Democratic Representative Ann McLane Kuster compared the situation to grade inflation. Senior executives were paid a total of $2.4 million in bonus compensation in the most recent year. Gina S. Farrisee, VA assistant secretary for human resources and administration, admitted in her written comments that the department needed to do better at holding executives accountable.

=== Obama Administration investigation ===
President Obama's Deputy Chief of Staff, Rob Nabors, reported to Obama on June 27, 2014, that he found "significant and chronic system failures", a "corrosive culture", damaged morale, and a need for additional staff. He reported that the goals for wait times for appointments of no more than 14 days are unrealistic, that data about patient wait times had been falsified by VHA employees, that there are a variety of problems with safety and integrity within the VHA, and that transparency and accountability are lacking. In response to the report, the Republican chair of the House Veterans Affairs Committee, Representative Jeff Miller, said, "It appears the White House has finally come to terms with the serious and systemic VA health care problems we've been investigating and documenting for years" and that he would work with the White House to fix the problems. The independent chair of the Senate Veterans Affairs Committee, Bernie Sanders, said, "No organization the size of VA can operate effectively without a high level of transparency and accountability. Clearly that is not the case now at the VA."

=== Office of Special Counsel investigations ===
The United States Office of Special Counsel sent a letter to President Obama indicating that the VA Office of Medical Inspector used a "harmless error" defense against allegations of unsafe practices at the VA including unsanitary conditions and delays in treatment. Investigations by the Office of Special Counsel supported claims such as high levels of bacteria at a clinic and an 8-year wait for a VA psychiatric inpatient to receive an initial evaluation. OSC said it is currently reviewing more than 50 allegations of unsafe practices at the VA and has referred 29 cases for further investigation. U.S. Special Counsel Carolyn Lerner wrote in the letter that "These cases are part of a troubling pattern of deficient patient care at VA facilities nationwide, and the continued resistance by the VA, and [Office of Medical Inspector] in most cases, to recognize and address the impact on the health and safety of veterans" and that "veterans' health and safety has been unnecessarily put at risk" by the "harmless error" defense. OSC substantiated numerous claims of unsafe practices at Jackson, Mississippi VA facilities including improper credentialing and illegal prescribing of narcotics. Lerner said that "Despite confirming the problems in each of these (and other) patient-care areas, the VA refused to acknowledge any impact on the health and safety of veterans seeking care."

Acting VA Secretary Sloan Gibson said that he accepted the OSC's recommendations and had directed a review of the Office of Medical Inspector that was to be completed in two weeks. Gibson said "I am deeply disappointed not only in the substantiation of allegations raised by whistleblowers, but also in the failures within VA to take whistleblower complaints seriously."

=== RAND Corporation investigation ===
The Congress commissioned a study of VA by the RAND Corporation, which was published early in 2016. Among the study's findings were: that the care provided by the VA was generally as good as, or better than, other health-care providers (according to most criteria used in the study), and, that there was no widespread evidence of long waiting times generally in the VA (although in a few places some veterans did experience long wait times) and, that most veterans get their appointments within a few days of their preferred date for care. Specifically, more than 90 percent of appointments for already-enrolled patients, and 80 percent of appointments for new patients, occur within two weeks of the desired date.

== Responses ==
=== May and June 2014 ===
Politicians from both Republican and Democratic parties have commented on the scandal. Democratic Representative Steve Israel said that "It's a shame that when Republicans had a chance to help vets get their benefits from the V.A., they blocked a solution", referring to Republican opposition to the 2013 Veterans Backlog Reduction Act. Democrats, led by Senator Patty Murray, have aggressively sought more money for veterans' services since the second term of President George W. Bush. Many Republicans have countered that the problems in the VA are ones of management rather than funding and that Obama Administration officials are responsible for not discovering the patient backlog. Republican Representative Jackie Walorski said that the VA had "bureaucracy run amok" and noted a case in Atlanta where "two top officials were able to retire early and three were reprimanded" over three preventable deaths. At the end of May 2014, bipartisan agreement emerged among Democratic Senator Barbara A. Mikulski and Republican Senator Richard C. Shelby on the Senate Appropriations Committee to include funding for civil and criminal investigations into Veterans Affairs in a veterans spending bill.

Democratic President Barack Obama's chief of staff, Denis McDonough, said on May 18, 2014, that Obama was "madder than hell" about the reports of delays in treatment. McDonough said that "At the same time that we're looking at accountability we want to continue to perform to provide our veterans the services that they have earned."

On May 21, 2014, in a vote of 390–33, the House of Representatives passed the Department of Veterans Affairs Management Accountability Act of 2014 (H.R. 4031; 113th Congress). The bill would give the Secretary of Veterans Affairs the authority to remove or demote any individual from the Senior Executive Service upon determining that such individual's performance warrants removal or demotion. The House members who sponsored the bill argued that, although federal workers can be fired, the process is extremely lengthy, sometimes taking years, and that the officials who are "under scrutiny for neglecting veterans actually received tens of thousands of dollars in bonuses and positive performance reviews". Florida Republican Representative Jeff Miller, who sponsored the bill, said that "this bill would simply give the VA Secretary the authority to fire or demote VA Senior Executive Service employees based on performance, similar to the authority the Secretary of Defense already has to remove military general officers from command or how I am able to fire someone who works for me on my staff."

The United States House of Representatives was also scheduled to consider the bill "Demanding Accountability for Veterans Act of 2013", related to the scandal.

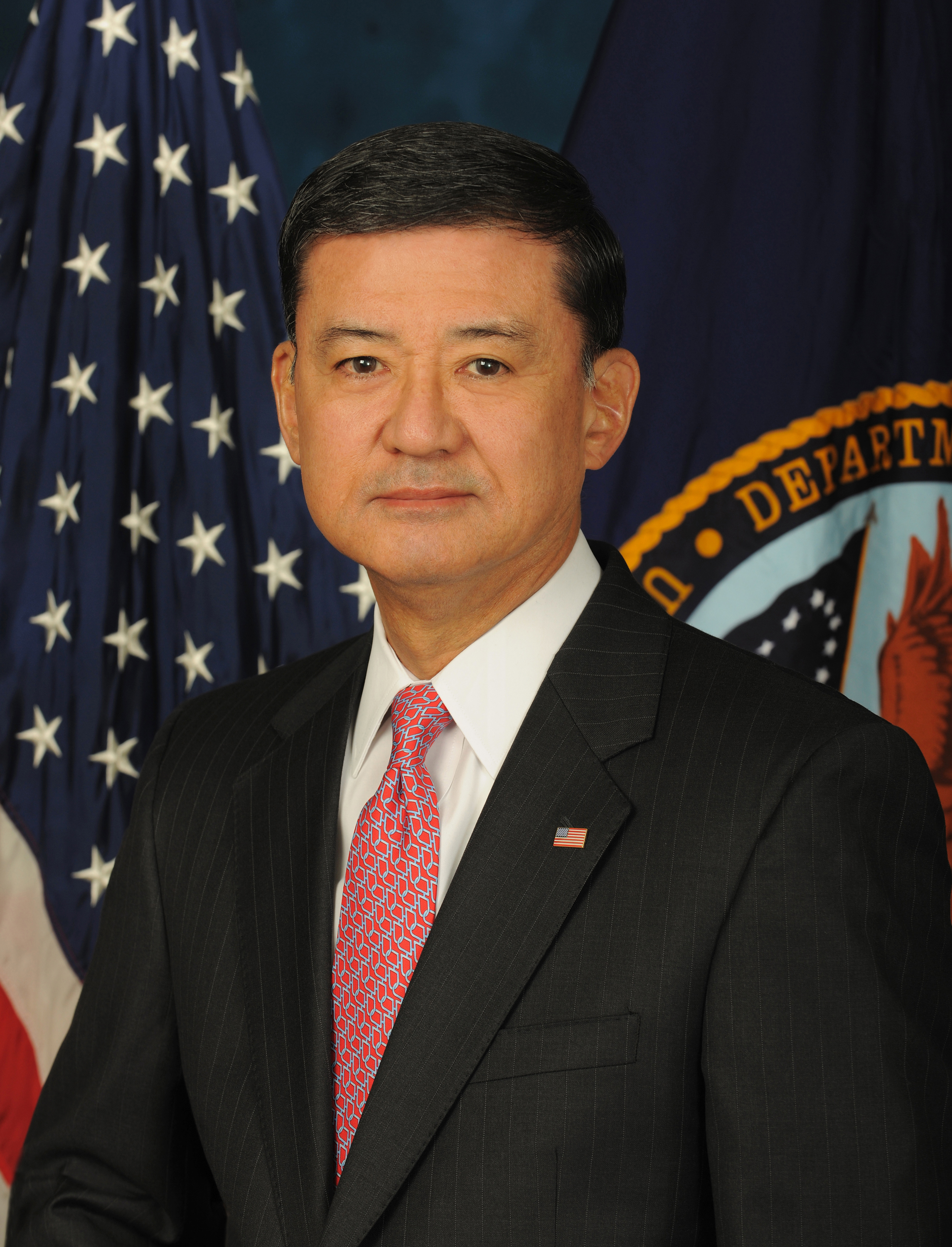
Eric Shinseki, Secretary of Veterans Affairs, resigned on May 30 because of the scandal.

On May 30, 2014, Shinseki apologized and accepted responsibility for the scandal. Later that day he formally resigned as Secretary of Veterans Affairs.

On May 30, 2014, The Hill reported that the Senate was expected to consider legislation related to the VA scandal during the week of June 2, 2014. Their legislation was expected to address both the need to improve the healthcare that was being provided to veterans and the poor management of the Department of Veterans Affairs.

Also on May 30, 2014, the House passed by a 321–87 vote the Commerce, Justice, Science, and Related Agencies Appropriations Act, 2015 (H.R. 4660; 113th Congress) which authorized a $1-million appropriation for a criminal investigation by the Justice Department.

On June 5, 2014, Senator Bernie Sanders, independent of Vermont, and Senator John McCain, Republican of Arizona, announced a bill that would allow veterans who wait for health care for more than 30 days or who live more than 40 miles from a VA facility to instead see private doctors who already provide services through other government programs.

On June 10, 2014, the House voted 426–0 to pass the Veteran Access to Care Act of 2014 (H.R. 4810; 113th Congress), a bill that would allow United States veterans to receive their healthcare from non-VA facilities under certain conditions. The Congressional Budget Office estimated that the bill would cost about $620 million over the 2014–2016 period. Rep. Jeff Miller, who sponsored the bill, said that the wait times veterans were forced to face was "a national disgrace".

On June 11, 2014, the Senate voted 93–3 to pass the Veterans' Access to Care through Choice, Accountability, and Transparency Act of 2014, the bill written by Senators McCain and Sanders to reform the VA. Chairman of the House Committee on Veterans Affairs Jeff Miller said that "many of the provisions included in today's Senate-passed bill are based on ideas that have already cleared the House, so I'm hopeful both chambers of Congress can soon agree on a final package to send to the president's desk." Miller was referring to the House's Veteran Access to Care Act of 2014 (H.R. 4810; 113th Congress) which contained similar provisions and passed the House on June 10, 2014.

Acting VA Secretary Gibson said he plans to fire some VA executives under an expedited process as soon as he is given the authority by Congress to do so.

In late June 2014, VA General Counsel Will Gunn and VA Acting Undersecretary for Health Robert Jesse stepped down from their positions. Other changes in June 2014 included:

- Moving more than $390 million inside the VA budget to fund care for veterans outside the VA system;
- Deploying mobile VA medical units;
- Ending the goal of providing appointments within the 14-day window that Nabors criticized as unrealistic and said may have "incentivized inappropriate actions";
- Posting twice-monthly public updates of VA wait times;
- Banning performance bonuses;
- Removing some senior managers from the Phoenix VA system;
- Leadership emphasis on protecting whistleblowers from retaliation.

=== July 2014 ===
==== Appointment of Robert A. McDonald ====
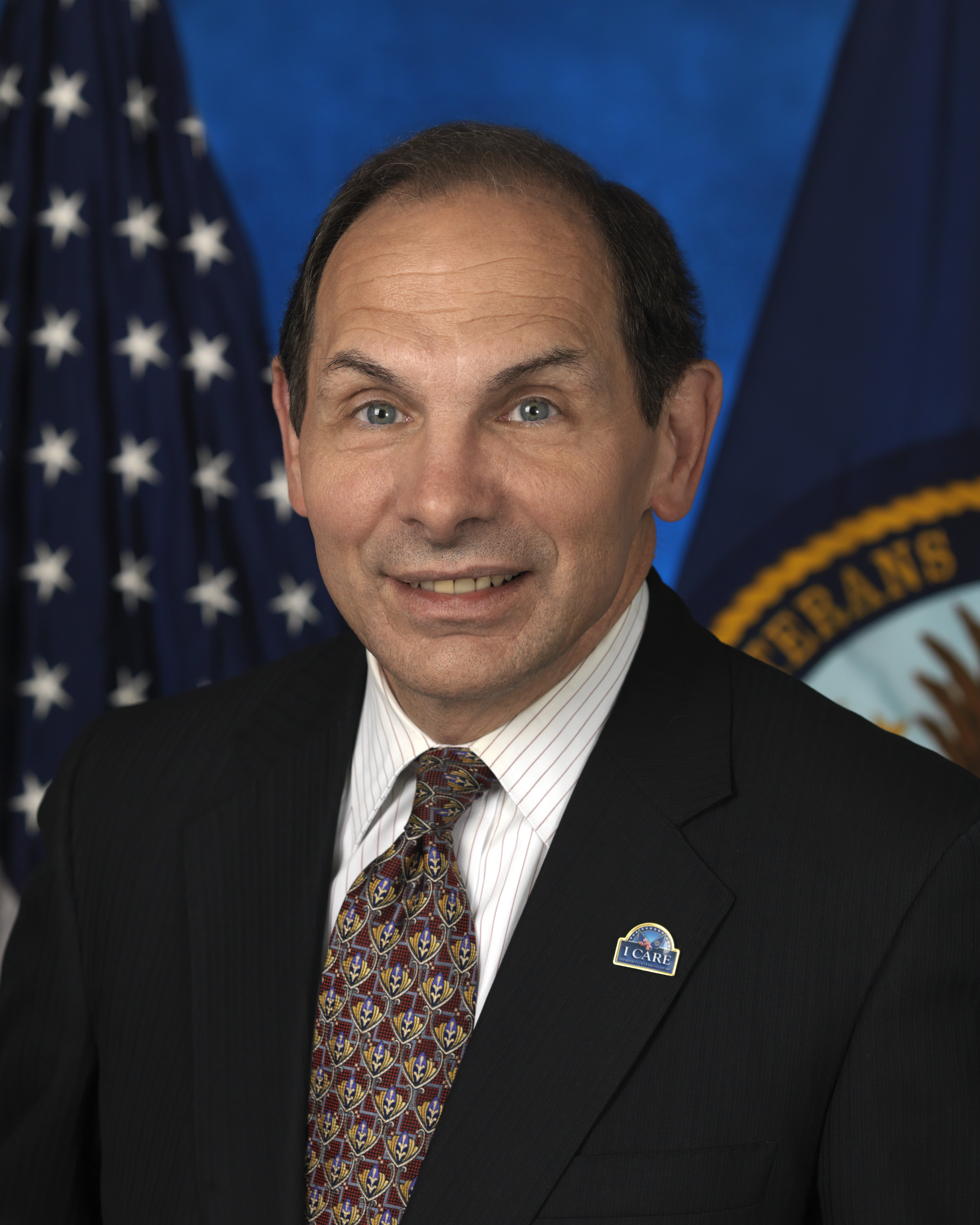
Robert A. McDonald replaced Shinseki as Secretary of Veterans Affairs.

President Obama nominated former Procter and Gamble CEO and US Army veteran Robert A. McDonald as the permanent replacement for Shinseki as Secretary of Veterans Affairs. Paul Rieckhoff, CEO of Iraq and Afghanistan Veterans of America, said that "If the president doesn't make VA a priority, Superman can't do this job." House Speaker John Boehner and American Legion national commander Daniel Dellinger also commented that new VA secretary would need Obama's support to make changes in the VA.

McDonald was sworn into office on July 30, 2014. His first message to VA employees stressed the importance of integrity.

==== Legislation passed in Congress ====
The Veterans' Access to Care through Choice, Accountability, and Transparency Act of 2014 was passed by the House and Senate before their August recess to add $16 billion in supplemental funding for the VA, with $10 billion for allowing some Veterans to receive private medical care at taxpayer expense, and $6 billion for increasing the number of VA staff. The Act also gives the VA Secretary expanded authority to fire managers who perform poorly, and authorized the VA to lease additional facilities.

=== August 2014 ===
Sloan Gibson, who had been Acting Secretary between the time of Shinseki's resignation and McDonald's taking office, is now Deputy Secretary. He said on August 6, 2014, that more punishments were planned for VA officials for their roles in the scandal. The VA announced the week prior to Gibson's statement that two supervisors would be fired and four other employees would be disciplined for their roles in falsifying data in Colorado and Wyoming. The VA previously announced plans to fire three executives at the Phoenix VA. "These were the first in what I expect will be a long series of announcements of personnel actions," said Gibson.

On August 7, Obama signed the VA funding and reform legislation in a ceremony at Fort Belvoir, an Army installation in the State of Virginia. "This bill covers a lot of ground, from expanding survivor benefits and educational opportunities, to improving care for veterans struggling with traumatic brain injury and for victims of sexual assault," said Obama, and gives the VA Secretary "more authority to hold people accountable... so that he can move quickly to remove senior executives who fail to meet the standards of conduct and competence that the American people demand."

As of August 15, VA data showed that the number of veterans who were waiting more than three months for an appointment has declined by half since Spring 2014, but the number who wait at least 30 days remains similar. Reported wait times for repeat patients have increased from 3.5 days to nearly 6 days. The VA paid for nearly 200,000 veterans to see private doctors, and average wait time to see a primary care doctor decreased from 51 to 43 days.

August 26, 2014, Obama announces 19 sweeping executive actions aimed at improving access to quality VA healthcare, increasing mental health services, eliminating veteran homelessness and ensuring service members have the employment and education resources necessary to assist with their transition out of the military.

=== September 2014 ===
At a Senate hearing on September 9, 2014, Acting VA Inspector General Richard J. Griffin reported that investigations are continuing into the Phoenix VA, including a review of "possible criminal misconduct by VA senior hospital leadership". Griffin also reported that "Since July 2005, OIG published 20 oversight reports on VA patient wait times and access to care yet VHA did not effectively address its access to care issues or stop the use of inappropriate scheduling procedures. When VHA concurred with our recommendations and submitted an action plan, VA medical facility directors did not take the necessary actions to comply with VHA's program directives and policy changes." In his spoken testimony, Griffin said that in "three-fourths (of the VA facilities investigated for falsification of wait time data), we're pretty confident that it was knowingly and willingly happening, and we're pursuing those." He also said he hopes to complete his office's investigations into possible criminal misconduct by the end of 2014. If his office finds criminal misconduct, it will then refer cases to U.S. attorneys for possible prosecution. Senator Richard Burr said that the "culture that has developed at VA and the lack of management and accountability is simply reprehensible." In his testimony, Secretary Bob McDonald apologized "to all Veterans who experienced unacceptable delays in receiving care at the Phoenix facility, and across the country. We at VA are committed to fixing the problems and consistently providing the high quality care our Veterans have earned and deserve in order to improve their health and well-being." He discussed actions taken at the Phoenix VA facility in response to Inspector General findings, and he discussed national initiatives to change VA's culture, measure patient satisfaction, improve access to care, and improve accountability (including a restructuring of the Office of Medical Inspector).

On September 18, 2014, VA published the Federal Register its intention to increase the annual salaries of new physicians and dentists by up to $35,000 as part of a nationwide recruitment effort to hire more doctors and improve veterans' access to care. The notice was to take effect on November 30. VA Secretary Bob McDonald said the department needs new doctors, nurses and clinicians for 28,000 jobs authorized by Congress in the 2014 Veterans Access, Choice and Accountability Act.

At a House Veterans Affairs Committee hearing on September 18, Griffin said that delays at the Phoenix VA "contributed to" but did not "cause" the deaths of veterans, an assertion that was challenged by Committee members. Another witness at the hearing, Dr. Sam Foote, said that "This report is at best a whitewash and at worst a feeble attempt at a cover-up", and alleged that the report omitted information about 293 veterans who died waiting for healthcare. Foote also faulted McDonald for allegedly not increasing VA's transparency as he had promised.

=== October 2014 ===
On October 7, the VA announced that it was firing four additional employees, subject to the results of appeals. Deputy Secretary Gibson said that "VA will actively and aggressively pursue disciplinary action on those who violates our values. There should be no doubt that when we discover evidence of wrongdoing, we will hold employees accountable."

- The director of the Pittsburgh VA is being fired for "conduct unbecoming a Senior Executive" after an outbreak of Legionnaires' disease in 2012 and a subsequent investigation. "VA officials knew about problems and dangers with the medical center's water system, but did not disclose that information for almost a year."
- The director of the Dublin, Georgia VA is being fired after "the hospital's staff closed out more than 1,500 patient appointments to hide long wait times."
- The director of the central Alabama VA system is being fired after a variety of problems were found by the VA Inspector General, including long wait times that some schedulers were instructed to conceal.
- The Deputy Chief Procurement Officer is being fired. According to the Inspector General, she "improperly disclosed non-public VA information to unauthorized persons, misused her position and VA resources for private gain, and engaged in a prohibited personnel practice."

Rep. Jeff Miller, Republican, of Florida, chairs the House Veterans Affairs Committee. He said that the new VA law gives agency officials five days to respond to notices of intent to fire them. The director of the Georgia VA retired four days in advance of VA's announcement that he would be fired, and the procurement official also retired in advance of her firing. The procurement official was nearly hired by the U.S. Department of Energy before that department learned of the findings against her at the VA. Miller said that "If any current laws or regulations are impeding the (VA)'s ability to swiftly hold employees accountable, VA leaders must work with Congress so those laws and regulations can be changed", and "VA appears to be giving failing executives an opportunity to quit, retire or find new jobs without consequence." He said he opposed allowing officials who had committed misconduct being allowed to "slip out the back door with a pension".

=== November 2014 ===
The official in charge of the Phoenix VA facility, who had been on administrative leave for almost seven months, was fired. While on administrative leave, she was paid over $90,000. Rep. Kyrsten Sinema, D-Ariz, said that the payments were "a completely unacceptable use of taxpayer dollars that should instead go to providing care for veterans". Dr. Sam Foote said that the firing was "a good first step" and that "I think there are a lot of others who need to follow her out the door."

The VA temporarily appointed a new manager for the southwest region of the United States. The southwest region includes the Phoenix VA facility. The new manager was previously involved in clandestinely placing a camera inside the hospital room of a patient in Florida. She later said that the manner of the camera's placement was "wrong". The Republic reported that "(she) at first said she authorized the videotaping because nurses were upset and wanted to prove family members were committing medical sabotage. Moments later, she said there was no intention to keep the filming secret from the Carnegies, and the camera was really approved for patient safety." She said that she has previously been assigned to problematic hospitals during her career, including those with ethics violations or financial problems, and has been successful at fixing the problems.

=== February 2015 ===
Secretary McDonald made two controversial statements in February.

On a February 15, 2015 airing of Meet the Press, McDonald claimed that 60 U.S. Department of Veterans Affairs employees had been fired due to the VA's wait time scandal. Later, he backtracked and clarified it was only 8 employees that lost their jobs. On February 23, 2015, McDonald admitted he misspoke to a homeless veteran on January 30, 2015, about his serving in the U.S. Army special forces, a conversation that was recorded by a CBS television news crew accompanying him during a nationwide count of homeless veterans. "I have no excuse, I was not in the special forces" he told The Huffington Post, which first broke the story. The Huffington Post reported that "special operations forces" includes the Army Rangers and that McDonald "...completed Army Ranger training and took courses in jungle, arctic and desert warfare" and "...While he earned a Ranger Tab designating him as a graduate of Ranger School, he never served in a Ranger battalion or any other special operations unit."

=== April 2015 ===
The New York Times reported that in contrast to previous statements about the number of firings related to the scandal "new internal documents show that the real number of people removed from their jobs is much smaller still: at most, three". The Department of Veterans Affairs did not dispute this number, but said that disciplinary action is being taken against over 100 other employees. Congressional Republicans were outraged. Representative Jeff Miller said. "Rather than disciplining bad employees, V.A. often just transfers them to other V.A. facilities or puts them on paid leave for months on end," and "Everyone knows accountability is a major problem at the department." Miller said that he would introduce new legislation to hasten the firing process. Raymond Kelley, legislative director for Veterans of Foreign Wars, said that "The government firing system is so cumbersome bad employees can continue to be paid for years," and "We need to show them you can no longer hide just because you have a government job, unclog the middle management that appears to be part of the problem and get the right people in those positions."

=== April 2017 ===
On April 27, 2017 President Trump signed Executive Order 13793, titled "Improving Accountability and Whistleblower Protection at the Department of Veterans Affairs."

== Comments from management experts, health care experts, and economists ==
Management experts said that the source of the problem was setting an unrealistic goal of a 14-day wait. This was compounded by not including provisions for measuring how well the system was working. Experts said that having high-stakes goals, especially without checks and balances, encouraged "gaming the numbers" and cheating, in the private and public sector. Managers at the Federal level should have had data about times and costs for basic services throughout the VA system. That would have identified the Phoenix facility as anomalous.

Dr. Robert Roswell, a previous VA Undersecretary of Health and now Professor of Medicine at the University of Oklahoma, said that an appropriate measure of VHA performance was not patient wait times, which were largely outside the control of the staff, because VHA employees do not control the number of patients seeking care. A better measure of performance, would for example, measure the efficient use of VHA resources, such as the number of no-show appointments.

Phillip Longman, author of "Best Care Anywhere: Why VA Care Would Work Better for Everyone," said after visiting VA hospitals nationwide that, as the result of veterans in New England, the Mid-Atlantic and the industrial midwest either dying or retiring to Sunbelt states, there is an imbalance of capacity, with empty beds in some VHA hospitals and waiting lists in others. Compounding this problem, more liberal eligibility standards allow veterans to get treatment for chronic conditions of aging like heart disease and Parkinson's.

"Setting a benchmark of 14 days to see a new primary care doc at a VA hospital or clinic in Boston or Northern California may be completely reasonable," wrote Longman. "But trying to do the same in Phoenix and in a handful of other sunbelt retirement meccas is not workable without Congress ponying up for building more capacity there."

Economics Nobel laureate Paul Krugman said that the scandal came about because conservatives did not like the fact that the VHA system, which is "an island of socialized medicine", is working well, so they seized on wait times as "a gift from God" to discredit the VHA.... "It's still true that Veterans Affairs provides excellent care, at low cost," ... "Those waiting lists arise partly because so many veterans want care, but Congress has provided neither clear guidelines on who is entitled to coverage, nor sufficient resources to cover all applicants. And, yes, some officials appear to have responded to incentives to reduce waiting times by falsifying data."..."Yet, on average, veterans don't appear to wait longer for care than other Americans," ... "And does anyone doubt that many Americans have died while waiting for approval from private insurers?

== See also ==
- Walter Reed Army Medical Center neglect scandal
- Merit Pay § Federal Government Merit Pay
- Pay-for-Performance (Federal Government)
