= Civil Service in early India =

During 313 BC, in the Mauryan period Kautilya created the treatise called Kautilya Arthashastra. He laid down the qualifications for appointments of civil servants.

During 1000–1600 AD, in the medieval period, Akbar the Great nurtured the civil service. It was during his period there was initiation of land reforms and established the land revenue system which later formed to become the constituent of the Indian taxation system.

== Examinations ==
- Dhauta Pariksha
- Ratna Pariksha
- Shadyantra Pariksha
- Shalaka Pariksha

== See also ==
- Imperial examination (Civil service in imperial China)

== Sources ==
- Mubarak, Abu al-Fazl ibn (1978), The A'in-I Akbari : an encyclopaedia of Hindu philosophy, science, literature and customs, with the life of the author and Akbar's wise sayings, vol. 3, translator: Jarrett, H. S, revised and further annotated by Jadunath Sarkar, New Delhi: Oriental Books Reprint Corporation
- Asiatic Society (Calcutta, and Bengal) (1848), Bibliotheca Indica, vol. 270, Calcutta, India: Asiatic Society
