= Seasonal bonuses (Japan) =

Seasonal bonuses are paid twice yearly in Japan to salaried workers. It is generally referred to as a ボーナス (bōnasu) The summer bonus is called 夏期賞与 (kaki shōyo) by companies and 夏期一時金 (kaki ichijikin) by unions. It is paid in June or July. The winter bonus is called 冬期賞与 (tōki shōyo) by companies and 冬期一時金 (tōki ichijikin) by unions and is paid in December.

The bonus amount varies from company to company and from year to year, but is generally several months' salary. For example, the 2012 summer bonuses for Japan Airlines employees were equivalent to two months' pay, while All Nippon Airways paid the equivalent of six weeks' pay. As reflected by the different Japanese naming above, while workers effectively consider it to be part of their salary, from the perspective of employers it is contingent on the company performing well, and can be reduced or cut more easily than salaries if the employer considers it necessary. For example, the June 2009 bonuses, during the 2008 financial crisis, were a 19% year-on-year drop according to the Japan Business Federation.

== 2012 bonuses ==
In the June 2012 bonus period, according to a survey of wives, their husbands' average after-tax summer bonus fell 65,000 yen from a year earlier to 611,000 yen, the lowest since the survey began in 2003, according to Sompo Japan DIY Insurance Company. According to a Japan Business Federation (Keidanren) survey of summer bonuses, summer bonuses at 160 companies fell by 2.55 to 771,040. Summer bonuses fell in 12 industries, including steel (12.48%), electronics (5.35%), and the auto industry (3.15%).

According to the Ministry of Health, Labour and Welfare said that summer bonuses were down for the second straight year, falling 1.4% from 2011. On average the summer bonus was ¥358,368 according to the ministry's figures.

As both seasonal bonuses are generally negotiated between management and labor at the same time, the 2012 winter bonuses were also expected to fall.

This was proven to be correct, with the winter bonuses falling for the first time in three years. They fell 3.99% from a year earlier to ¥781,396 on average for union member at 83 major companies surveyed by Keidanren. The fall was the third-largest ever. National government workers were paid a bonus of ¥565,300, down 8.4% or ¥51.800 under a temporary special law. The civil servant's total annual bonus averaged ¥1.08 million over the year, down 29% from the record ¥1.53 million they received in fiscal 1998.

== 2013 bonuses ==
In 2013 nearly 40% of employees received a larger bonuses than in 2012, according to a survey by Nippon Life Insurance Company. 48.8% said their bonus was the same, and 11% said that it decreased. The average bonus size was ¥559,000 up ¥64,000 from 2012.
