= List of Department of Veterans Affairs appointments by Joe Biden =

Below is a list of nominations and appointments to the Department of Veterans Affairs by Joe Biden, the 46th president of the United States. As of July 1, 2024, according to tracking by The Washington Post and Partnership for Public Service, 8 nominees have been confirmed, 0 nominees are being considered by the Senate, 4 positions do not have a nominee, and 2 appointments have been made that do not require Senate confirmation.

== Color key ==
Denotes appointees awaiting Senate confirmation.

Denotes appointees serving in an acting capacity.

Denotes appointees who have left office or offices which have been disbanded.

== Appointments ==
Office	Nominee	Assumed office	Left office
— Secretary of Veterans Affairs	Denis McDonough	February 9, 2021 (Confirmed February 8, 2021, 87–7)	—
— Deputy Secretary of Veterans Affairs	Tanya J. Bradsher	September 20, 2023 (Confirmed September 12, 2023, 50–46)	—
— Deputy Secretary of Veterans Affairs	Donald Remy	July 19, 2021 (Confirmed July 15, 2021, 91–8)	April 1, 2023
— General Counsel	Richard Sauber	May 3, 2021 (Confirmed April 29, 2021 by voice vote)	June 2022 Hired by the White House
— Under Secretary of Veterans Affairs (Benefits)	Joshua Jacobs	April 26, 2023 (Confirmed April 26, 2023, 74–25)	—
— Under Secretary of Veterans Affairs (Health)	Shereef Elnahal	July 21, 2022 (Confirmed July 21, 2022, 66–23)	—
— Under Secretary of Veterans Affairs (Memorial Affairs)	Matthew T. Quinn	June 23, 2021 (Confirmed June 17, 2021 by voice vote)	May 23, 2024
— Assistant Secretary of Veterans Affairs (Accountability and Whistleblower Protection)	Maryanne Donaghy	July 2, 2021 (Confirmed June 24, 2021 by voice vote)	January 2024
— Assistant Secretary of Veterans Affairs (Congressional and Legislative Affairs)	Patricia Ross	July 7, 2021 (Confirmed June 24, 2021 by voice vote)	—
— Assistant Secretary of Veterans Affairs (Enterprise Integration)	Guy Kiyokawa	November 4, 2021 (Confirmed October 28, 2021 by voice vote)	—
— Assistant Secretary of Veterans Affairs (Human Resources / Operations, Security and Preparedness)	Gina Grosso	June 23, 2021	January 1, 2024
— Assistant Secretary of Veterans Affairs (Information and Technology)	Kurt DelBene	January 13, 2022 (Confirmed December 16, 2021 by voice vote)	—
— Assistant Secretary of Veterans Affairs (Public and Intergovernmental Affairs)	Brenda Sue Fulton	July 1, 2022	January 2024
— Assistant Secretary of Veterans Affairs (Public and Intergovernmental Affairs)	Kayla M. Williams	January 20, 2021	June 17, 2022
Board of Veterans' Appeals
— Chairman of the Board of Veterans' Appeals	Jaime Areizaga-Soto	September 15, 2022 (Confirmed August 4, 2022 by voice vote)	—

== Withdrawn nominations ==
Office	Nominee	Nominated	Withdrawn	Notes
— Under Secretary of Veterans Affairs (Benefits)	Ray Jefferson	March 9, 2022	July 11, 2022	
— General Counsel	Anjali Chaturvedi	June 22, 2022	January 3, 2024	Nomination not resent

== See also ==
- Cabinet of Joe Biden, for the vetting process undergone by top-level roles including advice and consent by the Senate
- List of executive branch 'czars' e.g. Special Advisor to the President

== Notes ==
Confirmation votes

Confirmations by roll call vote

Confirmations by voice vote
