= Dat Tran =

American civil servant

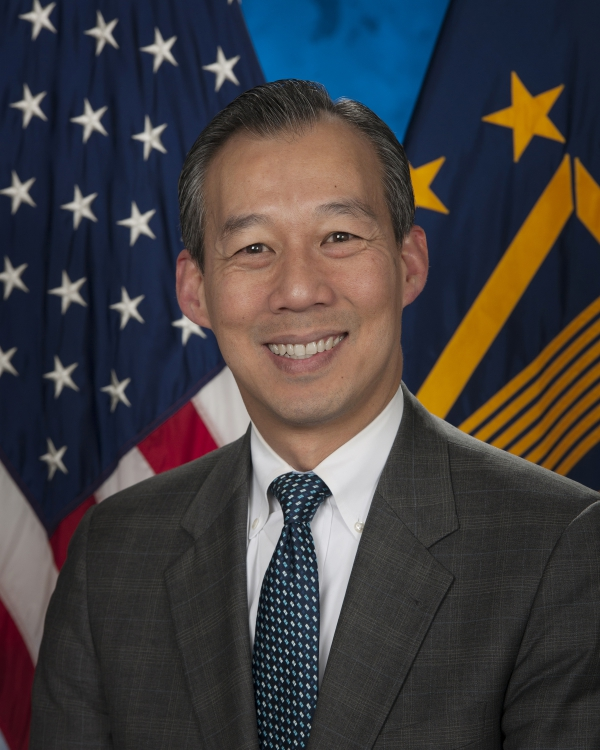
- Tran in 2021

United States Secretary of Veterans Affairs
- Acting; January 20, 2021 – February 9, 2021
- President: Joe Biden
- Deputy: Carolyn M. Clancy (acting)
- Preceded by: Robert Wilkie
- Succeeded by: Denis McDonough

United States Assistant Secretary of Veterans Affairs for Enterprise Integration
- Acting; January 20, 2021 – November 4, 2021
- President: Joe Biden
- Preceded by: Melissa Sue Glynn
- Succeeded by: Guy Kiyokawa

Personal details
- Born: Vietnam
- Education: Ohio State University (BS)

Dat P. Tran is an American civil servant who served as the principal deputy assistant secretary for the United States Department of Veterans Affairs' Office of Enterprise Integration and was the acting United States Secretary of Veterans Affairs from January 20 to February 9, 2021.

== Early life and education ==
Tran was born in Vietnam. His family settled in Ohio and he graduated from Ohio State University with a degree in industrial systems engineering.

== Career ==
Tran worked for Square D Power Company in Milwaukee, Wisconsin.

He worked for the Senate Veterans Affairs Committee from 1995 to 2001.

On January 20, 2021, following the inauguration of President Joe Biden, Tran was selected to act as interim United States secretary of veterans affairs, pending the confirmation of nominee Denis McDonough by the United States Senate.

Political offices
Preceded by Robert Wilkie	United States Secretary of Veterans Affairs; Acting; 2021	Succeeded by Denis McDonough
