= H.R. 1405 (113th Congress) =

- Long title: To amend title 38, United States Code, to require the Secretary of Veterans Affairs to include a notice of disagreement form in any notice of decision issued for the denial of a benefit sought, to improve the supervision of fiduciaries of veterans under the laws administered by the Secretary of Veterans Affairs, and for other purposes.
- Announced in: the 113th United States Congress
- Sponsored by: Rep. Dina Titus (D, NV-1)
- Number of co-sponsors: 1

Legislative history
- Introduced in the House as H.R. 1405 by Rep. Dina Titus (D, NV-1) on March 25, 2013; Committee consideration by United States House Committee on Veterans' Affairs, United States House Veterans' Affairs Subcommittee on Disability Assistance and Memorial Affairs; Passed the House on October 28, 2013 (voice vote)

H.R. 1405 is a bill "to amend title 38, United States Code, to require the Secretary of Veterans Affairs to include a notice of disagreement form in any notice of decision issued for the denial of a benefit sought, to improve the supervision of fiduciaries of veterans under the laws administered by the Secretary of Veterans Affairs, and for other purposes." It was introduced into the United States House of Representatives during the 113th United States Congress.

H.R. 1405 would require the Department of Veterans Affairs to include the appropriate appeals form whenever they reject a veteran's benefit claim. The bill would also set up a way for state or local government agencies to gain view-only access to the case-tracking system so that they could help veterans with completing their claims. The bill also outlines the rules under which the VA may assign, monitor, and interact with people acting on the behalf of a veteran - his or her fiduciary. Finally, the bill reduced from $400 million to $345 million the cap on the total amount of money that can be given out in bonuses each year to VA employees.

== Provisions of the bill ==
This summary is based largely on the summary provided by the Congressional Research Service, a public domain source.

Section one of the bill would direct the Secretary of Veterans Affairs (VA) to include, within a notification to a claimant of the decision to deny a benefit sought, a form that may be used to file a notice of disagreement to such decision.

Section two would honor as a veteran any person who is entitled to retired pay for nonregular (reserve) service or who would be so entitled, but for age. The bill would provide that such a person shall not be entitled to any benefit by reason of such recognition.

Section three of the bill would direct the Secretary to provide veterans' case-tracking information access to employees of a state or local governmental agency assisting veterans with benefit claims. The bill would direct the Secretary to ensure that such access does not: (1) allow the employee to modify the data in the case-tracking system, or (2) include access to medical records. The bill would require such employees to complete a certification course on privacy issues before receiving such access.

Section four of the bill would authorize the Secretary of Veterans Affairs (VA) to appoint one or more temporary fiduciaries for up to 120 days when a temporary fiduciary is needed to protect the benefits of a VA beneficiary while a determination of incompetency is being made or appealed or a fiduciary is appealing a determination of misuse. The bill would require the Secretary to provide a written statement to a beneficiary determined by the Secretary to be mentally incompetent for purposes of appointing a fiduciary. The bill would allow the beneficiary to appeal such determination. It would also allow a beneficiary for whom the Secretary appoints a fiduciary to, at any time, request the Secretary to remove such fiduciary and appoint a new one. The bill would require the Secretary to comply with any such request made in good faith. The bill would prohibit any such removal or new appointment from delaying or interrupting the beneficiary's receipt of benefits. The bill would require an appointed fiduciary to act independently of the VA and in the interests of the beneficiary.

The bill would provide for the predesignation of a fiduciary. The bill would require the Secretary, if a beneficiary does not designate a fiduciary, to appoint a fiduciary who is a relative, a guardian, or authorized to act on their behalf under a durable power of attorney. The bill would provide for: (1) fiduciary commissions when necessary; and (2) the temporary payment of benefits to a person having custody and control of an incompetent or minor beneficiary, to be used solely for the benefit of the beneficiary.

The bill would direct the Secretary to maintain a list of state and local agencies and nonprofit social service agencies that are qualified to act as a fiduciary.

The bill would require any certification of a fiduciary to be made on the basis of an inquiry or investigation of his or her fitness and qualifications. It would require the investigation to include a face-to-face interview and a background check. The bill would allow a person convicted of a federal or state offense to serve as a fiduciary only when the Secretary finds such person to be appropriate under the circumstances. The bill would require each fiduciary to disclose the number of beneficiaries that the fiduciary acts on behalf of. The bill would require the Secretary to: (1) maintain records of any person who has had his or her fiduciary status revoked, and (2) notify the beneficiary within 14 days after learning that the fiduciary has been convicted of a crime.

The bill would direct the Secretary, upon having reason to believe that a fiduciary may be misusing all or part of a beneficiary benefit, to: (1) conduct a thorough investigation, and (2) report results to the Attorney General and the head of each federal department or agency that pays a beneficiary benefit to such fiduciary. The bill would require each Veterans Benefits Administration regional office to maintain specified fiduciary information.

The bill would require (current law permits) a fiduciary to file an annual accounting of the administration of beneficiary benefits. It would also require the Secretary to conduct annual random audits of fiduciaries who receive a commission for such service. The bill would require: (1) fiduciary repayment of misused benefits, and (2) a report from the Secretary to the congressional veterans committees on the implementation of this section.

Finally, section five prohibits the Secretary from paying more than $345 million in VA employee awards or bonuses during each of FY2014-FY2018.

== Congressional Budget Office report ==
This summary is based largely on the summary provided by the Congressional Budget Office, as ordered reported by the House Committee on Veterans’ Affairs on May 8, 2013. This is a public domain source.

H.R. 1405 would make changes to certain administrative procedures and programs of the Department of Veterans Affairs (VA), including the fiduciary program, access to case-tracking information, and limits on bonuses for employees. The Congressional Budget Office (CBO) estimates that implementing H.R. 1405 would yield net discretionary savings of $108 million over the 2014-2018 period, assuming appropriation actions consistent with the bill. Pay-as-you-go procedures do not apply to this legislation because it would not affect direct spending or revenues. H.R. 1405 contains no intergovernmental or private-sector mandates as defined in the Unfunded Mandates Reform Act (UMRA).

== Procedural history ==
=== House ===
H.R. 1405 was introduced into the House on March 25, 2013 by Rep. Dina Titus (D, NV-1). It was referred to the United States House Committee on Veterans' Affairs and the United States House Veterans' Affairs Subcommittee on Disability Assistance and Memorial Affairs. The bill was reported (amended) by the Committee on Veterans' Affairs alongside House Report 113-130 on June 25, 2013. On October 25, 2013, House Majority Leader Eric Cantor announced that H.R. 1742 would be on the House schedule for the week of October 28, 2013. It was scheduled for a vote on October 28, 2013 under a suspension of the rules. The House was expected to deal with six different bills related to Veterans all on the same day, including this bill. The House did vote on October 28, 2013 in a voice vote to pass the bill.

== Debate and discussion ==
Supporters of the bill indicated that the reduction in funds to be spent on bonuses by the VA was "needed in light of the management failures of the VA, such as the backlog of veterans claims." The committee report indicated that there were concerns in Congress about the "VA's provision of merit-based bonuses to managers and supervisors who have led troubled offices, including Veterans Health Administration medical centers with demonstrated incidences of gross negligence in care, and VBA positions where a growing inventory of claims and poor workload management practices abound."

== See also ==
- List of bills in the 113th United States Congress
- Fiduciary
