= Robert Wilkie =

10th United States Secretary of Veterans Affairs (born 1962)

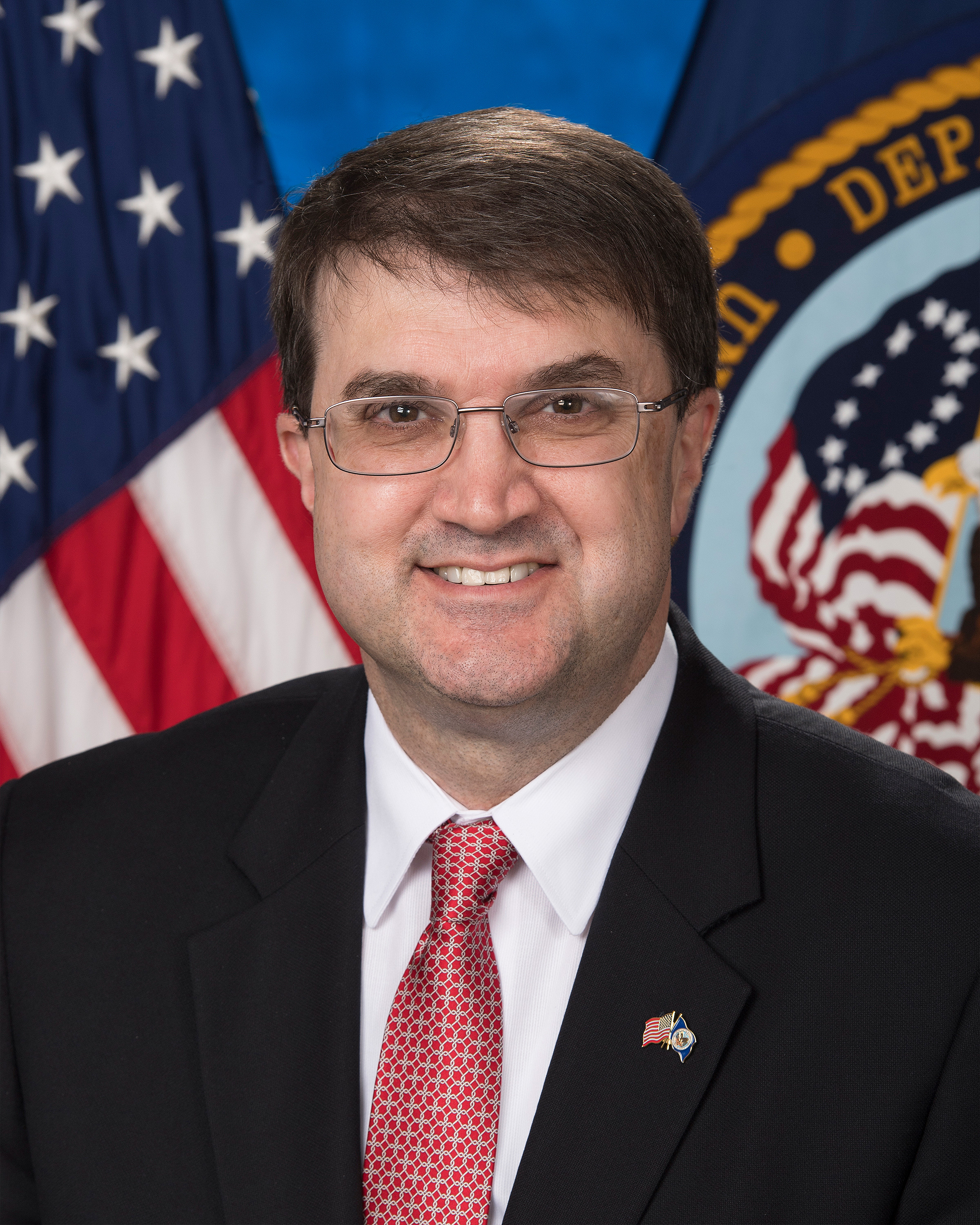
- Official portrait, 2018

10th United States Secretary of Veterans Affairs
- In office July 30, 2018 – January 20, 2021
- President: Donald Trump
- Deputy: James Byrne; Pamela J. Powers (acting)
- Preceded by: David Shulkin
- Succeeded by: Denis McDonough
- Acting; March 28, 2018 – May 29, 2018
- President: Donald Trump
- Deputy: Thomas G. Bowman
- Preceded by: David Shulkin
- Succeeded by: Peter O'Rourke (acting)

8th Under Secretary of Defense for Personnel and Readiness
- In office November 30, 2017 – July 30, 2018
- President: Donald Trump
- Preceded by: Jessica L. Wright
- Succeeded by: Matthew Donovan

25th Assistant Secretary of Defense for Legislative Affairs
- In office January 31, 2006 – January 19, 2009; Acting: January 31, 2006 – September 29, 2006
- President: George W. Bush
- Preceded by: Dan Stanley
- Succeeded by: Elizabeth King

Personal details
- Born: Robert Leon Wilkie Jr. August 2, 1962 (age 64) Frankfurt, West Germany (now Germany)
- Party: Republican
- Spouse: Julia Wilkie
- Education: Wake Forest University (BA); Loyola University New Orleans (JD); Georgetown University (LLM); United States Army War College (MS)

Military service
- Allegiance: United States
- Branch/service: United States Navy; United States Navy Reserve; United States Air Force; United States Air Force Reserve
- Rank: Colonel

Robert Leon Wilkie Jr. (born August 2, 1962) is an American lawyer and government official who served as the 10th United States secretary of veterans affairs from 2018 to 2021, during the first Trump administration. He was previously Under Secretary of Defense for Personnel and Readiness from November 2017 to July 2018. A Naval intelligence officer in the Reserve, he was Assistant Secretary of Defense for Legislative Affairs in the administration of President George W. Bush.

== Early life and education ==
Wilkie was born in Frankfurt, West Germany, and attended Salisbury Cathedral School in England and Reid Ross High School in Fayetteville, North Carolina. The son of a career Army artillery officer, he grew up in Fort Bragg, North Carolina.

Wilkie received his B.A. degree from Wake Forest University in North Carolina. He received a J.D. degree from Loyola University School of Law in New Orleans in 1988 and an LL.M. degree in international and comparative law from Georgetown University Law Center in Washington, D.C.

Wilkie served in the United States Navy Reserve; he is currently in the United States Air Force Reserve, where he holds the rank of Colonel.

== Career ==
=== Congressional staffer and George W. Bush administration official ===
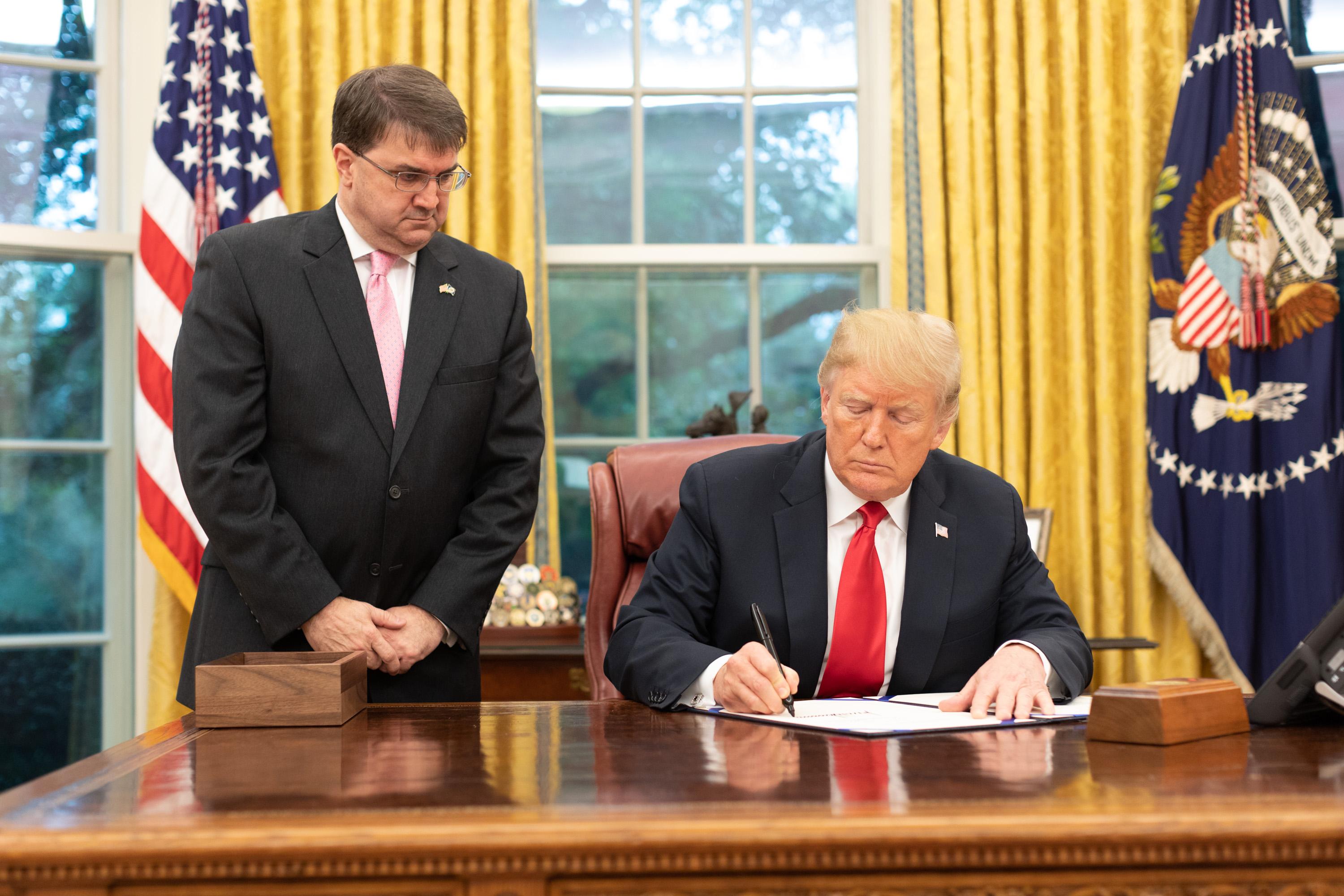
Wilkie watches as President Trump signs the Veterans Treatment Court Improvement Act of 2018.

Wilkie was a longtime Republican congressional staffer. He began his career on Capitol Hill as counsel to Senator Jesse Helms of North Carolina, and later became legislative director for Representative David Funderburk.

In 1996, Wilkie unsuccessfully sought the Republican nomination in North Carolina's 7th congressional district. He was later the executive director of the North Carolina Republican Party during Helms' reelection attempt against Democratic challenger Harvey Gantt.

Wilkie then returned to Capitol Hill as counsel and advisor on international security affairs to Senate Majority Leader Trent Lott from 1997 to 2003. In that role, Wilkie led negotiations on the post-September 11 authorization for the use of military force and worked to defeat U.S. ratification of the Comprehensive Nuclear-Test-Ban Treaty.

From 2003 to 2005, in the George W. Bush administration, Wilkie was special assistant to the president for national security affairs and a senior director of the National Security Council. He was a senior policy advisor to then-National Security Advisor Condoleezza Rice as well as her successor, Stephen Hadley. He later moved to the Pentagon, where in 2007, as assistant secretary of defense for legislative affairs, Wilkie authored a memo outlining guidelines that limited which Defense Department personnel could testify to Congress. Wilkie's memo directed that only highest-ranking officers and presidentially appointed civilians could offer congressional testimony, barring all field-grade officers and enlisted personnel from testifying. Described as an attempt to "establish guidelines on how junior officers and the enlisted be contacted on their participation in the aforementioned briefings," critics of the guidelines argued at the time that they could impede investigations of the Iraq War, and that the Pentagon had no authority to set such rules. The memo did not impact congressional subpoenas, in which Congress can compel any individual to appear.

Wilkie holds personal and unit decorations as well as the Department of Defense Medal for Distinguished Public Service, the highest civilian award of the Department.

=== Private sector and return to congressional staff ===
From 2010 to 2015, Wilkie was vice president for strategic programs for CH2M Hill, an engineering company. According to his official biography, he worked on reform of Britain's Ministry of Defence supply and logistics system.

From 2015 to 2017, Wilkie was a senior advisor to U.S. Senator Thom Tillis.

In 2019, after the resignation of Jim Mattis, Wilkie lobbied the Trump White House for an appointment as Secretary of Defense, but was not chosen for the position.

=== First Trump administration ===
Wilkie worked on Donald Trump's presidential transition team. President Trump nominated Wilkie to the post of Under Secretary of Defense for Personnel and Readiness in July 2017. The Senate confirmed the nomination by unanimous consent on November 16, 2017.

On March 28, 2018, Trump announced via Twitter that Wilkie would serve as interim Secretary of Veterans Affairs until the Senate confirmed a successor. President Trump nominated Ronny Jackson to be VA secretary, but on May 18, 2018, after Jackson's nomination was withdrawn, President Trump nominated Wilkie to the position. On July 23, 2018, Wilkie's nomination as VA secretary was confirmed by the Senate by an 86–9 vote. He was sworn in on July 30, 2018.

In March 2020, the Trump White House appointed Wilkie to the White House Coronavirus Task Force.

==== VA inspector general investigation and report ====
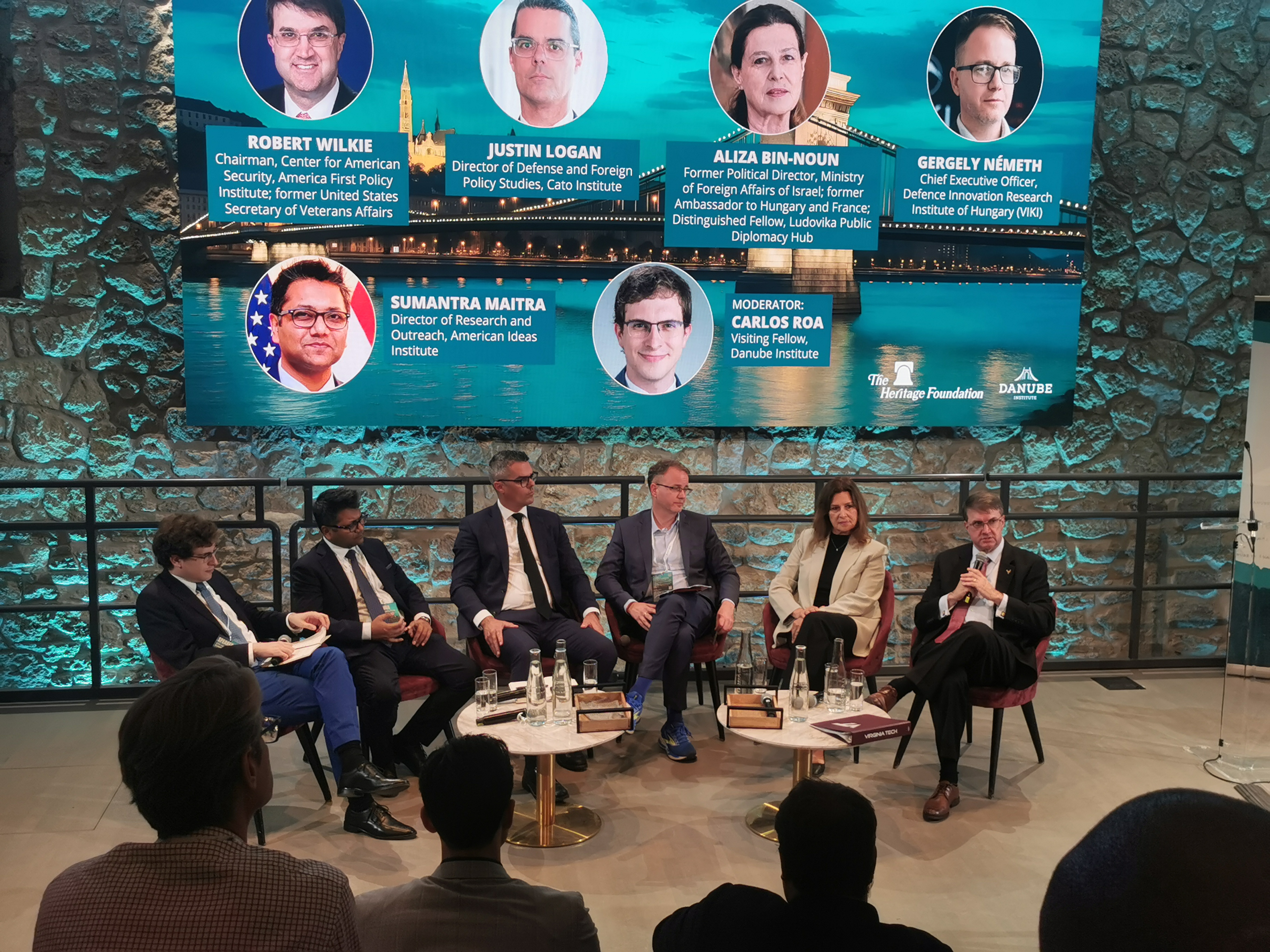
Robert Wilkie speaking at Danube Institute

The VA Office of Inspector General (IG) determined that Wilkie and his senior staff sought to discredit a woman who reported being sexually assaulted by a contractor at the D.C. Medical Center (the flagship VA hospital in Washington, D.C.) and impugn her credibility. The woman, a U.S. Navy veteran and an aide to the House Veterans' Affairs Committee, made the report in the fall of 2019; prosecutors declined to file sexual assault charges.

Wilkie and his senior staff openly questioned the veterans' account and suggested that her report was politically motivated. In February 2020, Wilkie abruptly fired James Byrne from his position of deputy secretary of veterans affairs. The dismissal was a surprise because Byrne had been popular among veterans' groups and was seen as a loyalist to Wilkie. Wilkie said that Byrne "was not jelling with other members of the team." Byrne later said he was fired because he declined to participate in an effort by Wilkie to smear the woman, telling Stars & Stripes, "I've gotten crossways with Wilkie over the [sexual assault] matter by refusing to trash this woman."

In a 68-page report issued in December 2020, VA IG Michael J. Missal determined that "The tone set by Secretary Wilkie was at minimum unprofessional and at worst provided the basis for VA leaders' attempts to undermine the veteran's credibility" and concluded that "Using denigrating remarks and questioning the credibility of a veteran who reported being sexually assaulted, and then failing to fully explore the facts, is ... contrary to the ongoing missions of improving VA and of serving the veteran community with respect." The IG did not substantiate an allegation that Wilkie had accessed the complainant's military and electronic health records, or asked others to do so, in an attempt to "dig up dirt" on her.

Wilkie and his two top press aides gave an interview to the investigators from the VA IG's Office, but refused to sit for follow-up interviews. The IG informed the Justice Department of possible criminal conduct by Wilkie (specifically relating to interference into the assault investigation and perjury during testimony to investigators); the IG did not make a formal criminal referral, and the Justice Department did not charge Wilkie with a crime, reportedly believing the evidence was insufficient. Wilkie denied all wrongdoing.

After the issuance of the IG report in December 2020, the heads of six major veterans organizations (the American Legion, Veterans of Foreign Wars, Disabled American Veterans, AMVETS, Vietnam Veterans of America, and Paralyzed Veterans of America) called upon President Trump to fire Wilkie from his post. The New York Times editorial board also called for Wilkie to be dismissed.

==== Pro-Confederate speeches ====
In a 1995 speech at the U.S. Capitol's statue of Jefferson Davis, Wilkie called Confederate President Jefferson Davis a "martyr to 'The Lost Cause'" and an "exceptional man in an exceptional age"; in a pro-Confederate event in 2009, Wilkie spoke about Robert E. Lee to the Sons of Confederate Veterans (SCV). He also called abolitionists who opposed slavery "radical", "mendacious", and "enemies of liberty", and stated that the Confederate "cause was honorable," while also condemning slavery as "a stain on our story as it is a stain on every civilization in history". Wilkie is a former member of the SCV and its Confederate Memorial Committee, having been listed as a member at least through 2010; In June 2018, a Defense Department spokesperson said that Wilkie no longer considered himself a member of the group.

During Wilkie's confirmation hearings to be VA secretary, he gave inaccurate answers to Senators regarding the dates of his speaking to Confederate groups. In sworn statements to the Senate as part of the nomination questionnaire, he failed to include his membership in the SCV and omitted his event speeches from responses asking for details on them.

==== Swastikas on grave markers ====
In 2020, the Military Religious Freedom Foundation demanded that the VA remove three headstones in two VA cemeteries (Fort Sam Houston in Texas and Fort Douglas Post in Utah) that mark the graves of World War II German prisoners of war. The three gravestones at issue featured the Nazi swastikas, the Iron Cross, and tributes to Adolf Hitler ("He died far from his home for the Führer, people and fatherland.")

Wilkie said that "erasing these headstones removes them from memory", that "divisive historical figures or events" should be recognized, and that removal would require a lengthy process under the National Historic Preservation Act of 1966. The VA removed the grave markers in 2020.

== Personal life ==
He is married to Julia Wilkie, whom he has known since childhood.

Political offices
Preceded by Dan Stanley	Assistant Secretary of Defense for Legislative Affairs; 2006–2009	Succeeded by Elizabeth King
Preceded by Jessica L. Wright	Under Secretary of Defense for Personnel and Readiness; 2017–2018	Succeeded by Matthew Donovan
Preceded by David Shulkin	United States Secretary of Veterans Affairs; Acting; 2018	Succeeded by Peter O'Rourke; Acting
Preceded by David Shulkin	United States Secretary of Veterans Affairs; 2018–2021	Succeeded by Denis McDonough
U.S. order of precedence (ceremonial)
Preceded by Alex Azar as Former U.S. Cabinet Member	Order of precedence of the United States as Former U.S. Cabinet Member	Succeeded by David Bernhardt as Former U.S. Cabinet Member
