= Paul Lawrence (government official) =

American government official

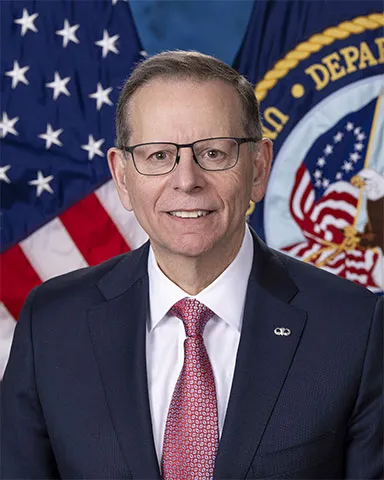
- Official portrait, 2025

11th United States Deputy Secretary of Veterans Affairs
- Incumbent
- Assumed office March 28, 2025
- President: Donald Trump
- Secretary: Doug Collins
- Preceded by: Tanya J. Bradsher

7th Under Secretary of Veterans Affairs for Benefits
- In office May 15, 2018 – January 20, 2021
- President: Donald Trump
- Preceded by: Allison A. Hickey
- Succeeded by: Joshua Jacobs

Personal details
- Born: Paul Reynold Lawrence c.1956 (age 69–70)
- Spouse: Ann P. Lawrence
- Children: 2
- Education: United States Army Airborne School; University of Massachusetts (BA); Virginia Tech (MA, PhD)
- Occupation: Government official; businessman; author
- Awards: Meritorious Service Medal

Military service
- Allegiance: United States
- Branch/service: United States Army
- Rank: Captain

Paul Reynold Lawrence (born c. 1956) is an American government official, businessman, author and former U.S. Army officer who has served as the 11th United States deputy secretary of veterans affairs since 2025 under President Donald Trump. He previously served as the 7th under secretary of veterans affairs for benefits from 2018 to 2021.

== Early life and education ==
Lawrence's father was a veteran of the Korean and Vietnam wars, and is buried in Section 66 of Arlington National Cemetery. Lawrence's middle name, Reynold, was given in honor of his uncle who was killed at Normandy during World War II.

Lawrence was commissioned into the army through the ROTC. He earned his BA in economics from the University of Massachusetts in 1978, and his MA and PhD in economics from Virginia Tech in 1982.

== Career ==
Lawrence in 2025

After graduate school, Lawrence served in the American army in the Finance Corp. He left as an Airborne qualified Captain and received the Meritorious Service Medal.

The majority of his later career was as a partner in accounting firms.

Lawrence was nominated to serve as the 7th Under Secretary of Veterans Affairs for Benefits by President Donald Trump, and was confirmed by the United States Senate on April 26, 2018.

On January 11, 2025 Trump announced that he nominated Lawrence to serve as the United States Deputy Secretary of Veterans Affairs. He was confirmed by the Senate in a 51–45 vote on March 27, and sworn into office on March 28 by Secretary Doug Collins.

== Personal life ==
Lawrence is married to Ann P. Lawrence, and has 2 children.
