= Peter O'Rourke =

Peter O'Rourke may refer to:

- Peter O'Rourke (footballer) (1873–1956)
- Peter O'Rourke (U.S. government official) (born 1966)
