= Pamela J. Powers =

American government official

Pamela Powers
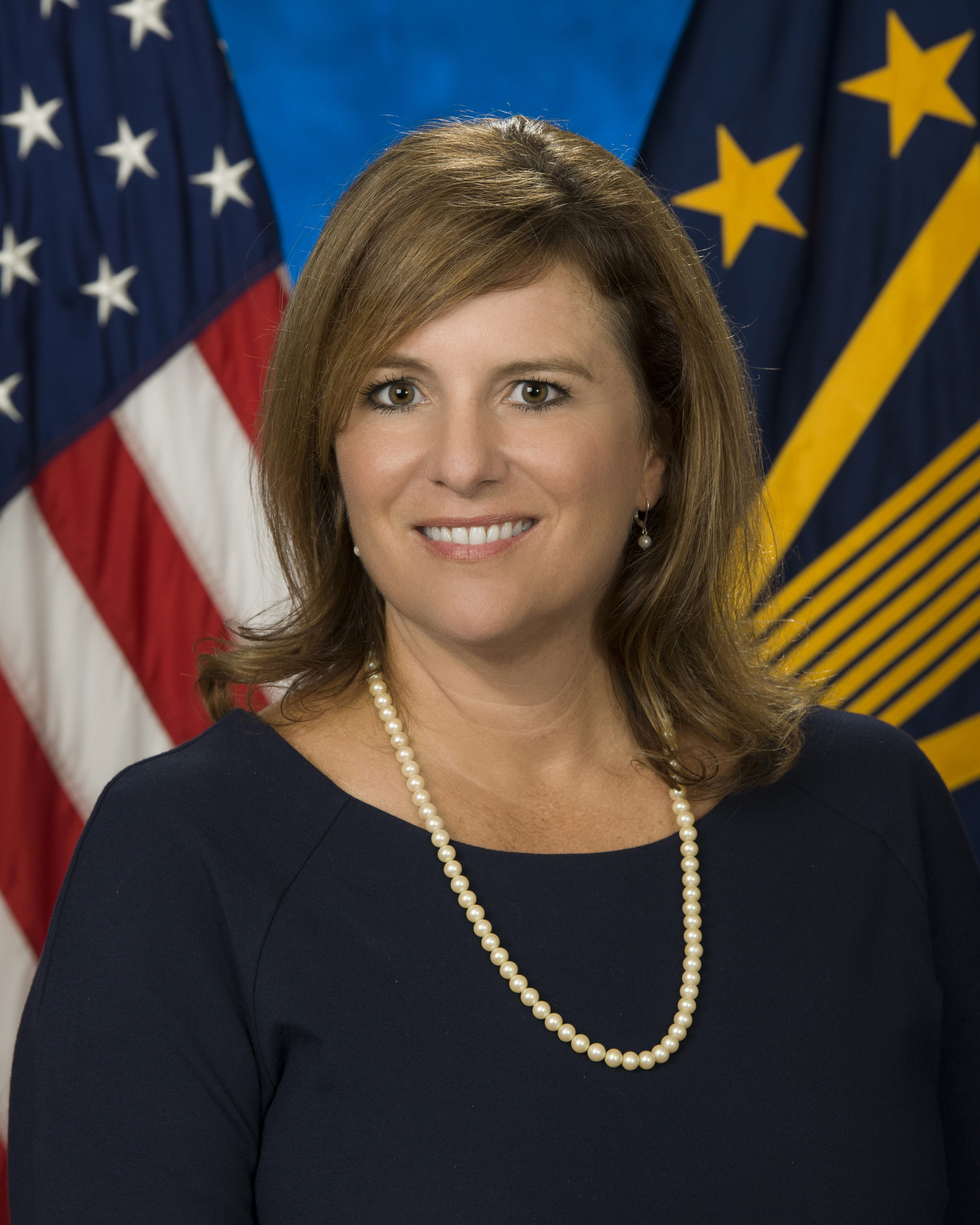
- Official portrait, 2020

United States Deputy Secretary of Veterans Affairs
- Acting
- In office April 2, 2020 – January 20, 2021
- President: Donald Trump
- Preceded by: James Byrne
- Succeeded by: Carolyn Clancy (acting)

Personal details
- Born: Minnesota, U.S.
- Education: United States Air Force Academy (BS); United States Army War College (MSS); University of Phoenix (MA)

Military service
- Allegiance: United States
- Branch/service: United States Air Force
- Rank: Colonel
- Awards: Legion of Merit; Defense Meritorious Service Medal

Pamela J. Powers is an American government official who served as the Acting United States Deputy Secretary of Veterans Affairs from April 2, 2020, to January 20, 2021.

== Education ==
Powers graduated from the United States Air Force Academy and received a Bachelor of Science degree in Organizational Psychology. She earned a Master of Strategic Studies from the United States Army War College and a Master of Organizational Management from the University of Phoenix.

== VA investigation ==
Powers was a central figure in an Inspector General investigation into allegations then-VA Secretary Robert Wilkie attempted to smear a Veteran who claimed to be sexually assaulted.

Powers told investigators women veterans described walking through the medical center as a “gauntlet” of unwelcome interactions, such as “cat calls.” She later told investigators that conditions in the medical center improved, but did not say what improvements VA made.

In the interview with investigators, Powers stated that Wilkie, in relating a conversation he had with Congressman Dan Crenshaw, “might have said something to the fact that, (the veteran) made allegations in the military as well when (Congressman Crenshaw and the veteran) served together or something to that effect.”

The Inspector General requested a second interview with Powers, but she repeatedly refused.

The Inspector General stated, “The evidence is replete with examples of VA senior leaders undertaking defensive actions and engaging in confrontational messaging while failing to recognize the need to take corrective action to address known problems.”

== Personal life ==
Powers' great-grandfather served in World War I and her grandfather served in World War II. She served in the United States Air Force and retired as a colonel on March 1, 2018. Her awards and decorations include the Legion of Merit and the Defense Meritorious Service Medal.

Political offices
Preceded by James Byrne	United States Deputy Secretary of Veterans Affairs; Acting; 2020–2021	Succeeded by Carolyn Clancy; Acting
