= Melissa Sue Glynn =

American government official

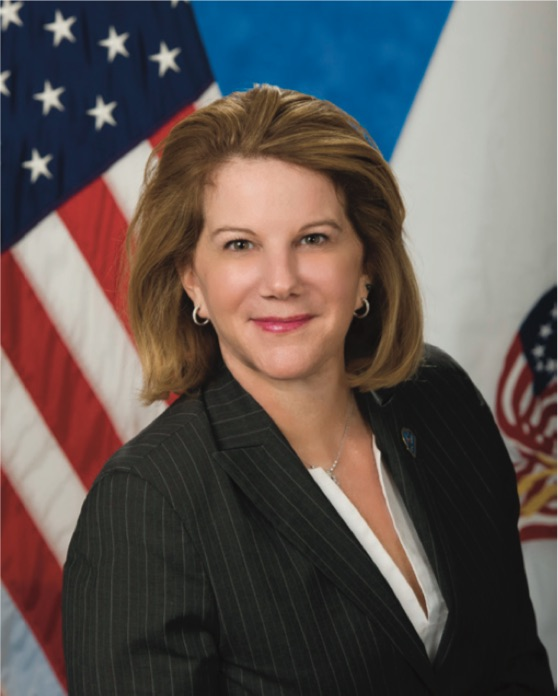
- Official portrait, 2018

Assistant Secretary of Veterans Affairs for Enterprise Integration
- In office January 2, 2018 – January 20, 2021
- President: Donald Trump
- Succeeded by: Dat P. Tran (acting)

Personal details
- Education: Rutgers University (BA); University of Arizona (MA, PhD)

Melissa Sue Glynn is an American consultant and government official who served between 2018 and 2021 as the Assistant Secretary of Veterans Affairs for Enterprise Integration. Prior to assuming her current role, she led Alvarez and Marsal's public sector practice focused on improving the delivery of government programs and K-12 and higher education. Previously, she was a principal with PricewaterhouseCoopers, where she was responsible for the firm's work with the United States Department of Veterans Affairs.

Glynn holds a Bachelor of Arts from Rutgers University and an Master of Arts and PhD from the University of Arizona. While working toward her doctorate, she served as co-director of the Center for the Management of Information at the University of Arizona. She was also a principal investigator on a cooperative grant from the National Science Foundation and several programs funded by defense research laboratories.
