= Peter O'Rourke (U.S. government official) =

American government official (born 1966)

Peter O'Rourke Jr.
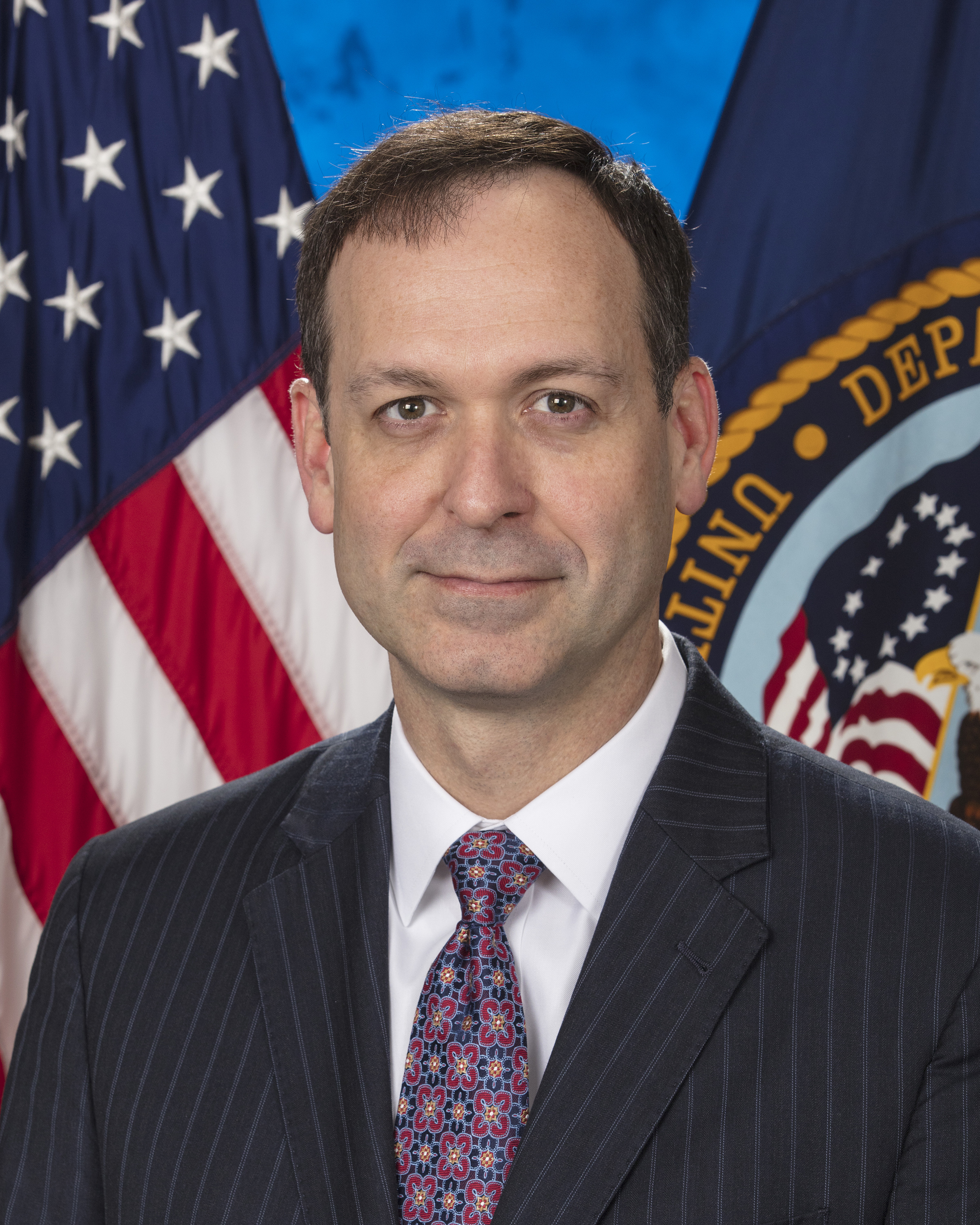
- Official portrait, 2018

Acting United States Secretary of Veterans Affairs
- In office May 29, 2018 – July 30, 2018
- President: Donald Trump
- Deputy: Thomas G. Bowman
- Preceded by: Robert Wilkie (acting)
- Succeeded by: Robert Wilkie

Personal details
- Born: January 3, 1966 (age 60) Baton Rouge, Louisiana, U.S.
- Party: Republican
- Education: University of Tennessee (BA); Air University (MS)
- Nickname: ROUR

Military service
- Allegiance: United States
- Branch/service: United States Navy; United States Air Force
- Years of service: 1988–2002

Peter O'Rourke (born January 3, 1966) is an American government official. He served as the acting United States Secretary of Veterans Affairs and VA Chief of Staff under President Donald Trump. He previously worked in various positions in government consulting, including as a congressional staffer for U.S. Representative Tom Latham, and as an employee for CALIBRE Systems, and he also served as the executive director of the Republican Party of Florida.

== Education ==
O'Rourke graduated with a degree in political science from the University of Tennessee in 1998 and in logistics, materials and supply chain management from the Air Force Institute of Technology of the Air University in 2005.

== Career ==
O'Rourke is a veteran of the Navy and Air Force. He held various leadership roles with Calibre Systems, the Association of the U.S. Army, Blackland Aerospace, Strong America Now, Accenture, and George Group Consulting.

=== Department of Veterans Affairs ===
In May 2017, O'Rourke began work within the Department of Veterans Affairs as the executive director for VA's Office of Accountability and Whistleblower Protection.

He was appointed by President Donald Trump to serve as the chief of staff of the VA on February 16, 2018, where he was key to the passage of the VA MISSION Act of 2018. The bill allocated $55 billion toward providing veterans with more private healthcare options.

On May 29, 2018, O'Rourke was appointed by President Trump to serve as the Acting Secretary of Veterans Affairs while Robert Wilkie awaited Senate confirmation to serve in the position in a permanent capacity. O'Rourke was chosen over Deputy Secretary Thomas Bowman, who announced his retirement in June 2018. Wilkie was sworn in as Secretary of the VA on July 30, 2018.

In December 2018, O'Rourke was forced to resign his position as VA senior advisor after the White House was told he was doing little work but still getting paid.

In October 2019, the Inspector General of the VA reported that O'Rourke had used his power as head of the whistleblower office to end investigations into allies, and that he had failed to provide basic reports to Congress on the office's operations.

=== Florida Republican Party ===
In August 2019, O'Rourke was appointed as the executive director of the Florida Republican Party. Some Florida Republicans criticized his running of the party. O'Rourke announced he would resign from his position in March 2020.

Political offices
| Preceded by Robert Wilkie; Acting | Acting United States Secretary of Veterans Affairs; May 29, 2018 – July 30, 2018 | Succeeded by Robert Wilkie |
