= James Byrne (lawyer) =

American lawyer (born 1964)

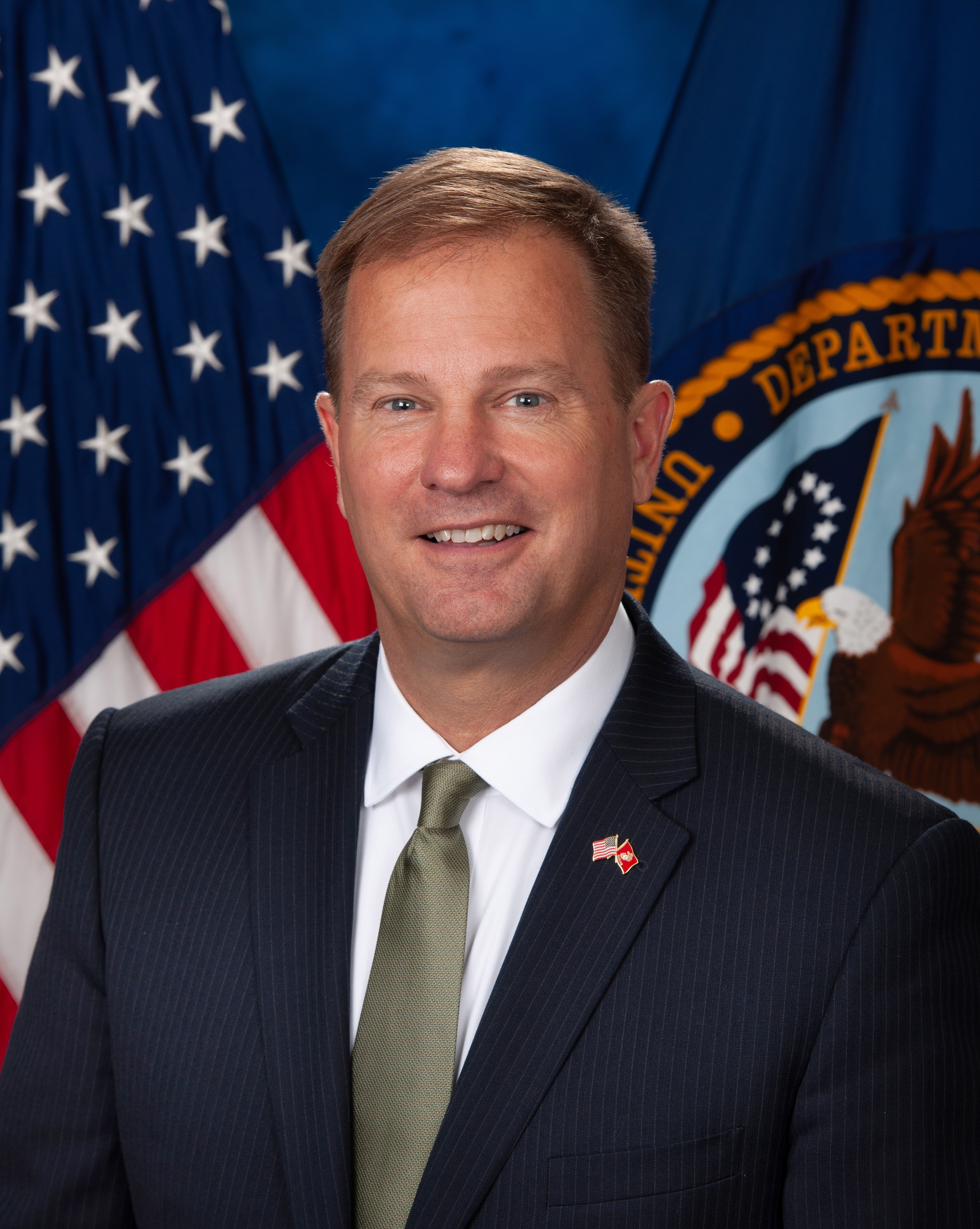
- Byrne (c. 2020)

8th United States Deputy Secretary of Veterans Affairs
- In office September 16, 2019 – February 3, 2020; Acting: August 28, 2018 – September 16, 2019
- President: Donald Trump
- Preceded by: Thomas G. Bowman
- Succeeded by: Donald Remy

General Counsel of the United States Department of Veterans Affairs
- In office August 8, 2017 – September 16, 2019
- President: Donald Trump
- Preceded by: Leigh A. Bradley
- Succeeded by: Richard Sauber

Personal details
- Born: James Michael Byrne; August 28, 1964 (age 62) St. Louis, Missouri, U.S.
- Spouse: Rebecca L. Cogburn
- Children: 6
- Education: United States Naval Academy (BS); Stetson University (JD)

Military service
- Allegiance: United States
- Branch/service: United States Marine Corps
- Years of service: 1987–2007
- Rank: Lieutenant Colonel

James Michael Byrne (born August 28, 1964) is an American lawyer who served as the United States Deputy Secretary of Veterans Affairs from August 2018 to February 2020. He previously served as the general counsel for the United States Department of Veterans Affairs.

== Education ==
Byrne receive an undergraduate engineering degree from the United States Naval Academy, where he was a Secretary of the Navy distinguished graduate and the brigade commander. He earned his J.D. from Stetson University College of Law. After law school, he clerked for Judge Malcolm Jones Howard of the United States District Court for the Eastern District of North Carolina.

== Career ==
Prior to serving at the U. S. Department of Veterans Affairs, Byrne was Associate General Counsel and Chief Privacy Officer at Lockheed Martin. At Lockheed Martin, he also served as the company's primary cyber and counterintelligence attorney.

Byrne served as a deployed Marine Infantry Officer for six years before transferring into the Marine Corps Reserves. In 2004, he served active duty with the United States Marine Corps for 18 months, where he was an officer in charge of the Marine Liaison Office at medical centers in Maryland. In this capacity, he supported injured and deceased marines and their families.

Byrne worked for the United States Department of Justice as an international narcotics prosecutor. He has also served as a career Senior Executive Service Deputy Special Counsel with the United States Office of Special Counsel and as both General Counsel and Assistant Inspector General for Investigations with the Special Inspector General for Iraq Reconstruction.

He is a former adjunct professor of Marymount University and East Carolina University.

Until August 2017, Byrne served on the U.S. Department of Homeland Security Data Privacy and Integrity Advisory Board and the International Association of Privacy Professionals Board of Directors. Byrne volunteers in his community, and has served on several non-profit and advisory boards. For ten years, he volunteered on the Executive Board of Give an Hour, a non-profit organization that has developed national networks of volunteer professionals capable of providing complimentary and confidential mental health services in response to both acute and chronic conditions that arise within our society, beginning with the mental health needs of post-9/11 veterans, service members and their families.

=== Department of Veterans Affairs ===
From 2017 to 2019, Byrne served as VA's General Counsel, being nominated by President Donald Trump.

On August 28, 2018, Trump named Byrne as Acting Deputy Secretary of Veterans Affairs. On April 12, 2019, Trump nominated Byrne to serve permanently as Deputy Secretary of Veterans Affairs. He was confirmed by the Senate on September 11, 2019 and was sworn in on September 16, 2019. Byrne retired from government service on February 3, 2020.

=== Corporate Senior Executive and Board Director ===
Since his departure from the VA he now works as a Vice President at Lockheed Martin Corporation, serves on several corporate and non-profit boards, and advocates for veterans.

Political offices
Preceded by Thomas G. Bowman	United States Deputy Secretary of Veterans Affairs; 2018–2020	Succeeded by Pamela J. Powers; Acting
