= Tanya J. Bradsher =

American military officer

Tanya Bradsher
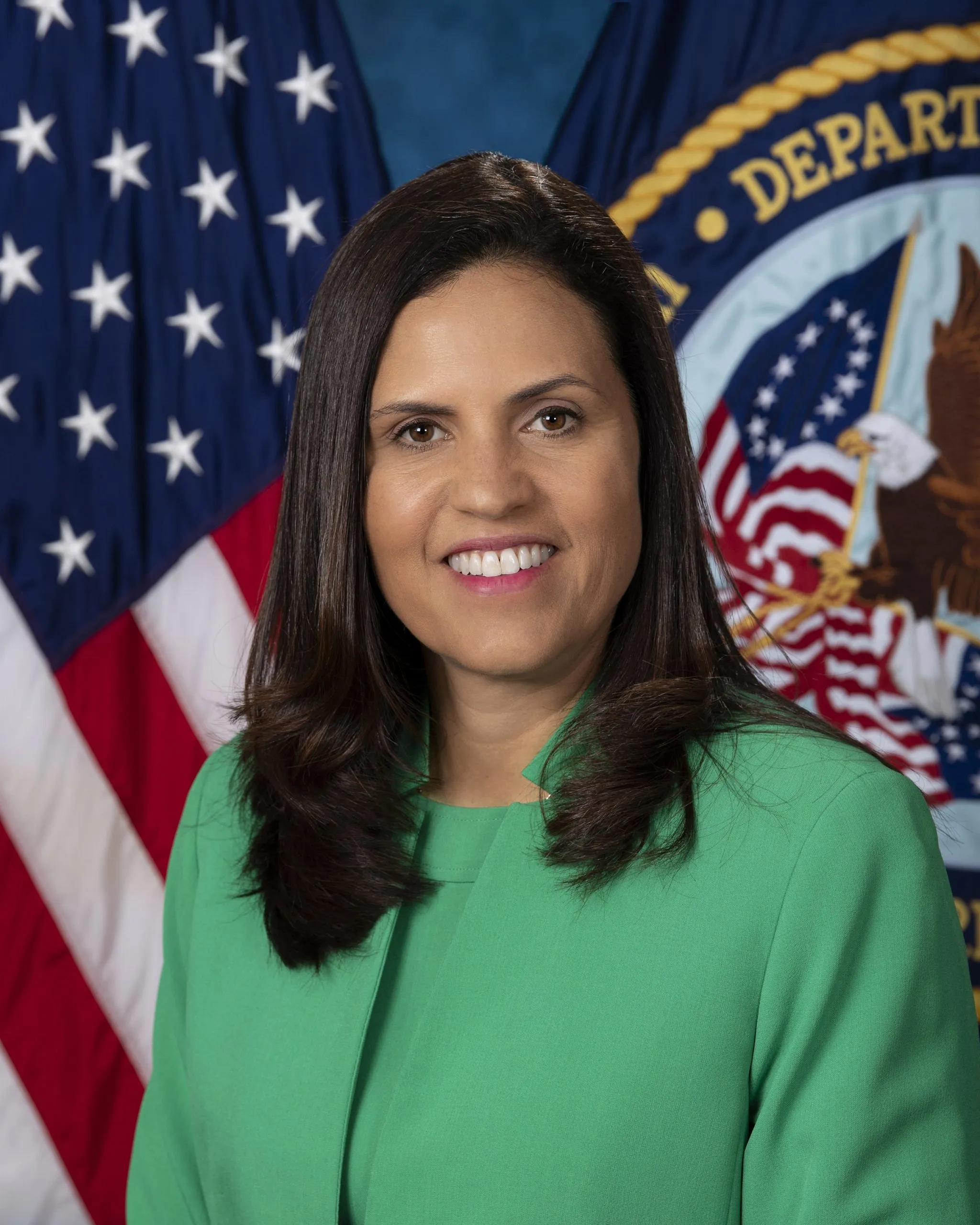
- Official portrait, 2023

10th United States Deputy Secretary of Veterans Affairs
- In office September 20, 2023 – January 20, 2025
- President: Joe Biden
- Preceded by: Donald Remy
- Succeeded by: Paul Lawrence

Personal details
- Spouse: John Bradsher
- Children: 3
- Education: University of North Carolina, Chapel Hill (BA); George Washington University (MA)

Military service
- Allegiance: United States
- Branch/service: United States Army
- Years of service: 1993–2013
- Rank: Lieutenant Colonel

Tanya J. Bradsher is an American government official and retired United States Army lieutenant colonel who served as the 10th United States Deputy Secretary of Veterans Affairs from 2023 to 2025. She previously served as chief of staff to Secretary of Veterans Affairs Denis McDonough from 2021 to 2023.

Bradsher became the first woman confirmed as Deputy Secretary of Veterans Affairs and the highest-ranking woman in the department's history at the time of her appointment.

== Early life and education ==
Bradsher is a native of Virginia. She earned a Bachelor of Arts degree from the University of North Carolina at Chapel Hill and a Master of Arts in strategic communication from George Washington University.

== Career ==
Bradsher enlisted in the United States Army in 1993 and was commissioned in the Officer Candidate School in 1994. During her 20 years of active duty, Bradsher was assigned to the United States National Security Council and Office of the Secretary of Defense. She also served as deputy public affairs officer of the Eighth United States Army, commander of the Delta Company 516th Battalion, and executive officer of the 1st Replacement Company, 8th Personnel Support Command.

After retiring from the Army, Bradsher returned to the National Security Council and served as an advisor in the Executive Office of the President. Bradsher worked as chief of communications for the American Psychiatric Association before joining Congressman Don Beyer's office as chief of staff. She later served as chief for communications, plans, and operations in the Defense Health Agency. In 2021, Bradhser was selected by Secretary Denis McDonough as chief of staff of the United States Department of Veterans Affairs.

=== Nomination to Deputy Secretary ===
On April 19, 2023, President Joe Biden announced his intent to nominate Bradsher to serve as the United States deputy secretary of Veterans Affairs, after Donald Remy resigned on April 1. On September 20, 2023, Brasher was sworn in as the Deputy Secretary of Veterans Affairs.

Bradsher resigned on January 20, 2025, at the conclusion of the Biden administration. On January 22, 2025, President Donald Trump nominated former Under Secretary for Benefits Paul Lawrence to succeed her as Deputy Secretary.

Political offices
Preceded by Guy Kiyokawa; Acting	United States Deputy Secretary of Veterans Affairs; 2023–2025	Succeeded by Paul Lawrence
