= Veterans Benefits Administration =

Component of U.S. Department Veterans Affairs

U.S. Department of Veterans Affairs Veterans Benefits Administration
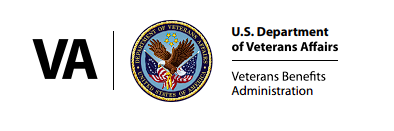

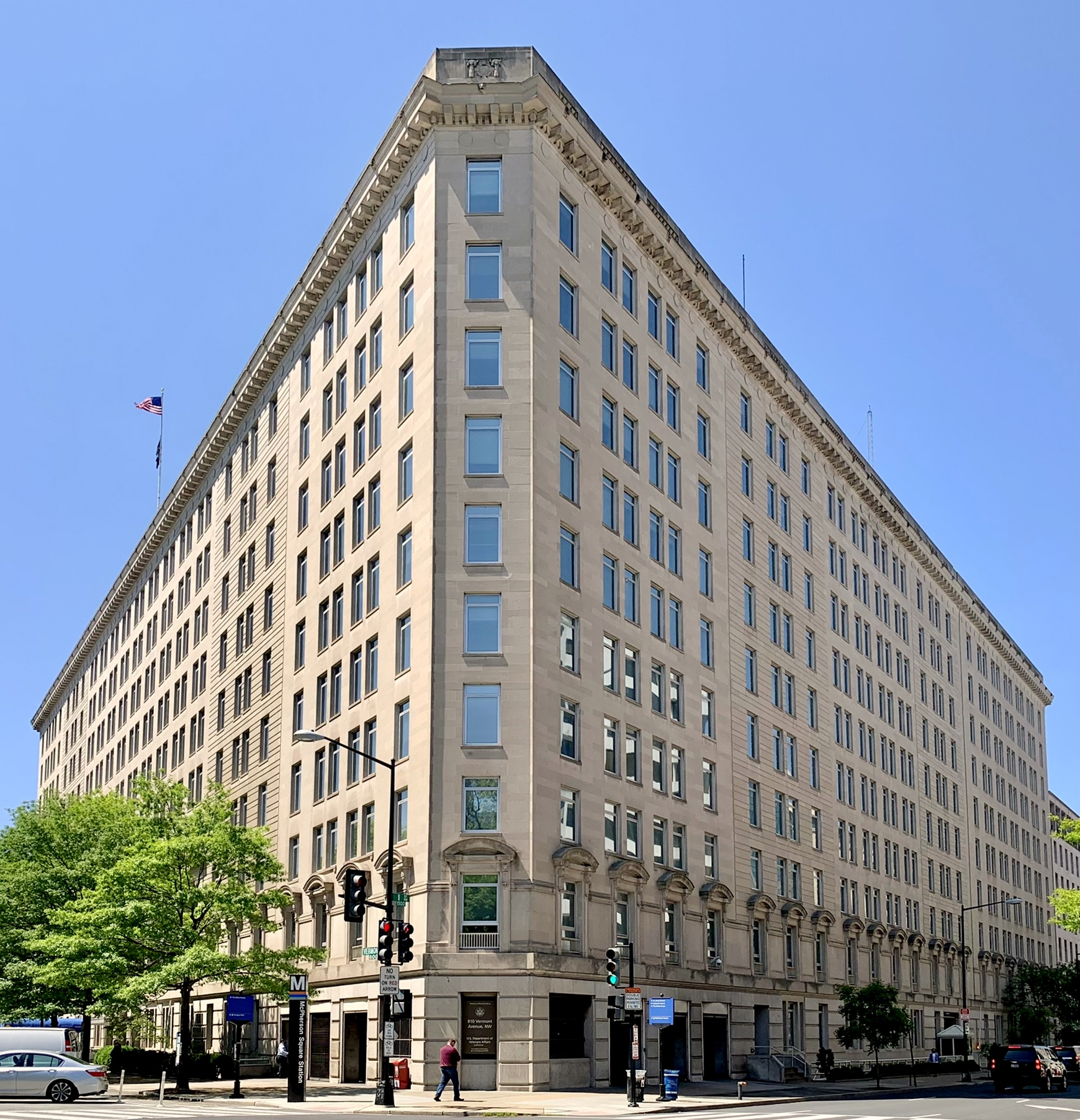
- Department of Veterans Affairs Headquarters in Washington, D.C.

Agency overview
- Formed: 1953; 73 years ago
- Jurisdiction: Federal government of the United States
- Headquarters: Veterans Affairs Building 810 Vermont Avenue NW., Washington, D.C., United States; 38°54′3.25″N 77°2′5.37″W
- Employees: 32,000 (2023)
- Agency executives: Margarita Devlin, Acting Under Secretary for Benefits; Margarita Devlin, Principal Deputy Under Secretary for Benefits
- Parent department: United States Department of Veterans Affairs
- Child agency: List of Veterans Benefits Administration regional offices
- Website: va.gov/benefits

The Veterans Benefits Administration (VBA) is an agency of the U.S. Department of Veterans Affairs. It is responsible for administering the department's programs that provide financial and other forms of assistance to veterans, their dependents, and survivors. Major benefits include veterans' compensation, veterans' pension, survivors' benefits, rehabilitation and employment assistance, education assistance, home loan guaranties, and life insurance coverage.

== History ==
VBA has a history that can be traced back to the American Revolution when the Continental Congress passed the first national pension laws for wounded soldiers. Initially, these pensions were administered by individual states until the federal government assumed responsibility in 1789.

=== Early beginnings, World War I and World War II ===
In the early 1800s, the clerical work related to veterans' claims was handled by a small office within the War Department. By 1833, this office evolved into the Bureau of Pensions, tasked with administering pension payments to veterans and their families. Following the Civil War, the bureau's responsibilities expanded significantly as the federal government recognized diseases contracted during military service as grounds for disability claims.

During World War I, new types of benefits, such as insurance and vocational training for disabled veterans, were introduced. These programs were initially managed by separate agencies until the Veterans Bureau was established in 1921 to centralize their administration. In 1930, President Herbert Hoover signed an executive order that merged the Veterans Bureau, the Bureau of Pensions, and the National Home for Disabled Volunteer Soldiers to form the Veterans Administration (VA). This consolidation aimed to streamline and improve the delivery of benefits and services to veterans. The VA became the central agency responsible for administering a range of veterans' benefits, including medical care, disability compensation, and pensions.

Following World War II, the VA faced unprecedented challenges as millions of service members sought to claim their benefits. The Servicemen's Readjustment Act of 1944, which was the original "GI Bill", provided education benefits, unemployment compensation, and home loans, significantly impacting the lives of returning veterans. To manage the surge in claims, the VA expanded its workforce and facilities, leading to the establishment of the Department of Veterans Benefits in 1953, the direct predecessor of today's VBA.

=== Vietnam and Gulf War era ===
In the decades following World War II, the VA continued to evolve and expand its services, including after future conflicts in Korea and Vietnam, including expanding the provisions of the original GI Bill to veterans of both conflicts. post-Vietnam Era Veterans' Educational Assistance Program (VEAP) was introduced in 1980, providing education benefits to veterans who served after the Vietnam War. VEAP allowed eligible veterans to contribute to an education fund, with the government matching their contributions to help cover the costs of education and training. In 1984, Congress passed the Veterans' Educational Assistance Act of 1984, also known as the Montgomery GI Bill, which provided expanded education benefits to veterans who served on active duty by offering financial assistance for education and training programs, significantly enhancing the opportunities available to veterans for personal and professional development.

VBA was officially established as a distinct entity within the VA in 1989, when the Department of Veterans Affairs was created as a Cabinet-level department. This reorganization aimed to enhance the focus on veterans' benefits and improve the efficiency of service delivery,

Following the Persian Gulf War in 1991, VA recognized the unique health challenges faced by Gulf War veterans. This led to regulatory expansions that established presumptive service connections for a range of undiagnosed illnesses and medically unexplained chronic multisymptomatic illnesses associated with service in the Southwest Asia theater of operations. These conditions include chronic fatigue syndrome, fibromyalgia, and irritable bowel syndrome, among others.

=== Post 9/11 Modernization ===
In recent years, Congress has focused on expanding services and benefits available to veterans, considering the projected growth of the Veteran populations after the War in Afghanistan and Iraq War conflicts. This includes the implementation of various modernization and technical advancements, including enhancements in claims processing technology, and increased outreach efforts to ensure that veterans are aware of and can access the benefits they have earned.

Some key legislative acts that expanded VBAs portfolio include:

- The Post-9/11 Veterans Educational Assistance Act of 2008 significantly enhanced educational benefits for veterans who served after September 10, 2001. This bill included provisions for tuition and fees, a housing allowance, and a stipend for books and supplies, making higher education more accessible for a new generation of veterans. This was further modified by the Harry W. Colmery Veterans Educational Assistance Act of 2017, (dubbed the "Forever GI Bill"), that eliminated the 15-year time limit on using Post-9/11 GI Bill Benefits.
- The Veterans Appeals Improvement and Modernization Act of 2017 reformed the appeals process for veterans' benefits claims, aiming to reduce the backlog and expedite decisions. This act introduced a new framework for handling appeals, providing veterans with multiple options to seek review of their claims and improving the overall efficiency of the appeals process.
- The Honoring our Promise to Address Comprehensive Toxics (PACT) Act of 2022 expanded health care and benefits for veterans exposed to burn pits and other toxic substances, reflecting VA's ongoing commitment to addressing the long-term health impacts of military service.

== Agency structure ==
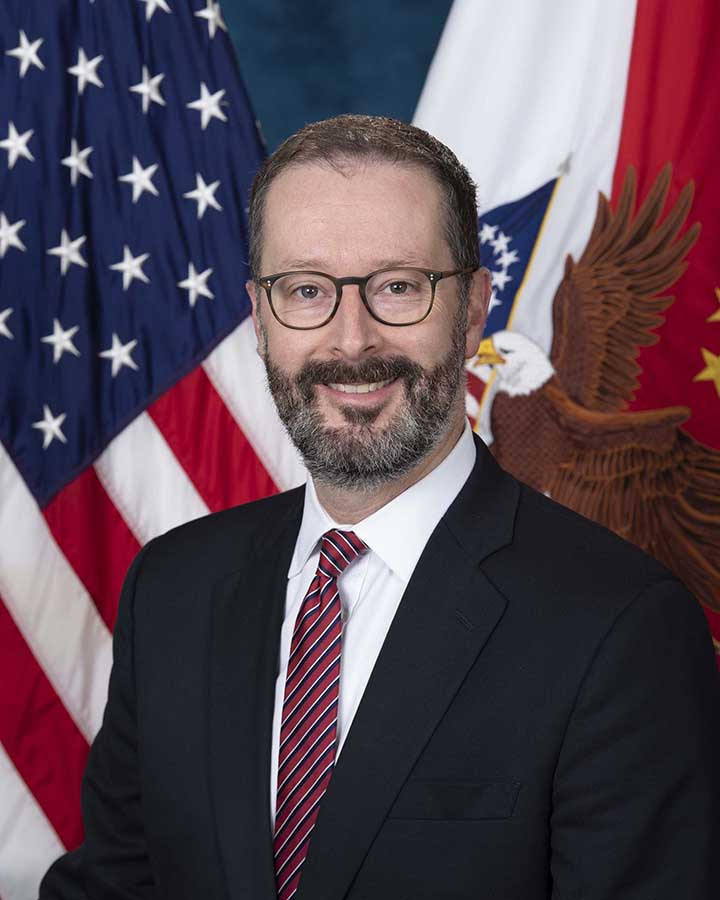
Undersecretary for Benefits Joshua Jacobs

=== Leadership ===
VBA operates under the leadership of the Acting Under Secretary for Benefits (USB), currently Michael Frueh, who is responsible for overseeing the delivery of benefits and services to veterans and their families. The USB is supported by the Principal Deputy Under Secretary for Benefits (PDUSB) who assists the USB in managing the overall operations of VBA and serves as the senior advisor. Under the PDUSB are two additional DUSB offices: The Deputy Under Secretary, Office of Policy and Oversight who manages and oversees the administration of VBA's benefits portfolio through their respective service lines, and the Deputy Under Secretary, Office of Field Operations (DUS-FO) who provides, management and guidance to the 56 regional offices and ensures the effective delivery of benefits and services at the local level.

=== Office of Policy and Oversight ===
Through the Office of Policy and Oversight (OPO), each one of the below service lines is managed by an Executive Director who implements the policies and enforces the procedures

=== Compensation Service ===
The Compensation Service provides tax-free monetary benefits to veterans with disabilities resulting from or aggravated by military service. Veterans can apply for disability compensation online, by mail, or in person at a VA regional office. VBA evaluates claims based on the severity of the disability and its impact on the veteran's ability to work. Veterans may also receive additional compensation for dependents. Lesser-known compensation areas include:

- Burial and Interment Allowances: Financial assistance for the burial and funeral costs of eligible veterans.
- Spina Bifida Allowance (38 USC 1805): Monthly monetary allowances, vocational training, and healthcare benefits for children of Vietnam and Korean War veterans diagnosed with spina bifida.
- Children of Women Vietnam Veterans Born with Certain Defects: Benefits including a monthly allowance, vocational training, and healthcare for children born with certain birth defects to women who served in Vietnam.

=== Pension and Fiduciary Service ===
The Pension and Fiduciary Service offers pension programs for wartime veterans and their survivors. The Veterans Pension provides monthly payments to wartime veterans who meet certain age or disability requirements and have limited income and net worth. The Survivors Pension, also known as the Death Pension, offers monthly payments to the surviving spouses and unmarried dependent children of deceased wartime veterans. The Fiduciary Service provides oversight for VA's most vulnerable beneficiaries who are unable to manage their own VA benefits. Additionally, Dependency and Indemnity Compensation (DIC) provides monthly benefits to eligible survivors of service members who died in the line of duty or veterans whose death resulted from a service-related injury or disease.

=== Education Service ===
The Education Service administers several educational assistance programs to help veterans and their families pursue their educational goals. The Post-9/11 GI Bill provides financial support for education and housing to individuals with at least 90 days of aggregate service after September 10, 2001, or those discharged with a service-connected disability after 30 days. This program covers tuition and fees, a monthly housing allowance, and a stipend for books and supplies. Veterans can also transfer their benefits to dependents under certain conditions. Another significant program is the Montgomery GI Bill, which provides up to 36 months of education benefits to eligible veterans for various educational pursuits. VBA also offers educational benefits for veteran dependents through programs such as the Survivors' and Dependents' Educational Assistance (DEA) Program, which provides education and training opportunities to eligible dependents of veterans who are permanently and totally disabled due to a service-related condition, or who died while on active duty or as a result of a service-related condition. The Marine Gunnery Sergeant John David Fry Scholarship provides Post-9/11 GI Bill benefits to children and surviving spouses of service members who died in the line of duty after September 10, 2001. Other educational programs include the Veterans’ Educational Assistance Program (VEAP), the National Call to Service Program, and the Reserve Educational Assistance Program (REAP).

=== Home Loan Guaranty Service ===
VA Home Loan Guaranty Service program helps veterans, service members, and eligible surviving spouses obtain, retain, and adapt homes. VA does not directly provide loans but instead facilitates the loan process by offering a partial guaranty of loans made by private lenders. This guaranty replaces the need for a substantial down payment and private mortgage insurance required in conventional mortgage transactions. The service also includes the Native American Direct Loan (NADL) program, which provides direct loans to eligible Native American veterans to finance the purchase, construction, or improvement of homes on Federal Trust Land. Additionally, the Veterans Affairs Supplemental Loan (VASP) program and other foreclosure avoidance programs offer support to veterans facing financial difficulties.

=== Insurance Service ===
The Insurance Service administers several insurance programs, including Servicemembers' Group Life Insurance (SGLI), which provides low-cost term life insurance to eligible service members. Veterans' Group Life Insurance (VGLI) allows veterans to convert their SGLI coverage to renewable term insurance after separation from service. The Service-Disabled Veterans Insurance (S-DVI) program offers life insurance to veterans with service-connected disabilities. The Veterans Affairs Life Insurance (VALife) program is a new benefit that provides guaranteed acceptance whole life insurance to veterans with service-connected disabilities. Additionally, Traumatic Injury Protection under Servicemembers' Group Life Insurance (TSGLI) provides short-term financial assistance to severely injured service members to assist them in their recovery from traumatic injuries.

=== Veteran Readiness and Employment (VR&E) Service ===
The Veteran Readiness and Employment (VR&E) Service, formerly known as the Veteran Rehabilitation & Education Service, assists veterans with service-connected disabilities to prepare for, find, and maintain suitable careers. The program offers services such as vocational counseling, training, education, and job placement assistance. VR&E services include comprehensive evaluation to determine abilities, skills, and interests for employment, vocational counseling and rehabilitation planning, employment services such as job-training and job-seeking skills, assistance finding and keeping a job, including the use of special employer incentives, and, if needed, post-secondary training at a college, vocational, technical or business school. Additionally, VR&E supports independent living for veterans unable to work due to their disabilities through its readiness (rehabilitation) mission.

=== Other OPO Offices ===
- The Office of Administrative Review (OAR) is responsible to OPO for the implementation of the AMA framework. OAR provides the oversight and policy guidance to the three Decision Review Operations Centers (DROC) (Seattle, Washington, St. Petersburg, Florida and Washington, D.C.) that manage and review higher level reviews, and process and complete Board grants and remands.
- The Office of Outreach, Transition and Economic Development (OTED) partners within and outside of VA and with numerous federal agencies to advance the economic empowerment and independence of service members, veterans, and their families through increasing access to VA benefits, programs, and services that support a seamless transition from military service to civilian life. OTED is the responsible office for participating in the Transition Assistance Program (TAP) to provide the mandated VA Benefits and Services brief, informing transitioning Service members on the available benefits and services available from VA.
- The Medical Disability Examination Office is responsible for managing the VBA's contract medical disability examinations, which provide Compensation & Pension Exams to veterans who apply for disability compensation with the statutorily required medical examination to veterans and other claimants who require exams in support of their compensation claims.

=== Office of Field Operations ===
The Office of Field Operations (OFO) provides operational oversight to the district offices and 56 regional offices within the United States, Puerto Rico, and the Philippines. OFO also facilitates outreach and public contact services across the administration and ensures quality and training for VBA employees who engage with service members, veterans, and their families through client services such as the National Contact Center. Each state has at least one Regional Office, along with Washington, DC, the Philippines, and Puerto Rico. Larger states & states with higher veteran populations have more than one office—three in California (San Diego, Los Angeles, and Oakland), and two each in New York (New York City and Buffalo), Texas (Houston and Waco), and Pennsylvania (Philadelphia and Pittsburgh). Even though there are regional offices in each state, VR&E claims are the only ones processed exclusively at local regional offices. Compensation claims can be assigned to any regional office through the National Work Queue, ensuring efficient distribution of workload based on resource availability. Other claims are processed through specialized regional processing structures:

- Pension Service claims are processed through Pension Management Centers located at the Regional Offices in Philadelphia, Pennsylvania; St. Paul, Minnesota; and Milwaukee, Wisconsin.
- Fiduciary Service claims are processed through one of six fiduciary hubs located at the Regional Offices in Columbia, South Carolina; Indianapolis, Indiana; Lincoln, Nebraska; Louisville, Kentucky; Milwaukee, Wisconsin; and Salt Lake City, Utah.
- Education Service claims are processed through one of two regional processing offices located at the Regional Offices in Buffalo, New York; and Muskogee, Oklahoma.
- Home Loan Guaranty Service claims are processed through one of eight regional offices located at the Regional Offices in St. Petersburg, Florida; St. Paul, Minnesota; Roanoke, Virginia; Phoenix, Arizona; Denver, Colorado; Cleveland, Ohio; Atlanta, Georgia; and Houston, Texas.
- Insurance Service claims nationwide are processed at the Philadelphia Regional Office and Insurance Center in Philadelphia, PA

== Budget and performance ==
Over the past five fiscal years, the VBA has seen requested consistent increases in its budget to accommodate the rising number of claims and to enhance service delivery. The budget requests have focused on various modernization initiatives, such as updating the VA Schedule for Rating Disabilities, support for new legislative mandates, such as the Blue Water Navy Vietnam Veterans Act and the PACT Act, and improvements and expansion of various benefits management systems. While the requested amounts generally aim to reflect the administration's priorities and plans for enhancing veterans' services, the appropriated amounts, approved by Congress, can differ. These differences can affect the implementation and expansion of various programs. For instance, in some years, the appropriated amounts may be lower than requested, necessitating adjustments in planned initiatives. Conversely, in other years, additional appropriations may be made to address unforeseen needs or emergencies. Additionally, the VA receives advance appropriations to ensure that in the event of an impasse in appropriations, VA benefit delivery is not affected. Therefore, the table numbers may not completely reflect the requested or appropriated dollars.

For fiscal year 2025, VBAs requested amounts emphasize the continued modernization efforts, including the expansion of the Veterans Benefits Management System (VBMS), increased funding to support timely processing of claims, and the implementation of the Honoring our PACT Act, which addresses benefits related to toxic exposures.

FY 2020-2025 Budget Requests
Fiscal Year	Compensation		Pensions		Education (Note: Budget requests include all education benefits administered under the Education and VR&E services.)		Housing Programs (Note: Does not include funding for Native American Direct Loan Program, which is appropriated separately.)		VR&E		Insurance Benefits		Burial Allowances (Note: Although budgeted/appropriated separately, operating expenses for this program are paid from the GOE of the Compensation Service.)	OTED	Total Direct Benefits	
Fiscal Year	Direct Payments	Operating Expenses	Direct Payments	Operating Expenses	Direct Payments	Operating Expenses	Direct Payments	Operating Expenses	Direct Payments	Operating Expenses	Direct Payments	Operating Expenses	Direct Payments	Operating Expenses	Direct Payments	Operating Expenses
2020	$104,521,680	$2,100,000	$5,399,190	$331,300	$14,618,908	$223,500	$201,916	$20,800	$1,824,723	$245,400	$129,224	$1,300	$330,590	$82,400	$125,201,508	$3,004,700
2021	$115,761,451	$2,181,749	$4,944,460	$349,565	$14,824,693	$256,188	$199,040	$27,244	$1,542,002	$279,209	$580,164	$1,870	$354,986	$111,176	$136,664,794	$3,207,001
2022	$133,794,514	$2,279,201	$4,772,559	$357,915	$13,175,454	$343,553	$224,733	$34,005	$1,824,723	$286,401	$500,198	$1,524	$418,008	$120,401	$152,885,466	$3,423,000
2023	$141,420,690	$2,651,672	$3,548,552	$384,321	$12,223,649	$352,294	$530,630	$42,466	$1,726,699	$294,088	$408,604	$1,585	$411,781	$136,573	$158,543,906	$3,863,000
2024	$177,740,336	$2,623,782	$3,206,643	$406,091	$12,466,467	$371,073	$318,307	$46,868	$1,976,337	$307,671	$356,633	$1,646	$443,302	$141,868	$194,531,688	$3,898,999
2025	$188,743,668	$2,741,777	$3,038,638	$410,187	$15,853,044	$377,928	$2,620,762	$54,132	$2,407,674	$305,043	$292,514	$920	$348,908	$145,013	$210,897,534	$4,034,000
Amounts shown in thousands of dollars.

== Ongoing Challenges ==
=== Claims Delays and Appeal Backlogs ===
VBA has faced persistent criticism for significant delays in processing disability claims and appeals, leading to financial hardships and prolonged periods without benefits for veterans, and increased backlogs. While VBA has made efforts to streamline the process, challenges remain. The Appeals Modernization Act of 2017 introduced more efficient options for appeals, but the backlog continues. Integrating electronic health records (EHR) systems aims to streamline the process, though technical and logistical challenges persist. Early data suggests new review processes are expediting appeals, but the full impact is still being evaluated.

=== Inconsistent service quality ===
Service quality across regional offices has been inconsistent, with veterans reporting varying experiences in accuracy, timeliness, and helpfulness. Efforts to standardize training and protocols are ongoing, but discrepancies still exist. Enhanced customer service training for VBA employees focuses on improving communication, understanding veterans' needs, and providing accurate information, showing positive results in service quality.

=== Technology and modernization issues ===
Modernizing VBA's technology infrastructure has been challenging, with outdated systems and technical glitches contributing to delays and inefficiencies. Efforts to upgrade technology and implement new systems are ongoing, but progress has been slower than anticipated. Issues with the rollout of new electronic health record systems have further complicated these efforts. Investments in new claims processing software, enhanced data analytics, and improved cybersecurity measures are expected to reduce processing times and improve service delivery.

=== Transparency and accountability ===
Concerns about the transparency and accountability of VBA's operations have been raised. Critics argue that VBA has not always been forthcoming about its challenges and the steps being taken to address them. Calls for increased transparency and better communication with veterans and the public aim to build trust and ensure accountability. Regular reports and audits have been suggested as ways to improve transparency. VBA has launched various outreach and education initiatives, including online resources, informational webinars, and collaboration with veteran service organizations to increase awareness and access to benefits.
