= Donald Remy =

American attorney (born 1967)

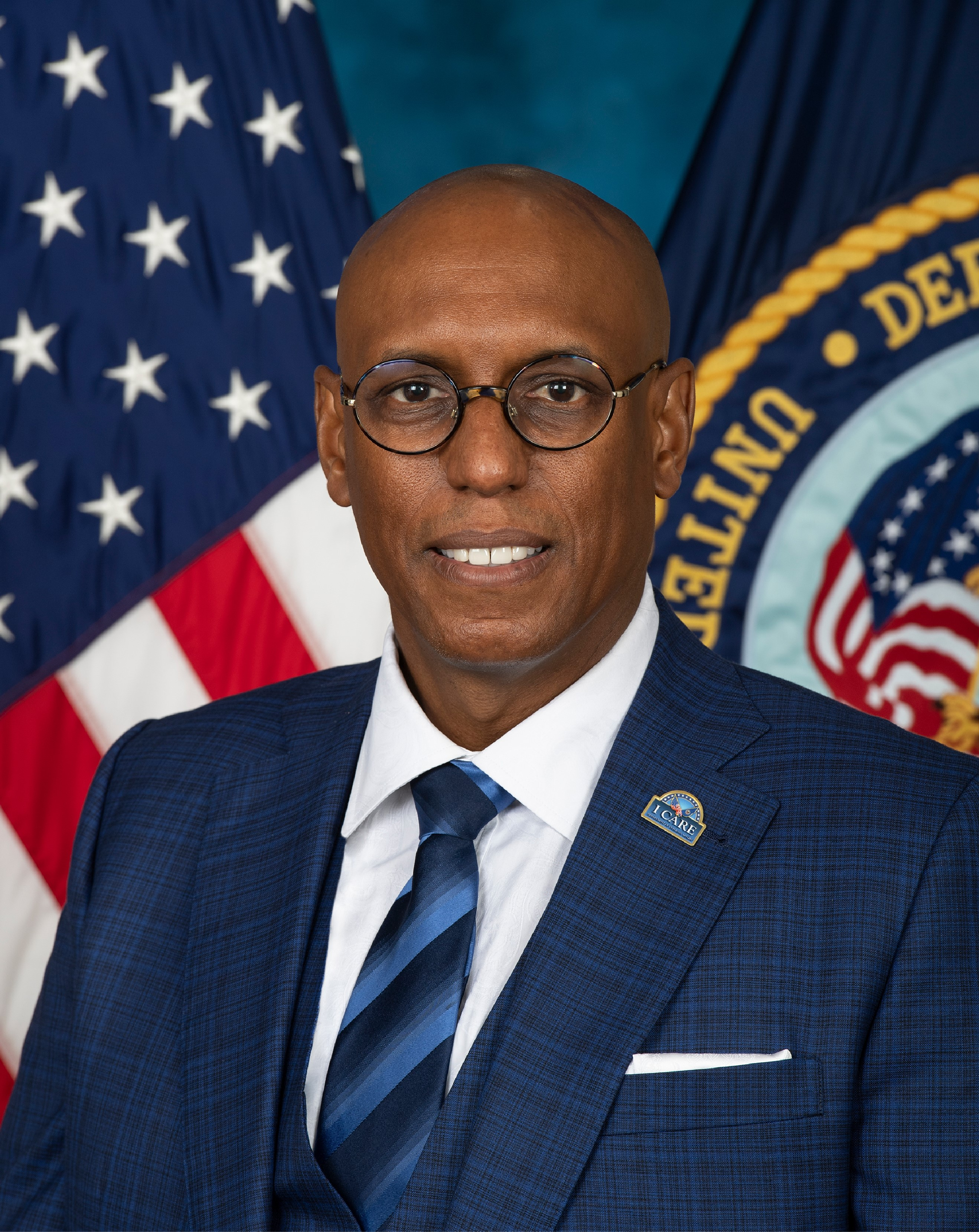
- Official portrait, 2021

9th United States Deputy Secretary of Veterans Affairs
- In office July 19, 2021 – April 1, 2023
- President: Joe Biden
- Secretary: Denis McDonough
- Preceded by: James Byrne
- Succeeded by: Tanya J. Bradsher

Personal details
- Born: February 8, 1967 (age 59) Fort Lee, Virginia, U.S.
- Education: Louisiana State University (BA); Howard University (JD)

Military service
- Allegiance: United States
- Branch/service: United States Army
- Years of service: 1988–1995
- Rank: Captain

Donald Michael Remy (born February 8, 1967) is an American attorney, public servant, businessman, military officer, and athletics administrator and team owner who served as the 9th United States Deputy Secretary of Veterans Affairs under the Biden administration from 2021 to 2023. Previously, he was the chief operating officer and chief legal officer of the National Collegiate Athletic Association (NCAA) from 2011 to 2021 and held senior roles at Fannie Mae from 2000 to 2006. Remy also served as deputy assistant attorney general in the Clinton administration from 1997 to 2000.

== Early life and education ==
Born at Fort Lee, Virginia, recently renamed Fort Gregg-Adams, Remy is the son of MSG (ret.) Donald E. and Ann L. Remy. He graduated from Leesville High School in 1984 alongside his lifelong friend, General Ronald P. Clark. Remy attended Louisiana State University (LSU) on an ROTC Scholarship, earning a bachelor's degree in political science with honors. He was a charter member of Kappa Alpha Psi's Nu Iota chapter. He later graduated with a Juris Doctor from Howard University School of Law.

== Military service ==
Remy served on active duty with the Department of the Army in the Army General Counsel’s Office from 1991 to 1995, advising on major weapons systems acquisitions and research and development agreements. Twice detailed to the Office of the Secretary of Defense, he earned the Meritorious Service Medal and National Defense Service Medal.

== Legal career ==
Following military service, Remy clerked for Judge Nathaniel R. Jones of the United States Court of Appeals for the Sixth Circuit and later, recruited by William T. Coleman Jr. joined O'Melveny & Myers LLP. He transitioned back to public service as deputy assistant attorney general in the Civil Division of the Department of Justice, leading cases involving Waco and Ruby Ridge. He was awarded the Attorney General’s Award for Distinguished Service and the FBI Director Award for Excellence. Remy later became a partner at Latham & Watkins LLP where he handled litigation, internal investigations and chaired the aerospace & defense industry practice.

== Fannie Mae ==
At Fannie Mae, Remy held roles including head of litigation, deputy general counsel, chief compliance officer and senior vice president for multifamily housing. He played a pivotal role in post-Hurricane Katrina housing redevelopment in his home state of Louisiana and along the Gulf Coast. In April 2009, President Barack Obama nominated Remy to be general counsel of the Department of the Army. His nomination was stalled at the Senate Armed Services Committee by Senators John McCain and Mel Martinez around Fannie Mae’s role in the 2008 Financial Crisis. In June 2009 Remy asked President Obama to withdraw his nomination so that it would not be a distraction to the President's agenda. President Obama responded that, “Donald Remy would have been an excellent General Counsel of the Army.”

== NCAA ==
In 2011, Remy became the chief legal officer and later chief operating officer at the NCAA. Together with the Power Conferences, he led legal strategies before the United States Supreme Court in landmark cases, including O’Bannon v. NCAA and NCAA v. Alston, which shaped policies on student-athlete compensation.

== Department of Veteran Affairs ==
President Joe Biden appointed Remy as deputy secretary of veterans affairs in April 2021. He was confirmed by the United States Senate with a bipartisan vote 91-8. At VA he was the chief operating officer of the second largest agency in federal government, where he led improved access to healthcare services, enhanced veteran benefits, and implementation of policies to address the unique needs of veterans and their families. Remy also co-chaired initiatives like the president’s initiative on Customer Experience and VA-DoD Joint Executive Committee. He left office in 2023 and received Meritorious Service awards from the secretary of defense and the secretary of veterans affairs.

== Current roles ==
Remy is the founder and CEO of The Remy Group, a consulting firm advising global organizations. He serves on boards, including the Mayo Clinic, AlixPartners, Granicus, and Verus. In the community, he serves on the board of the Congressional Award Foundation, Congresses only charity which is nonpartisan and gives awards to Americans aged 14–23 recognizing initiative, service and achievements of young people

== DC Power FC ==
Remy is an investor and owner of DC Power Football Club, a United Soccer League (USL) Super League professional women’s soccer team based in Washington, D.C.

== Awards and recognitions ==
Remy has received numerous accolades, including the U.S. President’s Lifetime Achievement Award.

Political offices
Preceded by Carolyn Clancy; Acting	United States Deputy Secretary of Veterans Affairs; 2021–2023	Succeeded by Guy Kiyokawa; Acting
