= Richard Sauber =

American attorney

Richard A. Sauber
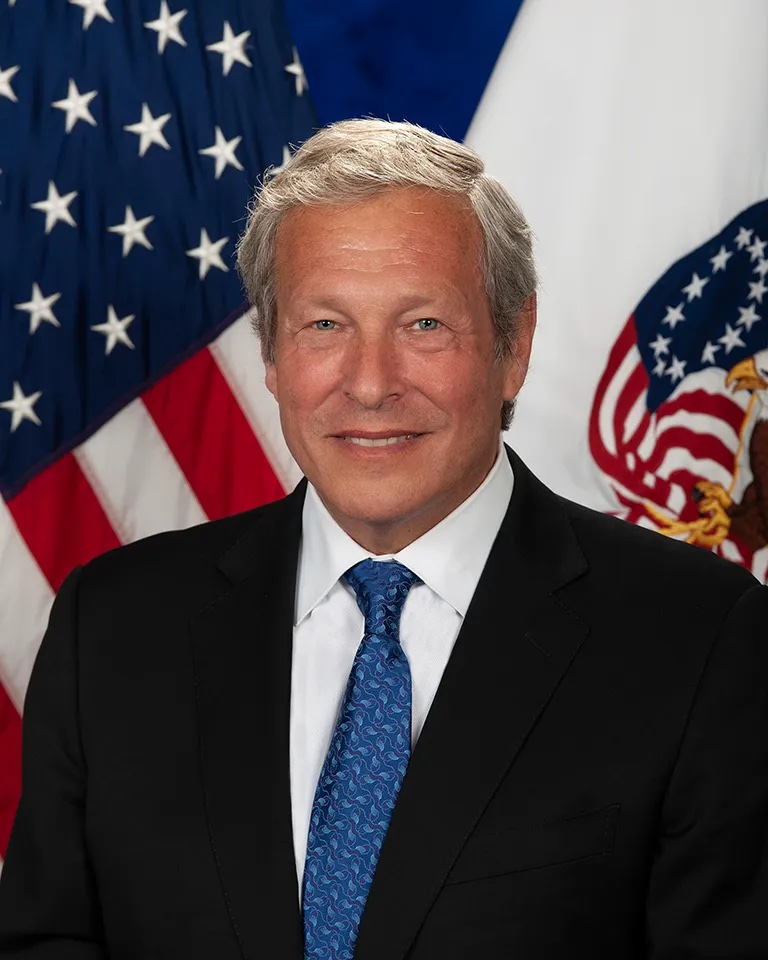

General Counsel of United States Department of Veterans Affairs
- In office May 3, 2021 – June 2022
- President: Joe Biden
- Preceded by: James Byrne
- Succeeded by: James Baehr (2025)

Personal details
- Born: Richard A. Sauber
- Education: Yale University (BA); New York University (JD); Oxford University (MLitt)

Richard Alan "Dick" Sauber is an American attorney who has served as special counsel for President Joe Biden since 2022. He previously served as general counsel at the United States Department of Veterans Affairs from May 2021 until June 2022.

== Early life and education ==
Sauber obtained a Bachelor of Arts from Yale University (where he graduated magna cum laude), a Juris Doctor from the New York University School of Law, and a Master of Letters from Oxford University.

== Career ==
Sauber served as a federal prosecutor and worked with the Reagan administration for pursuing fraud in government contracts. Sauber was also a partner at the law firm Robbins, Russell, Englert, Orseck & Untereiner in Washington, DC, as well as at the law firm Fried, Frank, Harris, Shriver & Jacobson. Sauber also served as an adjunct professor at Georgetown Law School and as general counsel for Freedom House.

=== VA General Counsel ===
On February 19, 2021, President Biden nominated Sauber to be general counsel of the Department of Veterans Affairs. Hearings on his nomination were held before the Senate Veterans' Affairs Committee on April 14, 2021. The committee favorably reported his nomination on April 22, 2021. The United States Senate confirmed Sauber's nomination on April 29, 2021, by voice vote, and he started as general counsel on May 3, 2021.

=== Move to White House ===
On May 14, 2022, it was reported that the White House would hire Sauber in response to the potential for investigations into the Biden administration if Republicans won back control of the United States House of Representatives in the 2022 United States elections. Sauber officially left the Veterans' Affairs Department in June 2022. On various occasions, Sauber declined requests from House Republicans for documents for various investigations into the Biden administration due to them not controlling committees yet.

==== Classified documents controversies ====
In late 2022 and early 2023, various amounts of classified documents were found in several different former offices of President Biden. On January 9, 2023, Sauber announced that classified documents were found in a former office of President Biden's in November 2022. On January 10, 2023, Sauber announced that classified documents were reported to have been found at the Penn Biden Center. On January 14, 2023, Sauber announced more classified documents were found at President Biden's home in Wilmington, Delaware. Sauber has been cooperating with the United States Department of Justice as investigations are ongoing.

=== Return to private law practice ===
Sauber joined the law firm of Kramer Levin Naftalis & Frankel in September 2024, which had combined with Sauber's former firm, Robbins, Russell, Englert, Orseck & Untereiner, in 2022.

== Personal life ==
Sauber is married, and the couple have two daughters.
