= Guy Kiyokawa =

American government official (born 1963)

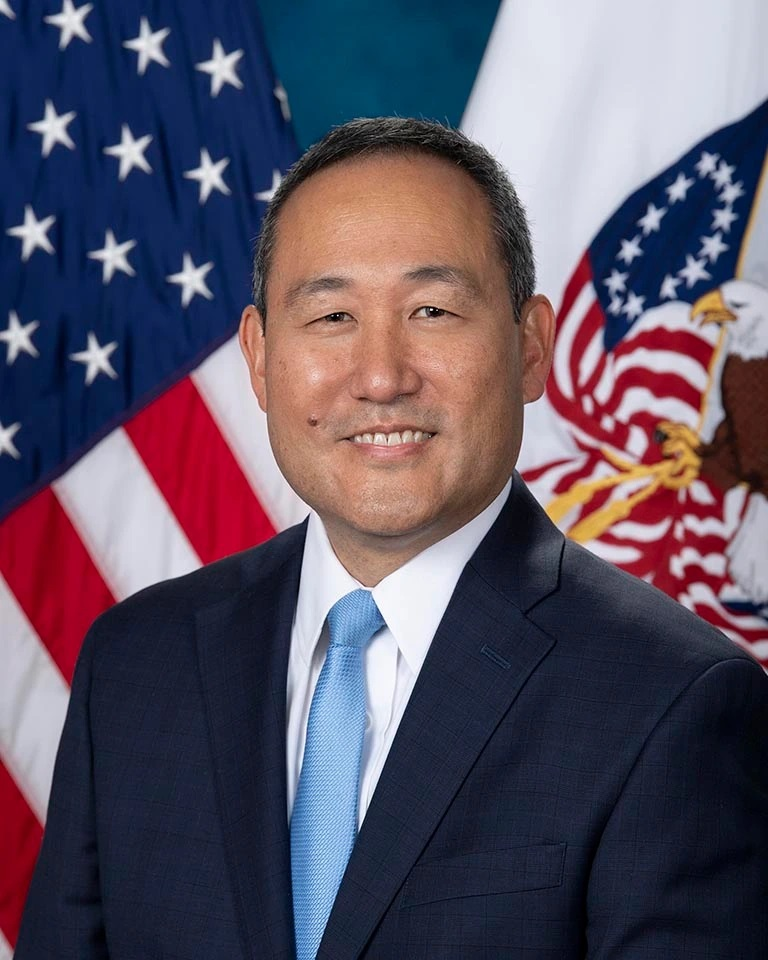
- Official portrait, 2021

United States Assistant Secretary of Veterans Affairs for Enterprise Integration
- In office November 4, 2021 – January 20, 2025
- President: Joe Biden
- Secretary: Denis McDonough
- Preceded by: Dat Tran (acting)
- Succeeded by: TBD

United States Deputy Secretary of Veterans Affairs
- Acting; April 1, 2023 – September 19, 2023
- President: Joe Biden
- Secretary: Denis McDonough
- Preceded by: Donald Remy
- Succeeded by: Tanya J. Bradsher

Personal details
- Born: Guy Toshimitsu Kiyokawa; 1963 (age 62–63) Honolulu, Hawaii, U.S.
- Spouse: Kathryn Samways (m. 1994)
- Education: University of Southern California (BS in civil engineering); Baylor University (MHA)

Military service
- Branch/service: United States Army
- Years of service: 1986–2015
- Rank: Colonel
- Unit: Aviation Branch; Medical Service Corps
- Awards: Defense Super. Serv. Medal; Legion of Merit (2); Meritorious Serv. Medal (7)

Guy Toshimitsu Kiyokawa (born 1963) is an American government official and retired United States Army officer. The United States Department of Veterans Affairs' assistant secretary for the Office of Enterprise Integration since 2021, he served as acting United States Deputy Secretary of Veterans Affairs in 2023, following the departure of Donald Remy.

Military offices
Preceded by Allen W. Middleton	Deputy Director of the Defense Health Agency; 2015–2021	Succeeded by George Appenzeller; Acting
Political offices
Preceded by Dat Tran; Acting	United States Assistant Secretary of Veterans Affairs for Enterprise Integration; 2021–present	Incumbent
Preceded by Donald Remy	United States Deputy Secretary of Veterans Affairs; Acting; 2023	Succeeded by Tanya J. Bradsher
