= Denis McDonough =

American government official (born 1969)

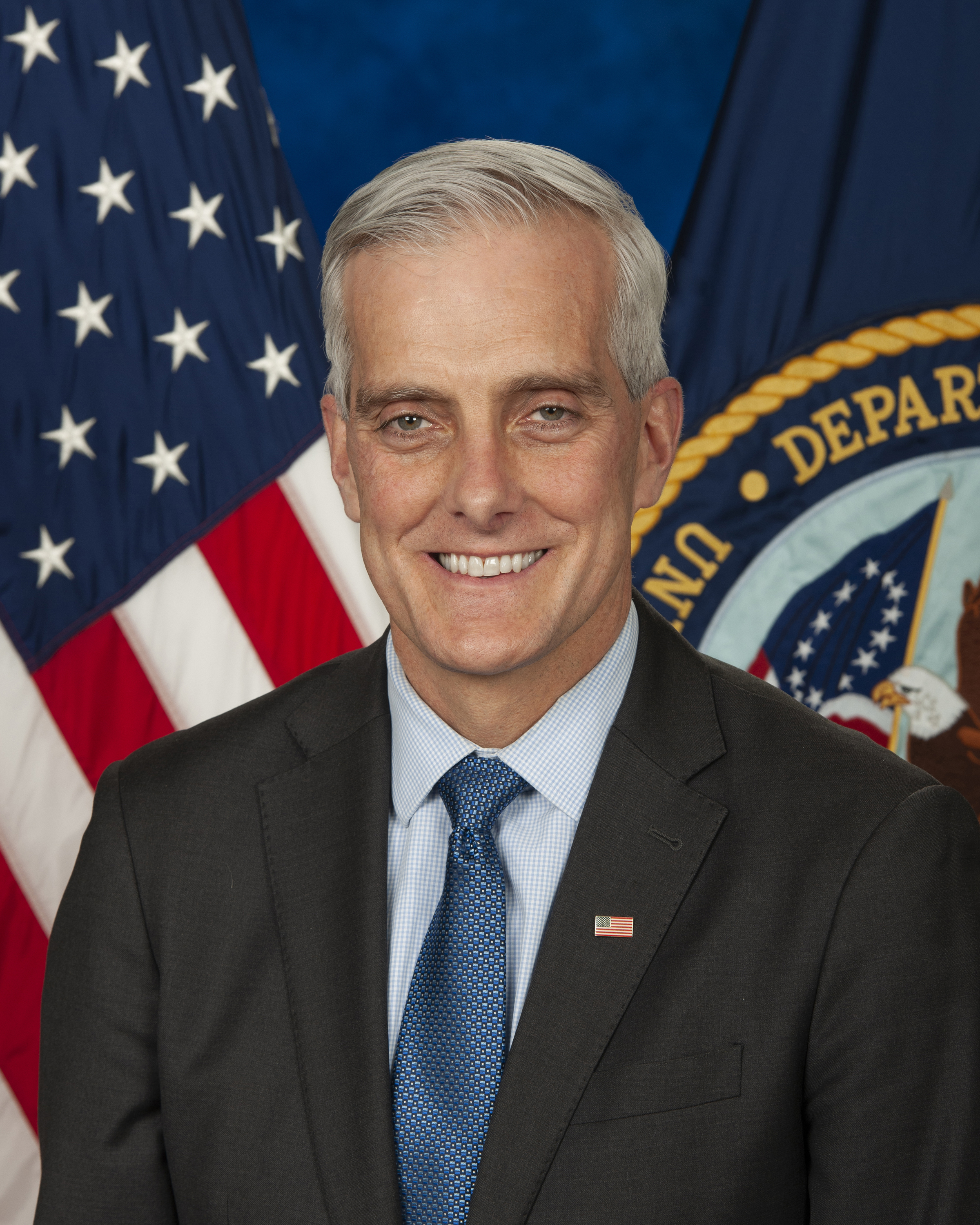
- Official portrait, 2021

11th United States Secretary of Veterans Affairs
- In office February 9, 2021 – January 20, 2025
- President: Joe Biden
- Deputy: Donald Remy; Guy Kiyokawa (acting); Tanya J. Bradsher
- Preceded by: Robert Wilkie
- Succeeded by: Doug Collins

26th White House Chief of Staff
- In office January 20, 2013 – January 20, 2017
- President: Barack Obama
- Preceded by: Jack Lew
- Succeeded by: Reince Priebus

25th United States Deputy National Security Advisor
- In office October 20, 2010 – January 20, 2013
- President: Barack Obama
- Preceded by: Thomas E. Donilon
- Succeeded by: Antony Blinken

Personal details
- Born: Denis Richard McDonough; December 2, 1969 (age 56) Stillwater, Minnesota, U.S.
- Party: Democratic
- Spouse: Karin Hillstrom
- Children: 3
- Education: St. John's University, Minnesota (BA); Georgetown University (MS)
- McDonough's voice McDonough's opening statement at his confirmation hearing to be Secretary of Veterans Affairs. Recorded January 27, 2021

Denis Richard McDonough (born December 2, 1969) is an American government official who served as the 11th United States Secretary of Veterans Affairs from 2021 to 2025 under President Joe Biden.

McDonough served in the Obama administration as chief of staff at the National Security Council from 2009 to 2010 and as Deputy National Security Advisor from 2010 to 2013. He then served as White House Chief of Staff for the full second term of President Barack Obama from 2013 to 2017.

== Early life and education ==
McDonough was born on December 2, 1969, in Stillwater, Minnesota. He was one of 11 children in a devout Irish Catholic family, his grandparents having emigrated from Connemara in the Gaeltacht.

McDonough graduated from Stillwater Area High School in 1988, then attended Saint John's University in Collegeville, Minnesota, He played safety on the Johnnies football team for Hall of Fame coach John Gagliardi, and was a member of teams that won two conference titles in the Minnesota Intercollegiate Athletic Conference. McDonough graduated from Saint John's University with a Bachelor of Arts, summa cum laude, in history and Spanish in 1992. After graduation, he traveled extensively throughout Latin America and taught high school in Belize.

In 1996, McDonough earned an MSFS degree at Georgetown University's Edmund A. Walsh School of Foreign Service.

== Career ==
From 1996 to 1999, McDonough worked as an aide for the United States House Committee on Foreign Affairs, where he focused on Latin America. He then served as a senior foreign policy advisor to Senator Tom Daschle. After Daschle's reelection defeat in 2004, McDonough became legislative director for newly elected Senator Ken Salazar. McDonough was a senior fellow at the Center for American Progress in 2004.

In 2007, Senator Barack Obama's chief foreign policy advisor Mark Lippert, a Navy reservist, was called into active duty. Lippert recruited McDonough to serve as his replacement during his deployment to Iraq. McDonough continued to serve as a senior foreign policy advisor to Obama during his 2008 presidential campaign.

=== Obama administration ===
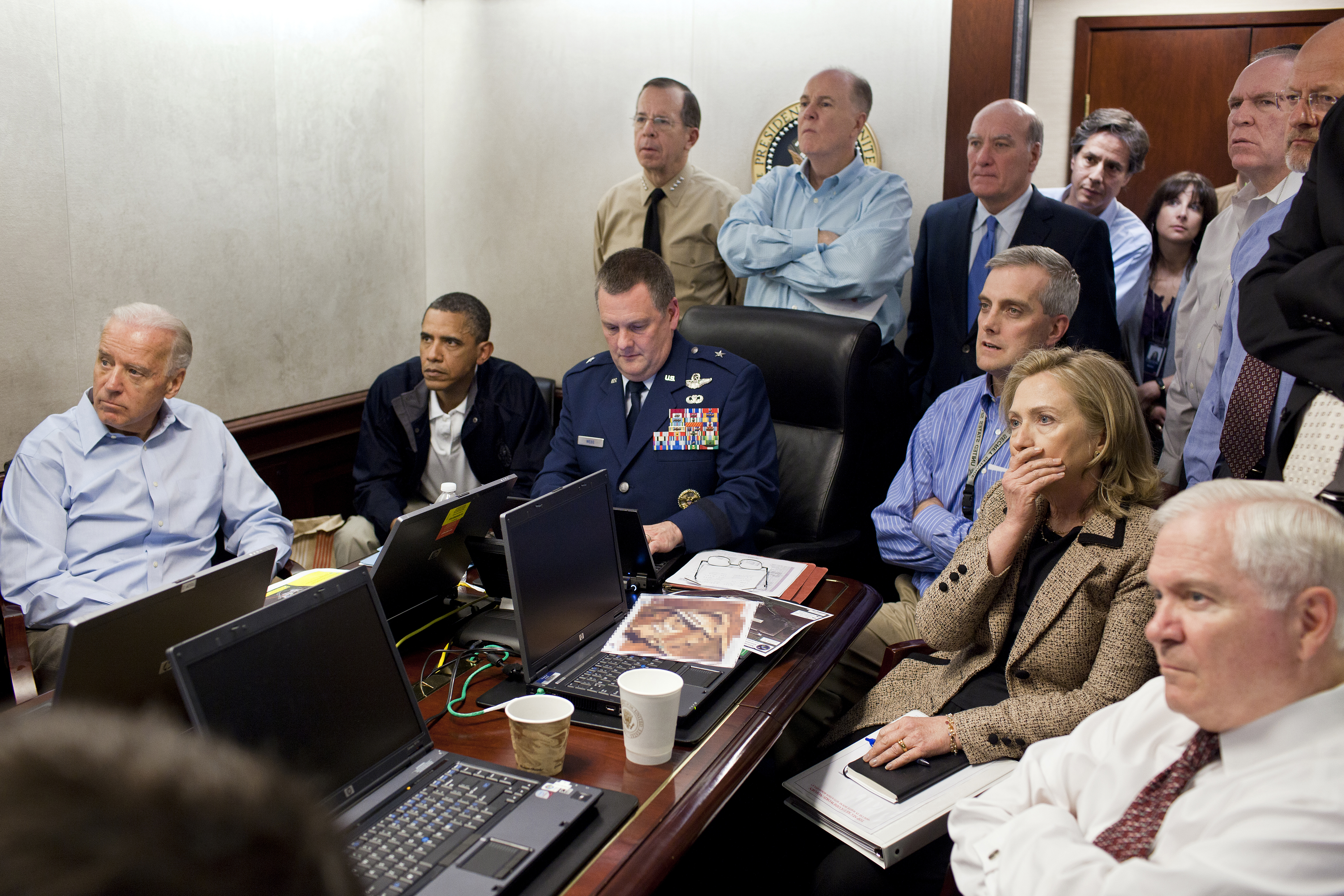
McDonough, seated, third from right in blue shirt, in the Situation Room during the Bin Laden raid.

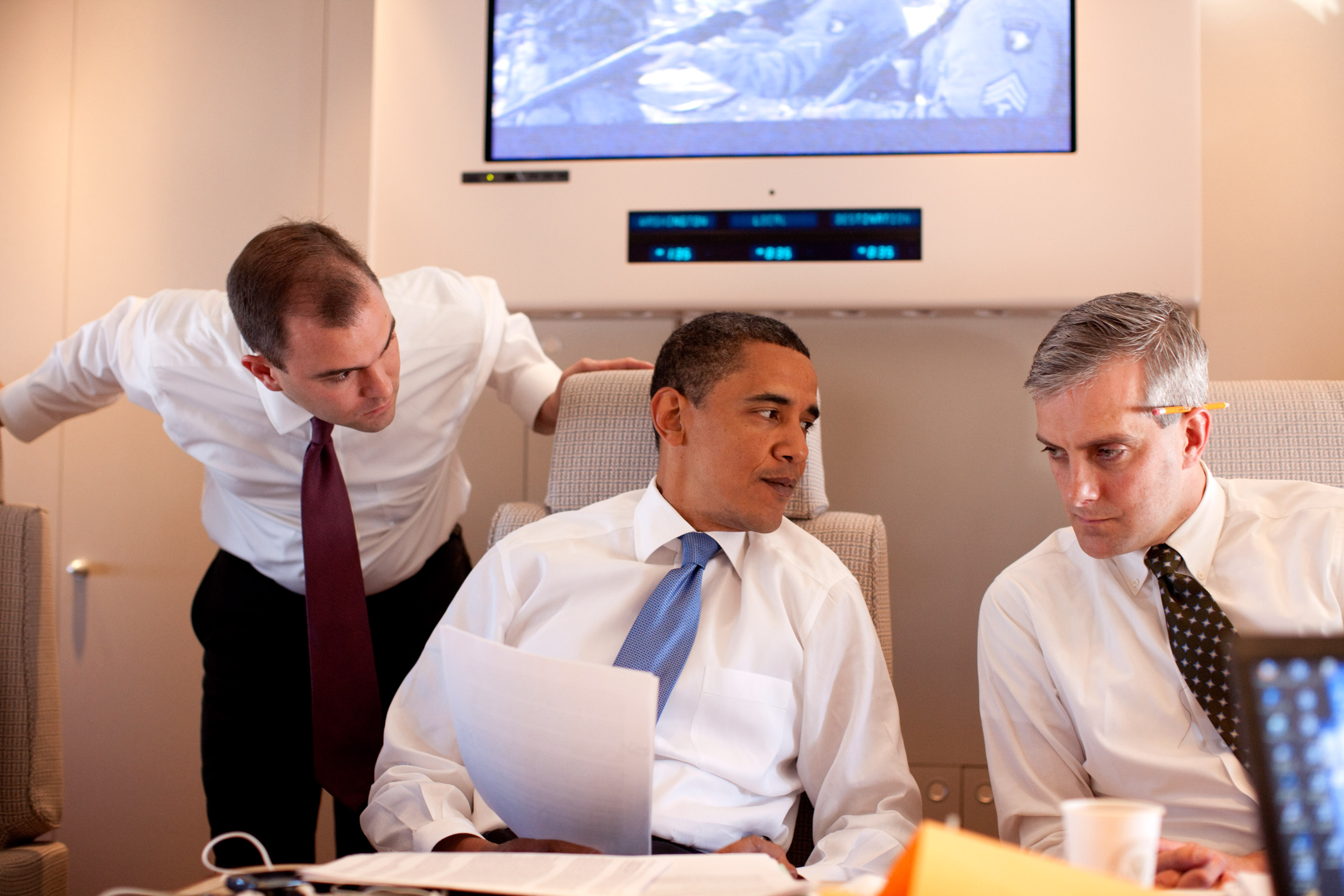
McDonough conferring with Obama about the Cairo Speech, with Ben Rhodes, on June 4, 2009.

After Obama was elected president, McDonough joined the administration as the National Security Council's head of strategic communication. He also served as National Security Council chief of staff.

On October 20, 2010, Obama announced that McDonough would replace Thomas E. Donilon as Deputy National Security Advisor, who had been promoted to succeed General James L. Jones as National Security Advisor. McDonough was seen in photos of the White House Situation Room taken during the monitoring of the May 2011 SEAL operation in Pakistan that resulted in the Osama bin Laden's death.

On January 20, 2013, at the beginning of his second term in office, Obama appointed McDonough his chief of staff. In February 2013 McDonough urged lawmakers to quickly confirm Chuck Hagel and John O. Brennan to their posts in Obama's national security team, expressing "grave concern" about the delays. McDonough served as White House chief of staff through the end of Obama's second term, which ended on January 20, 2017.

=== Return to private life ===
In 2017, McDonough joined the Markle Foundation, a nonprofit that aims to "transform America's outdated labor market to reflect the needs of the digital economy," boost employment opportunities, and expand job training for Americans. As a senior principal, he worked to grow the organization nationwide and broaden its work with governments such as the state of Colorado, public institutions such as Arizona State University, and private companies such as LinkedIn.

McDonough is a professor of the practice at Notre Dame's Keough School of Global Affairs and a visiting senior fellow in Carnegie's Technology and International Affairs Program.

In 2026, McDonough was named as CEO of Feeding America, a non-profit organization of food banks and advocate for policy to ensure food security for all Americans.

=== Secretary of Veterans Affairs (2021–2025) ===
McDonough being sworn in on February 9, 2021

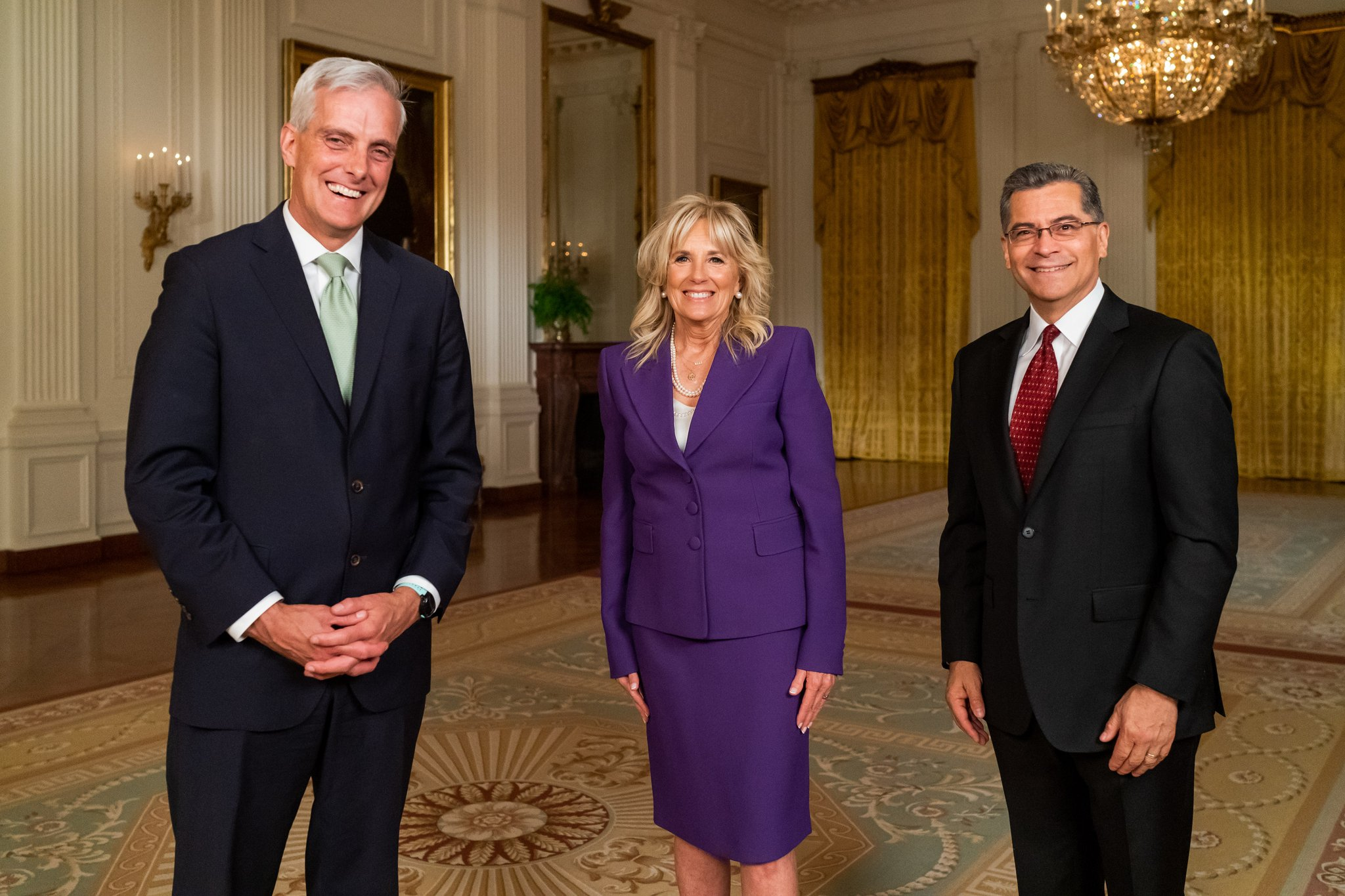
Secretary McDonough with First Lady Jill Biden and Secretary Xavier Becerra, June 4, 2021

President Joe Biden nominated McDonough to lead the United States Department of Veterans Affairs. He appeared before the Senate Veterans' Affairs Committee on January 27, 2021. On February 8, the Senate confirmed McDonough as VA Secretary by a 87–7 vote, with six senators absent. McDonough is the second non-veteran to hold this position. Vice President Kamala Harris swore him in on February 9.

During McDonough's tenure as Secretary of Veterans Affairs, the department implemented the Honoring our PACT Act of 2022, which expanded VA health care and benefits for veterans exposed to burn pits, and other toxic substances. By early 2024, VA reported processing more than one million PACT Act-related claims and broadening health care eligibility to millions of such veterans. The department also reported housing nearly 48,000 veterans experiencing homelessness in permanent housing during fiscal year 2024.

== Personal life ==
McDonough is married to Karin Hillstrom. They have three children. His oldest brother, Kevin, is a Catholic priest of the Archdiocese of Saint Paul and Minneapolis.

Political offices
Preceded by Tom Donilon	Deputy National Security Advisor; 2010–2013	Succeeded by Tony Blinken
Preceded by Jack Lew	White House Chief of Staff; 2013–2017	Succeeded by Reince Priebus
Preceded by Robert Wilkie	United States Secretary of Veterans Affairs; 2021–2025	Succeeded by Doug Collins
U.S. order of precedence (ceremonial)
Preceded by Pete Buttigieg as Former U.S. Cabinet Member	Order of precedence of the United States as Former U.S. Cabinet Member	Succeeded by Jennifer Granholm as Former U.S. Cabinet Member
