= Under Secretary of Veterans Affairs for Benefits =

Under Secretary for Benefits (USB) Department of Veterans Affairs
- Agency seal

- Personal flag of the under secretary of veterans affairs
- Incumbent; Margarita Devlin (Performing the Duties of) since May 15, 2025
- Veterans Benefits Administration
- Reports to: Secretary of Veterans Affairs
- Seat: Washington, D.C.
- Appointer: The president; with Senate advice and consent
- Constituting instrument: Department of Veterans Affairs Codification Act, Pub. L. 102–83, H.R. 2525, 105 Stat. 399, enacted August 6, 1991, as amended
- Precursor: Chief Benefits Officer of the Veterans’ Administration (1991)
- Deputy: Principal Deputy Under Secretary
- Salary: Executive Schedule, Level III $187,300 USD (January 2022)
- Website: www.va.gov/benefits

The Under Secretary for Benefits (USB), in the United States Department of Veterans Affairs, directs the Veterans Benefits Administration through regional offices in 50 states, the District of Columbia, Puerto Rico, and the Philippines. The under secretary is responsible for the administration of benefits provided by the Department to veterans and dependents, including compensation, pension, education, home loan guaranty, vocational rehabilitation, and life insurance.

== History ==
The Veterans Benefits Administration has been in existence since the creation of the Department of Veterans Affairs in October 1988, when it was led by a chief benefits director. In 1994, the title was changed to Under Secretary of Veterans Affairs for Benefits.

On February 27, 2018, President Donald Trump nominated Paul R. Lawrence to become the under secretary of veterans affairs for benefits. The nomination was confirmed by the U.S. Senate on April 26, 2018 by Voice Vote. Mr Reeves was sworn in by SECVA on May 15, 2018. He resigned the post on January 20, 2021.

President Joe Biden nominated Raymond M. Jefferson to serve as the USB on March 21, 2022, but his nomination was withdrawn on July 11. After the nomination was withdrawn, Joshua Jacobs became the acting under secretary while serving as the Senior Advisor to the Secretary of Veterans Affairs, from July 25, 2022 to April 26, 2023. He replaced Thomas J. Murphy, who is the director of the Northeast District, Veterans Benefits Administration. Murphy served as acting Undersecretary twice during his career: from June 2016 through May 2018 and from January 2021 through July 2022.

On January 23, 2023, President Biden announced that he had nominated Jacobs to become the permanent USB. His nomination was confirmed by the Senate on April 26, 2023, and he started at the position on the same day.

== Role and responsibilities ==
The under secretary is appointed by the president and confirmed by the Senate. The occupant of the position is required to be appointed without regard to political affiliation and solely on the basis of his or her demonstrated ability in fiscal management and the administration of programs within the Veterans Benefits Administration or programs of similar content and scope. The under secretary is appointed for terms of four years, and reappointment is possible for successive periods. The president is required to communicate his reasons to Congress if the under secretary for Benefits is removed from office. Whenever there is a vacancy in the position, the secretary of veterans affairs must set up a commission to recommend to the President candidates for appointment.
