= Thomas G. Bowman =

American political aide (born 1946)

Thomas Bowman
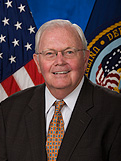
- Bowman, c. 2017

7th United States Deputy Secretary of Veterans Affairs
- In office August 10, 2017 – June 15, 2018
- President: Donald Trump
- Preceded by: Sloan D. Gibson
- Succeeded by: James Byrne

Personal details
- Born: Thomas Gerald Bowman; November 1, 1946 (age 80)
- Party: Republican
- Spouse: Joan Keating
- Education: University of Texas at Austin (BA); Western New England University (JD)

Military service
- Allegiance: United States
- Branch/service: United States Marine Corps
- Years of service: 1969–1999
- Rank: Colonel

Thomas Gerald Bowman (born November 1, 1946) is an American political aide and retired Marine Corps Colonel who served as the United States Deputy Secretary of Veterans Affairs from August 10, 2017, to June 15, 2018, when he retired from active federal service.

Bowman received his Bachelor of Arts in Political Science from the University of Texas at Austin and his Juris Doctor from Western New England University. His nomination was confirmed by the United States Senate on August 3, 2017.

Political offices
Preceded by Sloan D. Gibson	United States Deputy Secretary of Veterans Affairs; 2017–2018	Succeeded by James Byrne
