= Scott Pruitt =

American lawyer and politician (born 1968)

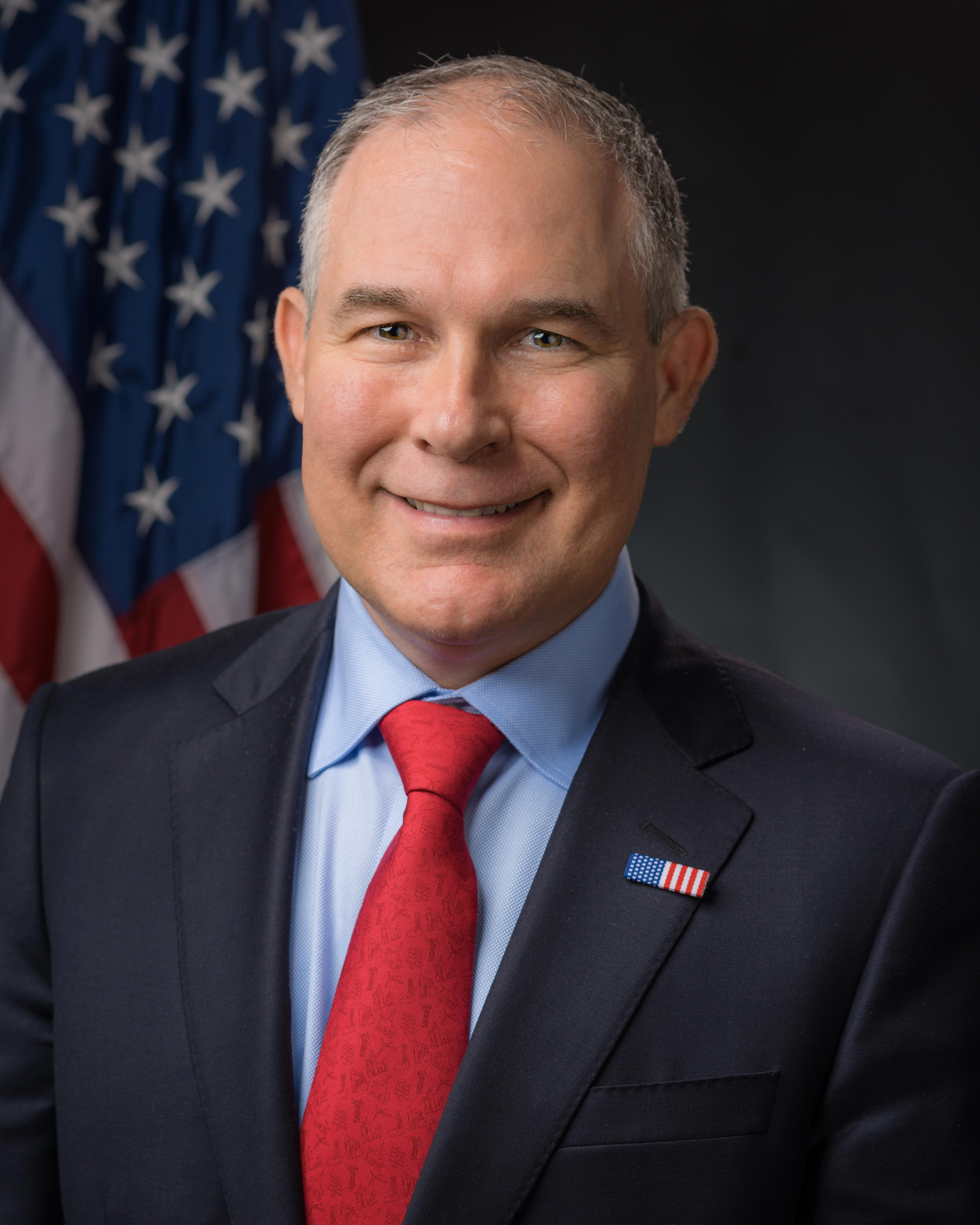
- Official portrait, 2017

14th Administrator of the Environmental Protection Agency
- In office February 17, 2017 – July 9, 2018
- President: Donald Trump
- Deputy: Mike Flynn (acting); Andrew Wheeler
- Preceded by: Catherine McCabe (acting)
- Succeeded by: Andrew Wheeler

17th Attorney General of Oklahoma
- In office January 10, 2011 – February 17, 2017
- Governor: Mary Fallin
- Preceded by: Drew Edmondson
- Succeeded by: Michael J. Hunter

Member of the Oklahoma Senate
- In office January 5, 1999 – January 2, 2007
- Preceded by: Gerald Wright
- Succeeded by: Bill Brown
- Constituency: 54th district (1999–2003); 36th district (2003–2007)

Personal details
- Born: Edward Scott Pruitt; May 9, 1968 (age 58) Danville, Kentucky, U.S.
- Party: Republican
- Spouse: Marlyn Pruitt (m. 1990)
- Children: 2
- Education: University of Kentucky; Georgetown College (BA); University of Tulsa (JD)

Edward Scott Pruitt (born May 9, 1968) is an American attorney, lobbyist and Republican politician from the state of Oklahoma. He served as the 14th Administrator of the Environmental Protection Agency (EPA) from February 17, 2017, to July 9, 2018, during the Donald Trump presidency, resigning while under at least 14 federal investigations. Pruitt denies the scientific consensus on climate change.

Pruitt represented Tulsa and Wagoner counties in the Oklahoma Senate from 1998 until 2006. In 2010, Pruitt was elected Attorney General of Oklahoma. In that role, he opposed abortion, same-sex marriage, the Affordable Care Act, and environmental regulations as a self-described "leading advocate against the EPA's activist agenda." He sued the EPA at least 14 times in the role. Pruitt was elected as chairman of the Republican Attorneys General Association in 2012 and was re-elected for a second term in February 2013. He received major corporate and employee campaign contributions from the fossil fuel industry, taking in at least $215,574 between 2010 and 2014 despite running unopposed in the latter year.

Pruitt was nominated to lead the EPA by President Donald Trump after the 2016 election, and was confirmed by the United States Senate in February 2017 in a 52–46 vote. By July 2018, Pruitt was under at least 14 separate federal investigations by the Government Accountability Office, the EPA inspector general, the White House Office of Management and Budget, the U.S. Office of Special Counsel, and two House committees over his spending habits, conflicts of interest, extreme secrecy, and management practices. Pruitt made frequent use of first-class travel as well as frequent charter and military flights. He leased a condo in Washington, D.C., at a deeply discounted rate from a lobbyist whose clients were regulated by the EPA. Pruitt further caused ethics concerns by circumventing the White House and using a narrow provision of the Safe Drinking Water Act to autonomously give raises to his two closest aides of approximately $28,000 and $57,000 each, which were substantially higher than salaries paid to those in similar positions in the Obama administration, and which allowed both to avoid signing conflicts of interest pledges. Some conservatives joined a growing chorus suggesting that Pruitt should resign. On July 5, 2018, Pruitt announced he would resign from office on July 9, leaving Andrew R. Wheeler as the acting head of the agency.

In April 2022, Pruitt filed to run for the United States Senate to represent Oklahoma in that state's special election to replace Senator Jim Inhofe, who retired. He lost in the Republican primary, garnering 5% of the vote.

== Early life ==
Pruitt was born in 1968 in Danville, Kentucky, the eldest of three siblings, and moved to Lexington as a boy. There, his father, Edward, owned steak houses and his mother, Linda Pruitt Warner, was a homemaker. He was a football and baseball player at Lafayette High School, earning a baseball scholarship to the University of Kentucky, where he played second base. After a year, he transferred to Georgetown College in Kentucky and graduated in 1990 with bachelor's degrees in political science and communications. He then moved to Tulsa, Oklahoma, where he attended the University of Tulsa College of Law and earned a Juris Doctor in 1993.

== Legal experience ==
After law school Pruitt started a solo legal practice in Tulsa that he named "Christian Legal Services," which focused on defending Christians in religious liberty cases. Pruitt worked as a lawyer for five years before running for state senate.

== Early career ==
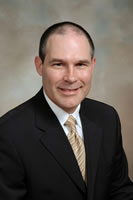
Pruitt in 2003

Pruitt was elected to the Oklahoma Senate in 1998, representing Tulsa and Wagoner counties. In 1999 and again in 2005, Pruitt introduced legislation to establish fathers' "property rights" over unborn fetuses, which meant that a pregnant woman would be required to get the consent of the father prior to an abortion. After two years in the Senate, Pruitt was selected to serve as the Republican whip from 2001 to 2003. He was then selected to serve as the Republican Assistant Floor Leader, a position he held until he left the Senate in 2006. During that time he also sat as the chair of a task force for the American Legislative Exchange Council. There, he worked to put limits on workers' compensation and sponsored a reform bill that sought to impose drug tests on workers who were involved in job injuries or accidents.

In 2001, while a freshman state legislator, Pruitt sought his party's nomination to succeed Steve Largent as the representative for Oklahoma's 1st congressional district but was unsuccessful. In 2003, after his unsuccessful congressional campaign, Pruitt bought a share in a Triple-A baseball team, the Oklahoma City RedHawks, partnering with major Republican donor Robert A. Funk (reportedly for $11.5 million). Pruitt, whose annual salary as a state senator was $38,400, financed his part of the purchase with a loan from SpiritBank. In 2010, they sold the team for an undisclosed profit.

In October 2003, while a state senator, Pruitt purchased a home in Oklahoma City through a shell company, Capitol House L.L.C., in which six partners held equal shares. The buyers included lobbyist Justin Whitefield, healthcare executive Jon Jiles, Robert Funk (who was Pruitt's PAC chairman), and attorney Kenneth Wagner. The home was purchased at about a $100,000 discount from its purchase price of a year earlier and included its furnishings. The seller was Marsha Lindsey, a lobbyist who advocated on behalf of a telecommunications company. Lindsey's loss was partly offset by her employer's retirement package. Pruitt and Whitefield both lived at the home while on business in the state capital. At the time, Whitefield was a registered lobbyist for industry-aligned groups that sought legislative changes to Oklahoma's workers' compensation laws; Pruitt was the major legislative supporter of these efforts. The home was sold by the L.L.C. in 2005, for $470,000. Pruitt failed to publicly disclose his financial relationships with Whitefield and the others, which were revealed by the press in 2018. In 2017, Wagner was hired by Pruitt as the EPA's state and regional affairs adviser.

== Oklahoma Attorney General ==
In 2006 Pruitt sought the Republican nomination to replace outgoing Republican Mary Fallin as Lieutenant Governor of Oklahoma. He was unsuccessful; Fallin later won the gubernatorial election. In 2010, Pruitt again ran for the position of Attorney General of Oklahoma. He won the Republican primary on July 27, 2010, with 56.05% of the vote, defeating Ryan Leonard. Pruitt went on to defeat the Democratic nominee, Oklahoma City defense attorney Jim Priest, in the November 2, 2010, general election with 65.11% of the vote. In 2014 Pruitt ran unopposed in both the primary and general elections.

=== Tenure ===
After winning election in 2010, Pruitt dissolved the Environmental Protection Unit in the Attorney General's office. He stated a desire to increase operational efficiency and shifted the attorneys responsible for environmental protection to the Attorney General's Public Protection Unit and the Solicitor General's Unit. Pruitt stated that "the Oklahoma Department of Environmental Quality – not the Office of Attorney General – has primary responsibility for implementing and enforcing environmental laws in Oklahoma".

Pruitt instead created a "Federalism Unit" in the Attorney General's office dedicated to fighting President Barack Obama's regulatory agenda and suing the administration over its immigration policy, the Patient Protection and Affordable Care Act, and the Dodd-Frank Wall Street Reform and Consumer Protection Act.

Pruitt was successful in raising campaign contributions from the energy industry, helping him to become chairman of the Republican Attorneys General Association. The oil and gas industry contributed over $300,000 to Pruitt's campaigns over the years.

In 2012, Pruitt kept Oklahoma out of the mortgage settlement reached by 49 other states with five national lenders (Ally Financial/GMAC, Bank of America, Citi, JPMorgan Chase, and Wells Fargo), with Pruitt citing differing philosophies of government.

In 2013, Pruitt brought a lawsuit targeting the Affordable Care Act, Oklahoma ex rel. E. Scott Pruitt v. Burwell, alleging that federal cost-sharing subsidies were not authorized by the Act. In King v. Burwell (2015), a decision addressing identical claims brought by other Republican attorneys general, the Supreme Court upheld the federal subsidies, holding that they were authorized under the Act.

In 2013, Harold Hamm, CEO of Continental Resources, co-chaired Pruitt's reelection campaign. Pruitt ran unopposed in the 2014 primary election and won the November 2014 election for a new term as Attorney General. Pruitt then jointly filed a lawsuit against a federal regulation alongside the Oklahoma Gas & Electric and an energy industry group funded by Hamm.

Pruitt's office sued the EPA to block its Clean Power Plan and Waters of the United States rule. Pruitt also sued the EPA on behalf of Oklahoma utilities unwilling to take on the burdens of additional regulation of their coal-fired plants, and criticized the agency in a congressional hearing. As of June 2014, all of Pruitt's lawsuits against the EPA had failed. By January 2017, Pruitt had sued the EPA 13 times.

In 2013, Pruitt supported the Oklahoma legislature's bid to join four other states trying to restrict medical abortions by limiting or banning off-label uses of drugs, via House Bill 1970. After the state Supreme Court upheld a lower court's ruling that the abortion law was unconstitutional, Pruitt requested that the United States Supreme Court review the case. Pruitt was unhappy with the United States Supreme Court's rejection of the Oklahoma case.

In June 2013, Pruitt maintained that the Supreme Court's decision to strike down a provision of DOMA, a federal law that denied federal benefits to homosexual married couples did not affect Oklahoma's laws on the subject.

The Washington D.C. watchdog organization Campaign for Accountability sued Pruitt's successor as Oklahoma Attorney General for the failure of the office to release documentation that had been withheld from the public concerning corruption allegations involving the management of the Tar Creek Reclamation Superfund lead-contaminated waste site near Miami, Oklahoma. In 2014, Pruitt asked Oklahoma's State Auditor and Inspector Gary Jones to audit the financial corruption by contractors performing the cleanup. Pruitt blocked Jones from following his intention to release the audit results.

On March 6, 2014, Pruitt joined a lawsuit targeting California's prohibition on the sale of eggs laid by caged hens kept in conditions more restrictive than those approved by California voters. Less than a week later, Pruitt announced that he would investigate the Humane Society of the United States, one of the principal proponents of the California law. In October 2014, a California judge dismissed the lawsuit, rejecting the arguments of Pruitt and the other attorneys-general concerning California's Proposition 2, a 2008 ballot initiative. Judge Kimberly Mueller ruled that Oklahoma and the other states lacked legal standing to sue on behalf of their residents and that Pruitt and other plaintiffs were representing the interests of egg farmers, rather than "a substantial statement of their populations".

In April 2014, an Oklahoma trial court found the state's execution drug supply law was unconstitutional, and after the Oklahoma Court of Criminal Appeals refused to order a stop to executions, the Oklahoma Supreme Court did. Pruitt then filed a motion arguing that the Supreme Court was acting outside its authority, complaining it was causing a "constitutional crisis". After the Supreme Court refused Pruitt's motion, Governor Mary Fallin faced conflicting court orders, so she issued a declaration rejecting the Supreme Court's authority and scheduling executions. After the state then botched the execution of Clayton Lockett, and the U.S. Supreme Court subsequently approved of Oklahoma's method in Glossip v. Gross, Pruitt asked to delay all scheduled executions in Oklahoma upon discovering executioners had accidentally used the wrong drug in a lethal injection.

Pruitt expressed his dissatisfaction when a federal court ruled that Oklahoma's voter-approved amendment in 2004 to the Oklahoma State Constitution that defined marriage as only the union of one man and one woman was a violation of the U.S. Constitution in 2014. In October 2014, Pruitt criticized the Supreme Court's refusal to hear Oklahoma's appeal in the definition of marriage case.

In November 2014, after the Oklahoma Supreme Court blocked the enforcement of two abortion-related laws until after their constitutionality was litigated (which could take up to a year or more), Pruitt's office communicated the Attorney General's intention to support their implementation and enforcement.

On December 7, 2014, The New York Times published a front-page story highlighting that Pruitt had used his office's stationery to send form letters written by energy industry lobbyists to federal agencies during public comment.

In April 2015, Pruitt wrote a letter to school superintendents stating that schools can lawfully allow the dissemination of religious literature on campus.

In 2015, the Oklahoma Supreme Court rejected Pruitt's defense of the new Ten Commandments Monument on the Oklahoma State Capitol grounds.

In the Op-Ed co-written with Luther Strange in May 2016, Pruitt contended, "...our job is to hold the EPA accountable to the laws that created it and to fulfill our statutory duties ...", "We will continue to pursue those goals and to present our arguments in the courts and in the public square, treating our opponents with the respect they deserve. But we call upon them to press those beliefs through debate, not through governmental intimidation of those who disagree with them. Few things could be more un-American."

In 2016, the U.S. Supreme Court refused to hear Pruitt's original lawsuit against the legalization of cannabis in Colorado.

After the organization Oklahomans for Health collected the legally required number of signatures for a referendum ballot on the legalization of medical marijuana, in August 2016, Pruitt's office moved to rewrite the ballot title, but not in time for the November 2016 election. The measure appeared on the 2018 ballot; Question 788 passed with 57% voting "yes".

Pruitt was an advisor to the Jeb Bush presidential campaign, 2016. In February 2016, he said that Donald Trump would be "more abusive to the Constitution than Barack Obama".

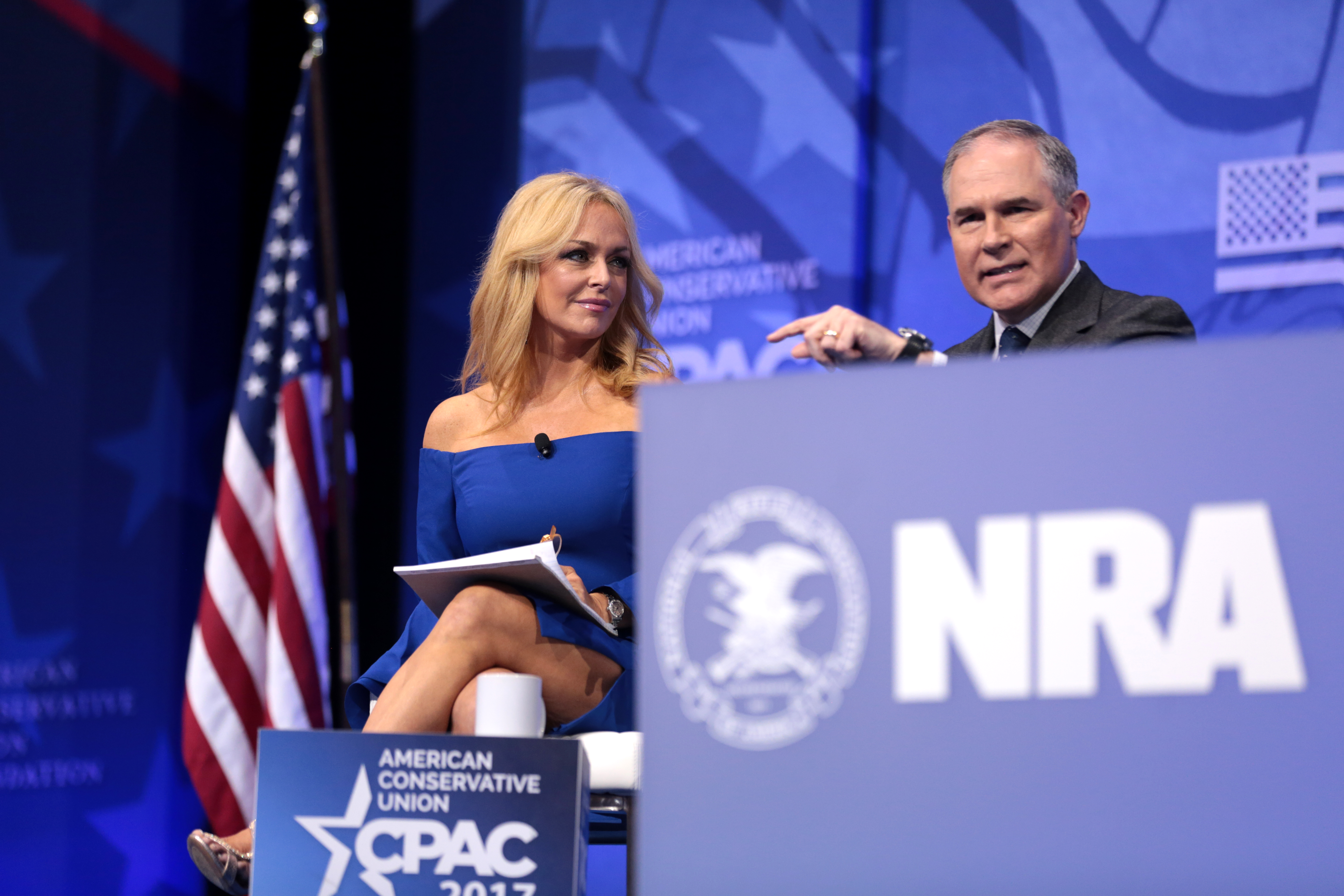
Pruitt at the CPAC in February 2017

In February 2017, Pruitt was ordered by the Oklahoma District Court to release thousands of emails of communication with fossil fuel industries in order to comply with Freedom of Information Act requests filed over a two-year period by the liberal watchdog group Center for Media and Democracy.

The Guardian reported in July 2017 that emails and other records released by the Oklahoma attorney general's office showed a close relationship between Pruitt and various Koch brothers-backed advocacy groups, including the American Legislative Exchange Council. The documents showed that while serving as Oklahoma attorney general, Pruitt "acted in close concert with oil and gas companies to challenge environmental regulations, even putting his letterhead to a complaint filed by one firm, Devon Energy". Devon has since benefited from policies implemented by Pruitt. Emails showed that American Fuel and Petrochemical Manufacturers "provided Pruitt's office with template language to oppose ozone limits and the renewable fuel standard program in 2013".

== Administrator of the Environmental Protection Agency ==
=== Nomination and confirmation ===
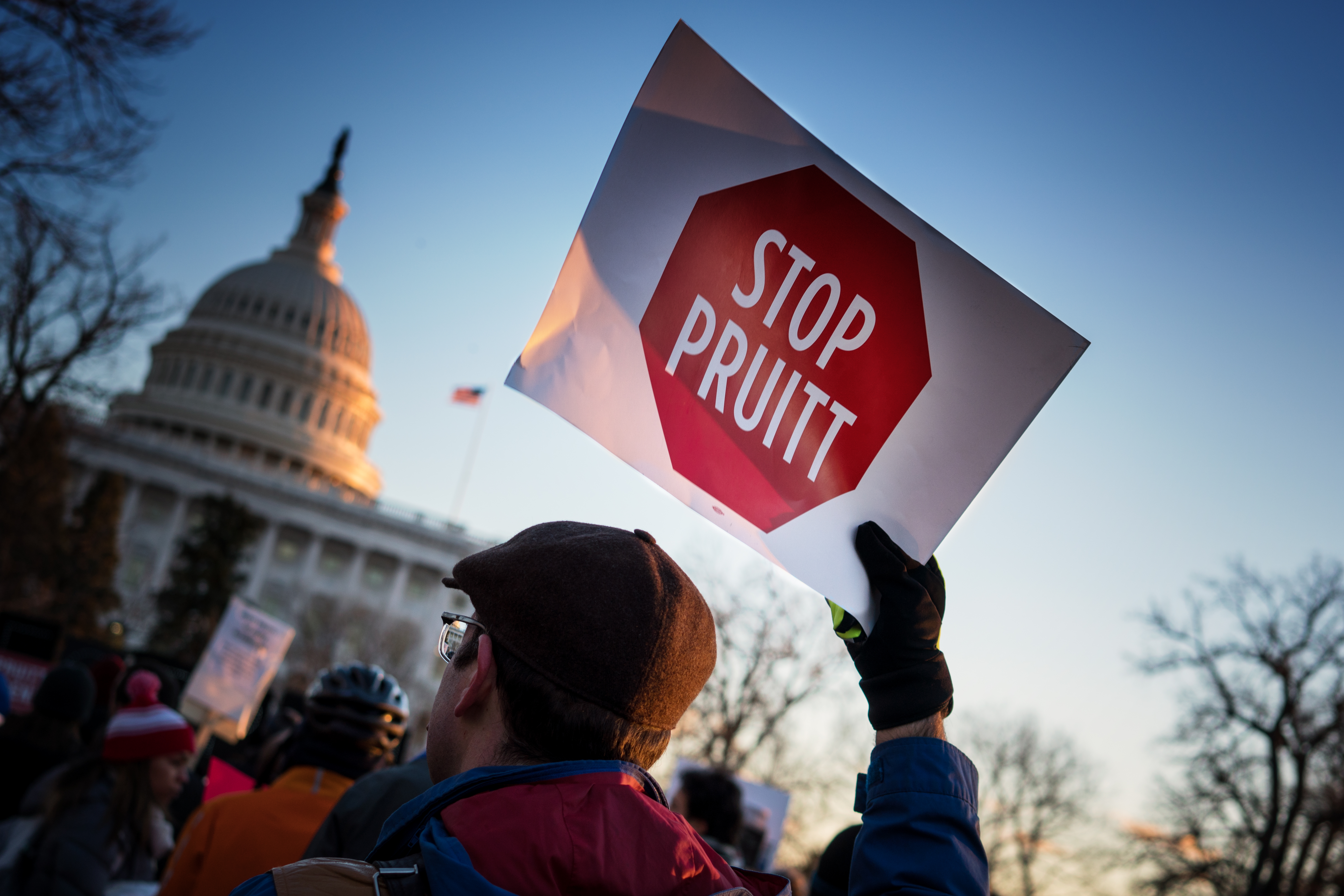
Stop Pruitt sign, at a rally to oppose his nomination

On December 7, 2016, President-elect Donald Trump announced his intention to nominate Pruitt as the Administrator of the Environmental Protection Agency. President-elect Trump said that the EPA had an "anti-energy agenda that has destroyed millions of jobs" and that Pruitt, "the highly respected Attorney General from the state of Oklahoma, will reverse this trend and restore the EPA's essential mission of keeping our air and our water clean and safe." In response to the nomination, Pruitt said, "I intend to run this agency in a way that fosters both responsible protection of the environment and freedom for American businesses."

Pruitt was endorsed by the American Legislative Exchange Council (ALEC). Following Pruitt's nomination hearing, Republican Senator John Barrasso stated that "Pruitt ... has demonstrated his qualifications to lead the EPA." West Virginia Attorney General Patrick Morrisey, who worked with Pruitt on multiple cases, said of Pruitt that "He cares passionately about the rule of law" and that "All the actions he's been involved in are rooted in the firm belief that what the [Obama] administration was doing was unlawful."

Many science advocates and environmentalists voiced concerns about Pruitt's nomination. Gene Karpinski, the president of the League of Conservation Voters said that Pruitt's past actions as Oklahoma AG made the nomination "like the fox guarding the henhouse ... Time and again, he has fought to pad the profits of Big Polluters at the expense of public health." Ken Kimmell, president of the Union of Concerned Scientists, has said, "Pruitt's record gives us no reason to believe that he will vigorously hold polluters accountable or enforce the law ... everything we do know makes it clear that he can't and won't do the job." Saying that Pruitt had deliberately given misleading information about his position on the regulation of mercury emissions, a spokesperson from the Natural Resources Defense Council said, "It is a serious matter to give misleading testimony to Senators during a confirmation hearing." 447 former EPA employees penned a joint letter to oppose Pruitt's nomination, arguing that his lawsuits against the EPA "strongly suggest that he does not share the vision or agree with the underlying principles of our environmental laws" and that they believed that he had not "put the public's welfare ahead of private interests".

Senate Democrats unsuccessfully attempted to delay a vote until after the release of a batch of emails ordered by an Oklahoma judge. On February 17, 2017, the Senate confirmed Pruitt, by a vote of 52–46, to be the Administrator of the Environmental Protection Agency. The vote was mostly along party lines, with Republican Susan Collins voting against, and Democrats Joe Manchin and Heidi Heitkamp voting in favor (Republican John McCain and Democrat Joe Donnelly did not vote). Pruitt was sworn in the same day by Supreme Court Justice Samuel Alito.

=== Tenure as EPA Administrator ===
At the end of 2017, The Washington Post summarized Pruitt's leadership of the EPA in 2017 as follows:

In legal maneuvers and executive actions, in public speeches and closed-door meetings with industry groups, he has moved to shrink the agency's reach, alter its focus, and pause or reverse numerous environmental rules. The effect has been to steer the EPA in the direction sought by those being regulated. Along the way, Pruitt has begun to dismantle former president Barack Obama's environmental legacy, halting the agency's efforts to combat climate change and to shift the nation away from its reliance on fossil fuels.

A 2018 study in the American Journal of Public Health found that in the first six months of Pruitt's tenure as EPA head that the agency had adopted a pro-business attitude unlike that of any previous administration. The study argued "that the Pruitt-led EPA has moved away from the public interest and explicitly favored the interests of the regulated industries." The study found that the agency was vulnerable to regulatory capture and that the consequences for public and environmental health could be far-reaching. According to a 2018 Harvard University analysis, the Trump administration's rollbacks and proposed reversals of environmental rules under Pruitt would under the most conservative estimate likely "cost the lives of over 80 000 US residents per decade and lead to respiratory problems for many more than 1 million people."

In April 2018, Politico disputed the narrative that Pruitt had been effective in overturning Obama's environmental legacy. According to Politico, "Pruitt has yet to create new regulations that would outlast his tenure or Trump's, or to rescind any of the regulations Obama created. He's only been able to delay a few that were already on hold before he took office because they were mired in litigation." The New York Times and The Washington Post noted that while Pruitt was prolific in undoing government regulations, legal experts said that Pruitt did so hastily and through poorly crafted legal arguments that lacked legal, scientific and technical data. As a result, legal experts considered it likely that some of the rollbacks may be reversed in the courts. Legal experts described the legal arguments made by Pruitt's EPA as unprecedented and a departure from previous Republican and Democratic administrations. Rutgers University professor Stuart Shapiro said that while Pruitt had weakened enforcement of existing regulations, he had not been successful at repealing regulations. By April 2018, six of Pruitt's rollbacks had been struck down by courts, and Pruitt had withdrawn two of his proposed rollbacks. Pruitt's legal document outlining the rationale to roll back a regulation on greenhouse emissions from vehicle tailpipes was 38 pages long, lacked the kind of data that courts expect in cases involving environmental regulations, and was mostly direct quotes from public comments made by automaker lobbyists. In contrast, the Obama administration's rationale for implementing the regulation in the first place was 1,217 pages long.

On March 9, 2017, in an interview on CNBC's Squawk Box, Pruitt stated that he "would not agree that" carbon dioxide is "a primary contributor to the global warming that we see" backing up his claim by stating that "measuring with precision human activity on the climate is something very challenging to do and there's tremendous disagreement about the degree of impact." This was in direct contradiction with EPA's public stance that was published on their official website which stated: "Carbon dioxide is the primary greenhouse gas that is contributing to recent climate change". By April 28—the day before the climate change mass protests—EPA announced that the website "would be 'undergoing changes' to better represent the new direction the agency is taking" which included "the removal of several agency websites containing detailed climate data and scientific information" including the site that "had been cited to challenge Pruitt's Squawk Box statements." A March 9 analysis by fact-checking website Snopes.com found that "Pruitt's statements to CNBC are misrepresentative of the scientific consensus on carbon dioxide's role as a greenhouse gas—a consensus that has essentially existed for more than a century." The Atlantic published an article on the same day, pointing out that in 2007, the United States Supreme Court had acknowledged the link between carbon dioxide and global warming—in 2013 the Intergovernmental Panel on Climate Change stated the probability of carbon dioxide causing global warming was at least 95%.

Pruitt's chosen deputy, chief of staff, and deputy chief of staff are all former members of Senator Jim Inhofe's (R-OK) staff. Pruitt picked Washington State senators Don Benton and Doug Ericksen to be, respectively, a White House liaison and a regional administrator. Andrew R. Wheeler was nominated to be Pruitt's deputy administrator. Pruitt's principal deputy at the EPA's Office of Chemical Safety and Pollution Prevention was previously an executive at the American Chemistry Council. In December 2017, Michael Dourson withdrew his nomination to be Pruitt's assistant administrator.

The President's first budget instructs Pruitt to cut the agency's budget by 24% and reduce its 15,000 employees by 20%. Pruitt has sought to end EPA funding for the United States Department of Justice Environment and Natural Resources Division, which relies on $20 million a year from the EPA for 27% of its budget. Pruitt has issued a directive to stop litigants from pressuring the EPA to regulate, referring to the practice as "sue and settle". In response, 57 former EPA counsels signed a letter criticizing Pruitt's directive. Pruitt has offered himself as a replacement of U.S. Attorney General Jeff Sessions.

On April 28, 2017, Pruitt fired scientists from the agency's 18-member Board of Scientific Counselors (BOSC), indicating he intended to replace them with industry representatives. Ryan Jackson, Pruitt's chief of staff, asked the BOSC's chair to change testimony she had submitted before a May 23 hearing of the House Science Committee, causing her to complain she felt "bullied."

In October 2017, Pruitt removed several scientists from EPA advisory panels and forbade any scientist who receives a grant from the EPA from then serving those panels. By December 2017, 700 staff had left EPA during Pruitt's tenure, including over 200 scientists. During that time, Pruitt hired 129 people, including 7 scientists. In March 2018, Pruitt proposed to restrict the EPA from considering research that relies on confidential information, such as medical data. The proposal was modeled on a stalled Congressional bill. It was expected that by August 2017, 47 of 58 serving scientists would have been removed from their positions, though they typically serve three year terms and which are renewed after they first expire. In April 2020, Pruitt's directive was found to have been arbitrary and capricious by the unanimous United States Court of Appeals for the District of Columbia Circuit.

On June 29, 2017, Pruitt attended a board meeting of the American Coalition for Clean Coal Electricity, and told them that he will have researchers publicly debate the human role in climate change, adopting Steven E. Koonin's suggestion to hold a "red team blue team" exercise. In December 2017, White House Chief of Staff John F. Kelly rejected the debate idea. Pruitt has met with industry representatives almost daily while rarely meeting with environmentalists.

Pruitt and other agency heads delayed the public release of the Climate Change Report within the National Climate Assessment. The report was ultimately released in November 2017.

In August 2017, the Environmental Integrity Project determined that the administration was collecting 60% less money in civil environmental penalties than prior administrations. Pruitt has sought injunctive relief valued at 12% of that sought by the prior administration. As of January 2018, the administration had removed, relaxed, or delayed 67 environmental rules.

In March 2018, Time magazine reviewed the status of the EPA's website after a year of Pruitt's tenure. The magazine reported that the website's Climate Change section was taken down in April 2017 after existing in various forms for more than twenty years. The message, "This page is being updated", was left in its place. In addition, searching for "climate change" produced 5,000 results compared to the previous 12,000. Resources on how local communities could combat climate change were cut from 380 to 170 pages, and a 50-page resource on "a Student's Guide to Global Climate Change" was not archived. On some pages, edits have been made to remove terms like "climate change", "air pollutant", "greenhouse gas", while "carbon footprint" and "carbon accounting" were replaced with "environmental footprint" and "sustainability accounting".

Calling Pruitt on March 2, 2018, President Trump assured him, "we've got your back," urging him to "keep fighting," according to administration officials who remained anonymous. However, two additional officials confirmed that presidential Chief of Staff John F. Kelly had expressed the administration's displeasure over being caught unaware by some of the ethical problems Pruitt's conduct raised. Senate Environment Committee Chair John Barrasso of Wyoming, supported Pruitt, as did Senators Rand Paul and Ted Cruz.

Former coal lobbyist Andrew Wheeler's nomination as Deputy Administrator was submitted to become Pruitt's deputy in 2017, but was not confirmed. It was resubmitted in 2018. He was confirmed as Deputy Administrator of the EPA on April 12, 2018, by a mostly party line vote of 53–45, which included three Democratic Senators, Joe Manchin, Heidi Heitkamp, and Joe Donnelly.

=== Secrecy ===
In contrast to prior EPA administrators since its founding in 1973, Pruitt neither provided lists of scheduled public speaking events nor disclosed most trips until afterward. He avoided news conferences. On one occasion journalists who became aware of an event beforehand were ejected from a venue after an EPA official threatened to call law enforcement. Looking at a recent batch of documents released through a Sierra Club FOI request, the New York Times commented that it appeared that the Pruitt schedulers divided people into "friendly" and "unfriendly" camps and noted one case where a meeting was kept so secret that even the meeting hosts were confused about it. Commenting on Pruitt's claim that his unusually extensive security expenses were related to his need for security, the New York Times said, "[The documents] show that the agency's close control of Mr. Pruitt's events is driven more by a desire to avoid tough questions from the public than by concerns about security, contradicting Mr. Pruitt's longstanding defense of his secretiveness."

A Freedom of Information Act request from the Sierra Club showed that between February and December 2017, Pruitt had only sent one e-mail to anyone outside EPA from his government e-mail account, leading to questions of whether Pruitt was using a private account to conduct government business.

An EPA official said that Pruitt and his top aides kept "secret" schedules and calendars to hide controversial meetings with industry representatives, destroying or altering records that might reflect poorly on Pruitt. A review by CNN of internal EPA emails and the official EPA calendar found discrepancies in Pruitt's official EPA calendar with more than two dozen meetings and calls omitted. Legal experts said that the practices of keeping a secret calendar and destroying or altering records with the intent to deceive the public could be considered a violation of federal law.

=== Controversies ===
Due to the multiple ongoing scandals involving Pruitt, at least 20 members of Congress, including three Republicans (Carlos Curbelo, Ileana Ros-Lehtinen and Elise Stefanik), called for his resignation. Curbelo said that Pruitt's "corruption scandals are an embarrassment to the Administration, and his conduct is grossly disrespectful to American taxpayers." On April 3, 2018, Senator Sheldon Whitehouse (D-RI) and Congressmen Ted Lieu (D-CA) and Don Beyer (D-VA) called for an investigation of Pruitt's housing arrangements by the EPA's inspector general. House Oversight Committee Chairman Trey Gowdy, a Republican, started a probe into Pruitt in early April 2018 over his housing arrangements. President Donald Trump defended Pruitt, saying "Rent was about market rate, travel expenses OK. Scott is doing a great job!" By early April 2018, Politico reported that the number of mushrooming scandals, leaks and staff disapproval of Pruitt's expenditures and ethical conflicts had created chaos at the EPA and put morale at an all-time low. Three Republican Senators joined the criticism, including Susan Collins, who had voted against his confirmation, as well as South Carolina's Lindsey Graham and Louisiana's John Neely Kennedy. Kennedy said, "Now these are unforced errors. They are stupid. There are a lot of problems we can't solve. But you can behave." South Dakota Senator Mike Rounds defended Pruitt on Meet the Press, however, referring to the criticism by saying, "I don't know how much of it is overblown and how much of it is accurate, to be honest." On June 5, 2018, Iowa Republican Senator Joni Ernst said Pruitt "is about as swampy as you get here in Washington, D.C., and if the president wants to drain the swamp, he needs to take a look at his own cabinet."

Two of Pruitt's top aides—senior counsel Sarah Greenwalt, and director for scheduling and advance Millan Hupp—were reported on June 6, 2018, to be resigning from the EPA. Both Greenwalt and Hupp were Pruitt associates from Oklahoma and had come under scrutiny regarding various controversies during his EPA tenure. When contacted for comment by a reporter from The Atlantic, EPA spokesman Jahan Wilcox declined to comment apart from saying, "You have a great day, you're a piece of trash." That same day, Trump stated, "People are really impressed with the job that's being done at the EPA. Thank you very much, Scott."

Pruitt came under the scrutiny of the United States Office of Government Ethics regarding potential violations of Title 5 of the Code of Federal Regulations (CFR), which specifically incorporates, "Employees shall not use public office for private gain," and "Employees shall endeavor to avoid any actions creating the appearance that they are violating the law or the ethical standards set forth in this part."

Emails generated by EPA staffers, when Pruitt was the nominee for the EPA post, showed he considered running the agency at least part-time from Tulsa, his hometown, and sought office space in that city that would include room for his security detail. House Democratic committee members requested details from the EPA about his plans to open a Tulsa office, citing ethical concerns. "Establishing a new EPA office in Tulsa may be personally convenient for you, but it seems ethically questionable, professionally unnecessary, and financially unjustified," they wrote in a May letter to Pruitt. EPA staff emails said Pruitt required a "secure cabinet or safe" as well as a secure room to receive classified information from President Donald Trump and his cabinet members. He also wanted the latitude to work from home at times. They ventured that the "optics" of receiving donated office space would be a public relations problem for Pruitt. An additional issue was the EPA didn't want the cost of such a space to appear as a line item in a congressional bill.

==== Management of agency ====
EPA employees reported that the doors to the floor in the EPA's headquarters containing Pruitt's office were frequently locked, and employees were required to have escorts while visiting the floor. Some EPA employees also reported being told not to bring cellphones or take notes in meetings with Pruitt. Pruitt was also accompanied by armed guards even while at EPA's headquarters, an unprecedented level of security for an EPA administrator. Pruitt also ended the longstanding practice of making public the appointments of the administrator and other top agency officials. These measures prompted critics to charge that Pruitt was running the agency in secret.

Five officials at the EPA – four of them high-ranking – were reassigned, demoted or pushed out of the EPA after they raised concerns about Pruitt's management of the agency, in particular Pruitt's expenditures. Several of these officials played a key role in reviewing Pruitt's travel plans; on occasions they put a halt to unjustifiably expensive travel plans. One political appointee was put on leave after voicing concerns about Pruitt to the White House's presidential personnel office. The New York Times reported that the appointee had objected to proposals considered by Pruitt's staff to buy a $100,000-a-month charter aircraft membership, spend $70,000 on two desks for Pruitt's office, and spend $43,000 on a sound-proof security booth. The appointee first asked Pruitt privately to rein in his spending, but then did it through intermediaries after he got frozen out.

Early in his tenure, Pruitt asked his security detail to use flashing lights and sirens when they were stuck in D.C. traffic. Eric Weese, the lead agent of his security detail, told Pruitt that flashing lights and sirens were only used in emergency circumstances. One of the instances included a trip to Pruitt's favorite French restaurant in D.C. Less than two weeks later, the lead agent was reassigned. Weese had also expressed a reluctance to sign off on requests that Pruitt needed to travel first class for security reasons. Agency staff questioned requests for a bulletproof sport utility vehicle, the construction of a special security booth in Pruitt's office, the tripling of the size of Pruitt's security detail, and the 24/7 work hours of his security detail. Reginald E. Allen, a career official at the EPA, was reassigned to an office within the EPA described as "an unmarked grave" after he objected to Pruitt's spending. Pruitt replaced Weese with Pasquale "Nino" Perrotta, a former Secret Service agent operating a private security company. Perrotta obtained a waiver to maintain outside employment while also heading Pruitt's security detail. Under Perrotta, there was a rapid expansion of Pruitt's security detail, as he signed off on various requests by Pruitt's team. Perrotta also wrote an email to five EPA officials which indicated that it was Pruitt's preference to use lights and sirens on his vehicle.

During a trip to Italy, the EPA hired Italians to further support Pruitt's security detail who were reportedly friends of Perrotta. Perrotta traveled first class with Pruitt and shared, along with his men, a five-course meal with Pruitt at a restaurant in Rome (it is rare for security personnel to dine with those they are protecting). Perrotta also hired the vice president of his private security company to conduct bug sweeps in Pruitt's office (typically conducted by government personnel) and install biometric locks on doors at a cost of approximately $9,000. After Kevin Chmielewski, a former campaign staffer for Donald Trump, refused to retroactively approve return first class travel from Morocco for Pruitt's aide, Samantha Dravis, Perrotta ordered him to relinquish his staff credentials, and Chmielewski was terminated from his position. Chmielewski had also raised concerns regarding other expenditures and the ethics of Pruitt's condo lease. Besides Weese, Reginald E. Allen was moved to a job where he had less say in spending decisions and less interaction with Pruitt. A third career official, John E. Reeder, was told to find a new job and John C. Martin, who also served on the security detail, was removed from the team and had his gun and badge taken away after questioning how Pruitt's security was being handled. A sixth official, Mr. Pruitt's chief of staff, Ryan Jackson, also raised questions about Mr. Pruitt's spending, according to unnamed EPA officials, remaining in his position, but who considered resignation.

In June 2018, it was reported that Pruitt had used agency staff to perform nonofficial duties for Pruitt. He tasked members of his security detail to run errands like picking up his dry cleaning and driving him around to search for a favorite moisturizer. Pruitt also tasked staffers to look for apartments and to purchase a used mattress for his personal use.

===== Freedom of Information Act requests =====
As EPA administrator, Pruitt maintained four different email addresses. This prompted two Democrats on the Senate Committee on Environment and Public Works to request that the EPA inspector general look into "whether the agency has properly searched these email addresses for responsive documents in response to Freedom of Information Act (FOIA) requests."

Under Pruitt, EPA Chief of Staff Ryan Jackson created a pilot program to "centralize" FOIA requests that go through the various sub-offices that make up EPA's Office of the Administrator, as revealed by released emails. In internal emails from August 2017 (later turned over to the Natural Resources Defense Council), Jackson and another top Pruitt aide (Liz Bowman, the head of EPA's Office of Public Affairs) complained that career EPA officials had released records in response to a FOIA request from a news organization (E&E News), when such records could have been withheld for several additional weeks. The aides directed that they be notified prior to any release of Pruitt-related material. This approach was criticized by FOIA experts; Nate Jones, director of the FOIA Project at George Washington University's National Security Archive said the process "does look like the most burdensome review process that I've seen documented."

Pruitt hired the former treasurer of his political action committee, Elizabeth Beacham White to run the EPA office that handles Freedom of Information Act requests for Pruitt's office. The office run by White has been slow to meet FOIA requests, far exceeding legal deadlines and causing a massive surge in court challenges. Pruitt's office had the slowest response rate to FOIA requests of any section of the EPA.

==== Expenditures ====
Pruitt drew controversy in the late summer and fall of 2017 over his use of taxpayer funds. Unlike his predecessors, Pruitt has, as EPA head, regularly flown first or business class on commercial airlines, as well as chartered private jets and military planes at exorbitant costs. The cost of Pruitt's seats on those flights are often several times higher than the seats for his accompanying staffers. Pruitt also has a vastly larger around-the-clock security detail than his predecessors.

In August 2017, the inspector general of the EPA launched a probe into Pruitt's travel to and from Oklahoma at taxpayer expense. In September 2017, it was revealed that Pruitt had used at least $58,000 worth of noncommercial charter flights and military flights during his tenure, and when traveling on commercial airlines had opted for business or first class when those seats were available. In February 2018, a Washington Post investigation determined that Pruitt has thus far spent hundreds of thousands of dollars on first-class airline travel, charter flights, military aircraft and luxury hotel stays, potentially contravening federal travel regulations and contrary to the practices of his predecessors, who routinely traveled in economy class. On June 5, 2017, for example, Pruitt billed the government for a $1,641.43 first-class ticket on a flight from Washington, D.C. to New York.

Pruitt defended his unprecedented travel costs as necessary for security reasons. His spokesman told The Hill that Pruitt has a "blanket waiver" to travel regulations which normally prohibit first-class travel by federal employees. Pruitt's staff later elaborated that the security reasons included other passengers being uncivil, quoting one individual yelling a vulgarism at him, referring what he was doing to the environment. Despite the purported security threats to Pruitt, he opted to travel in coach on flights home to Oklahoma when taxpayers were not paying for his travel. Furthermore, according to a former top aide, Pruitt refused to stay at hotels which had been vetted by the U.S. Embassy while traveling abroad, opting instead for more expensive and less secure hotels.

Pruitt frequently opted to fly with Delta Air Lines, despite US government contracts giving discounts on certain routes. According to one of Pruitt's former top aides, Pruitt wanted to fly Delta so that he could collect more frequent flyer miles. During one trip, Pruitt used Emirates, a Dubai-based airline, requiring a waiver from the Fly America Act, which normally requires federal employees to travel on American-owned airlines. Pruitt also tended to stay at high-end hotels during his trips. Pruitt was found to have spent 43 of the 92 days from March to May 2017 in Oklahoma or traveling there.

In September 2017, the EPA spent what was thought to be $25,000 to build a soundproof booth for Pruitt to use in his office. The EPA's spokesperson said that this was to protect against hacking and eavesdropping. In March 2018, it was revealed that the cost of the booth was even higher than initially reported; actually almost $43,000. Christine Todd Whitman, EPA Administrator under George W. Bush, noted that there was already a secure phone booth in the building. In April 2018, the Government Accountability Office concluded that Pruitt's purchase of the $43,000 soundproof booth violated federal spending laws.

The EPA also swept for bugs in Pruitt's office and installed biometric locks on his office doors, at a cost of approximately $9,000. In September 2017, it was reported that Pruitt's security detail had increased to 18 people who guarded him around the clock, which was without precedent in size for an EPA chief. Additional agents for Pruitt's security detail were reassigned from the EPA's Criminal Investigation Division, which more typically investigates environmental crimes. The EPA justified the size of the detail, saying that it was because Pruitt faced greater security threats. However, an internal EPA report showed that EPA intelligence officials concluded there was no justification for the expansion of Pruitt's security detail and that there were no specific credible security threats against Pruitt; the career EPA official who approved the report was later dismissed. The Associated Press failed to find any case where someone had been charged or arrested for threatening Pruitt. In October 2017, CNN reported that Pruitt had requested a dozen more agents, which would cost the taxpayers at least $2 million per year in salaries alone. By June 2018, the costs of Pruitt security was more than $4.6 million.

In April 2018, it was reported that Pruitt's aides had researched leasing a private jet on a monthly basis for Pruitt's travel. The estimated cost of this would have been approximately $100,000 per month. The aides evaluated such expenditures prior to the outbreak of a similar scandal regarding exorbitant travel costs by Health and Human Services Secretary Tom Price, which later led to Price's resignation.

In April 2018, it was also reported that Pruitt had two of his aides and three security agents sent on a trip to Australia in August 2017 to set up future meetings for him; the five staff members flew business class, costing taxpayers a combined $45,000 for airfare alone. Each ticket cost $9,000 (an economy class ticket would have cost approximately $1,400). Pruitt's trip to Australia was canceled due to Hurricane Harvey.

Responding to allegations of ethics violations, in April 2018, thirty-nine members of the Senate and more than 130 members of the House of Representatives called for Pruitt's resignation.

In June 2018, it was reported that Pruitt had spent approximately $1,500 on 12 customized fountain pens from a Washington jewelry store.

==== 2017 Morocco trip to encourage U.S. LNG sales ====
In 2018, Pruitt faced increased scrutiny concerning a December 2017 trip to Morocco. The trip was disclosed via a press release after Pruitt had returned. During the trip, Pruitt met with Moroccan officials to discuss the bilateral Morocco-U.S. agreement and promoted the export of liquified natural gas (LNG) to Morocco. Pruitt and his entourage spent four days in Morocco and some additional time in Paris, which an EPA spokesman said was due to weather delays. Pruitt's travel expenses for the trip cost $17,631; the costs for Pruitt's 10-person entourage were not disclosed.

In May 2018, Le Desk revealed that Richard Smotkin, a former Comcast lobbyist and long-time friend of Pruitt's, arranged the trip to Morocco. In April 2018, Smotkin received a $40,000-a-month contract (retroactive to January 2018) with the Moroccan government to lobby on behalf of the country. Ethics experts said that it was highly unusual for individuals outside of government to arrange trips such as these and that the trip raised questions as to whether it was intended to financially benefit Smotkin.

Pruitt's Morocco trip was controversial, prompting criticism from Democrats and from the Sierra Club, and prompting an expanded inquiry from the EPA inspector general. In a letter to Pruitt asking him to explain the trip, Senator Sheldon Whitehouse (D-RI) noted that the five-day trip consisted of one full workday, two days with a one-hour meeting for each, and a two-day, non-work layover in Paris over a weekend. Critics also said that Pruitt's trip was improper because the export of liquified natural gas (LNG), a fossil fuel, falls outside the EPA's mission of ensuring clean air and water, and because the Energy Department and Federal Energy Regulatory Commission, not the EPA, oversee the export of LNG. At the time of the trip, Pruitt's landlord's lobbying firm represented the only U.S. domestic exporter of LNG.

In December 2017, Senator Tom Carper (D-DE) wrote a letter to the EPA Inspector General, requesting that the IG expand the scope of the pending audit concerning Pruitt's travel to include the Morocco trip. In response to Carper's letter, "the IG said he would expand the scope of the investigation of Pruitt's travel costs through the end of 2017 and would look at whether EPA followed all policies and procedures."

In April 2018, Pruitt released his travel itinerary for the Morocco trip in response to Freedom of Information requests, but the bulk of the itinerary had been redacted.

==== Housing arrangements ====
In March 2018, it was reported that Pruitt had leased a condominium townhouse in Washington D.C. from a lobbyist couple, Vicki and Steven Hart, at a price of $50 per night, which amounted to $6,100 over a six-month period. The average price for Airbnb lodging in the same neighborhood is $142 per night. Pruitt's adult daughter also stayed for months in the condo's second bedroom while a White House intern, but was not charged for her stay.

The Harts' firm was registered to lobby on behalf of at least a half a dozen clients in industries regulated by the EPA, including Canadian energy company Enbridge. At the same time that Pruitt was renting the condo, the EPA approved Enbridge's plan to expand a pipeline carrying oil to the United States from Canadian tar sands. Enbridge had in 2010 been given the second-largest fine in EPA history for spilling crude oil into the Kalamazoo River in Michigan.

A Pruitt spokesperson denied any link between the condo rental and the agency approvals, but government ethics experts said that the situation raised an appearance of a conflict of interests that made it reasonable to question the EPA's decision. In May 2018, emails showed that Hart had asked Pruitt to get three people appointed to the EPA's Science Advisory Board. The three people were recommended by a company that Hart lobbied on behalf of.

In March 2018, EPA's Designated Agency Ethics Official and principal deputy general counsel, Kevin Minoli, wrote that Pruitt's lease, which as drafted provided Pruitt with access to a single unlocked bedroom at a rate of $50 per night for the nights used up to a maximum of 37 nights, was not a violation of federal gift rules because of the limited use provided by the lease and the availability of other temporary housing in the area for a similar price. However, Minoli emphasized he had only evaluated the narrow terms of the lease itself, not any other activities or benefits provided outside of the lease that the document did not address. Minoli issued a second memorandum on April 4, 2018, providing additional explanation of his determination and the factual information he considered. As to allegations that Pruitt's daughter stayed in a separate bedroom, Minoli's memorandum did not opine on the implication of those or other allegations explaining that to evaluate them "would have required factual information that was not before" the ethics office. Minoli's memorandum also explained that it was limited only to the question of whether the rental agreement constituted a gift and "did not address other portions of the Federal ethics regulations such as the impartiality rule. Other apartments in the building complex, located in a prime location less than a block away from the U.S. Capitol, rented for as much as $5,000 per month. Furthermore, when the EPA ethics official reviewed the undated lease document, the name of the husband who had EPA interests had been struck through by Vicki Hart and her own name had instead been handwritten in. The owners were issued a notice of infraction by the District of Columbia because they lacked a license to rent out rooms. Pruitt's landlords gave him notice that he would have to move by July 2017, and changed the locks on the doors when he departed. On June 30, 2018, four days before Pruitt's resignation, the New York Times reported that Minoli had referred multiple allegations against Pruitt to the EPA's Inspector General, including aspects of Pruitt's use of the Hart's condo.

The townhouse rented by Pruitt was also used as a Republican fundraising hub while he and his adult daughter were living there. The Harts hosted a fundraising reception for Pruitt in 2014 (at the expense of $1,616.43) and contributed $1750 to Pruitt's campaign for Oklahoma attorney general over the period 2010–2012.

On March 29, 2017, Pruitt's security detail, unable to reach him, broke down the front door to the apartment building to gain entrance. The EPA eventually reimbursed the condo association $2,460 for the necessary repairs.

In July 2018, it was reported that Pruitt had requested help from two EPA aides, both of whom were attorneys, in a dispute that he had with a separate landlord.

==== No-bid contract to Republican opposition research firm ====
In December 2017, Definers Public Affairs was paid $120,000 in a no-bid contract from the EPA for services which included searching for "resistance figures" opposing Pruitt's agenda. During the bid Definers listed itself erroneously as a "small disadvantaged business", a preferred designation corrected after Definers received the contract. Definers canceled the contract following a public backlash.

==== Oklahoma associates' hiring and salary increase ====
In April 2018, it became known that Pruitt had raised the salaries of two of his closest aides whom he'd brought from Oklahoma, despite rejection of the submitted increases by the White House. Pruitt sought to increase the salary from $107,435 to $164,200 for one aide and from $86,460 to $114,590 for the other. The provision was intended to allow the EPA administrator to hire specialists into unique roles in especially stressed offices. Instead, Pruitt circumvented the process by using a provision of the Safe Drinking Water Act which allowed him to autonomously determine the salaries for the two aides. The compensation of the two staffers was substantially higher than the salaries of staff in similar positions in the Obama administration. The method of raising their pay also allowed both to avoid signing ethics pledges meant to deter conflicts of interest, an issue raised by Democratic Senators Tom Carper and Sheldon Whitehouse for consideration of an investigation. While Pruitt claimed in an April 4, 2018 televised interview with Fox News correspondent Ed Henry that he didn't know anything about the raises to his two close aides, the Washington Post reported on April 5, 2018, that two EPA officials and a White House official told The Post that Pruitt instructed staff to award substantial pay boosts to both women, who had worked in different roles for him in Oklahoma.

Pruitt hired former Oklahoma banker Albert Kelly to head the Superfund program, which is responsible for cleaning up the nation's most contaminated land. Kelly completely lacked any experience with environmental issues, and had just received a lifetime ban from working in banking, his career until then, due to "unfitness to serve". The Federal Deposit Insurance Corporation (FDIC) also fined him $125,000 and said he had made loans that harmed the bank. Kelly had a long-standing financial relationship with Pruitt as head of a SpiritBank, which held extensive outstanding loans to Pruitt. In his new position, Kelly earned $172,100 a year.

==== Abusive use of lights and sirens on government-issued car ====
Pruitt repeatedly pressured his federal security detail to speed and use emergency sirens and lights when he was late for engagements, on one occasion in the wrong direction into oncoming traffic to pick up dry cleaning before a meeting. The internal report substantiating whistleblower allegations was completed in 2018 but not released until May 2022.

==== White House Dining Room ====
Pruitt ate frequently at the White House Mess, a restaurant seating only 50 that provides fine dining at bargain prices and is available only to senior officials and is not intended for daily use. He ate there so frequently that it triggered push back from the White House cabinet affairs team and criticism from the press and public.

==== Reactions from ex-EPA administrators ====
Former EPA Administrators have been critical of Pruitt's tenure. William Ruckelshaus, the first and fifth EPA Administrator under Richard Nixon and Ronald Reagan respectively, characterized Pruitt as disbelieving of "the mission of the agency" while believing that the EPA was "over-regulating". Ruckelshaus accused Pruitt of having an "ideological approach ... that affects the large contributors in his party in Oklahoma". Ruckelshaus also described the ideological opposition to the scientific consensus on climate change as a national "threat", and that "lives will be sacrificed" with further inaction. Ruckelshaus has also criticized Pruitt for lacking transparency.

Carol Browner, EPA Administrator under Bill Clinton, said, "Under Pruitt, what they're doing is conscientiously tearing the place down." Christine Todd Whitman, EPA Administrator under George W. Bush, said it was "mindless" that under Pruitt, policies enacted under Obama were being reversed regardless of their merits or shortcomings. Gina McCarthy, EPA Administrator under Barack Obama, said that Pruitt's EPA had created a "wealth of uncertainty" in undoing so many regulations because businesses would not know if they should "take rules seriously".

The EPA's overhaul of their website under Pruitt has also drawn flak from former administrators. Whitman has argued that the website's credibility was damaged, and that "undermining science means there is no basis on which to act based on fact, which is dangerous." McCarthy described the EPA's website changes as "censoring scientific data" and carrying out "a dangerous assault on public health safeguards that protect all Americans."

==== Establishment of legal defense fund ====
At a May 16, 2018 hearing of the Senate Appropriations Committee's Interior, Environment and Related Agencies Appropriations Subcommittee, Pruitt affirmed that he had set up a legal defense fund that will enable "friends, allies, lobbyists and others" to help defray any legal costs Pruitt may face due to numerous charges of spending and ethics violations. Maryland Democrat Chris Van Hollen asked Pruitt if sources of donations would be publicly disclosed. Pruitt agreed they would be and added that his attorney would be working with the General Accounting Office (GAO) to assure the fund met legal requirements. The subcommittee's ranking member, New Mexico's Tom Udall remarked, "It's hard to know what to begin with today. Every day, there seems to be a new scandal, and you at the center of it." Subcommittee Chairwoman, Alaska Senator Lisa Murkowski stated said she's "constantly asked" about his management of the agency, continuing, "I think there are legitimate questions that need to be answered."

==== Special favors for family members ====
In June 2018, it was revealed that Pruitt had used his official position at the EPA to line up special favors and business opportunities for his wife and daughter. Three months after being sworn in as head of the EPA, Pruitt's scheduler sent an email to Dan Cathy, the chairman, president, and CEO of fast-food chain Chick-fil-A, about "a potential business opportunity". The business interest entailed granting Pruitt's wife, Marlyn, license to set up a Chick-fil-A franchise. Pruitt also approached the CEO of Concordia, a New York nonprofit organization which sets up summits to build public-private partnerships, about hiring his wife to plan summits. Pruitt also had a top EPA aide contact major Republican donors for job opportunities for his wife. When one such donor said that it would be a conflict of interest to offer a job to Pruitt's wife, Pruitt continued to solicit the donor's help in finding job opportunities. The Judicial Crisis Network ended up hiring Pruitt's wife temporarily after Leonard Leo, executive vice president of the Federalist Society, sent the group her resume. Federal ethics law prohibits public officials from using their public positions for private gain. Pruitt instructed one of his aides to contact the Republican Attorneys General Association about finding a job for his wife, but the aide refused as she considered it an ethics violation.

Pruitt also instructed at least three EPA aides to help secure a White House internship for his daughter, after which she received such a post. Pruitt obtained Rose Bowl tickets via the head of a firm, Saxum, doing public affairs work for energy companies. Representative Elijah Cummings requested documents pertaining to assistance Pruitt received to obtain the prized tickets. The Oklahoma City-based firm represented Plains All American Pipeline LP, which has a pending petition at the EPA to permit discharge of hydrostatic test water from a Corpus Christi, Texas, pipeline. Pruitt's security detail accompanied the family to the game.

=== Resignation ===
Following the assorted ethics and management scandals, Pruitt announced on July 5, 2018, he would be resigning effective July 9. Following Pruitt's resignation, EPA Deputy Administrator Andrew R. Wheeler became acting administrator. The EPA Office of Inspector General continued its probes of Pruitt after the resignation, but in November 2018 the EPA Inspector General's Office closed two probes as inconclusive because it could not interview Pruitt after his resignation. (The office lacks the ability to subpoena officials who have resigned.)

== Post-EPA career ==
After resigning from the EPA, Pruitt has sought to establish an energy consulting business. He promoted overseas coal sales for coal baron Joseph Craft III. The Washington Post reported that Pruitt had meetings with officials from the same industries that he regulated while EPA head. Pruitt's lawyer said that Pruitt had not and would not violate the five-year ban on lobbying the EPA. On April 18, 2019, Pruitt registered as a compensated lobbyist with the Indiana Lobby Registration Commission specifying that he anticipates his lobbying efforts would relate to energy and natural resources. His sole client listed is connected to Sunrise Coal, which operates four coal mines in the state at the time of the filing.

=== U.S. Senate candidacy ===
In April 2022, Pruitt announced his candidacy for the U.S. Senate in the special election to replace retiring Senator Jim Inhofe. He received 18,052 votes (5.0%) in the Republican primary, coming fifth out of 13 candidates, as Markwayne Mullin and T. W. Shannon advanced to a runoff election.

== Pruitt's environmental views ==
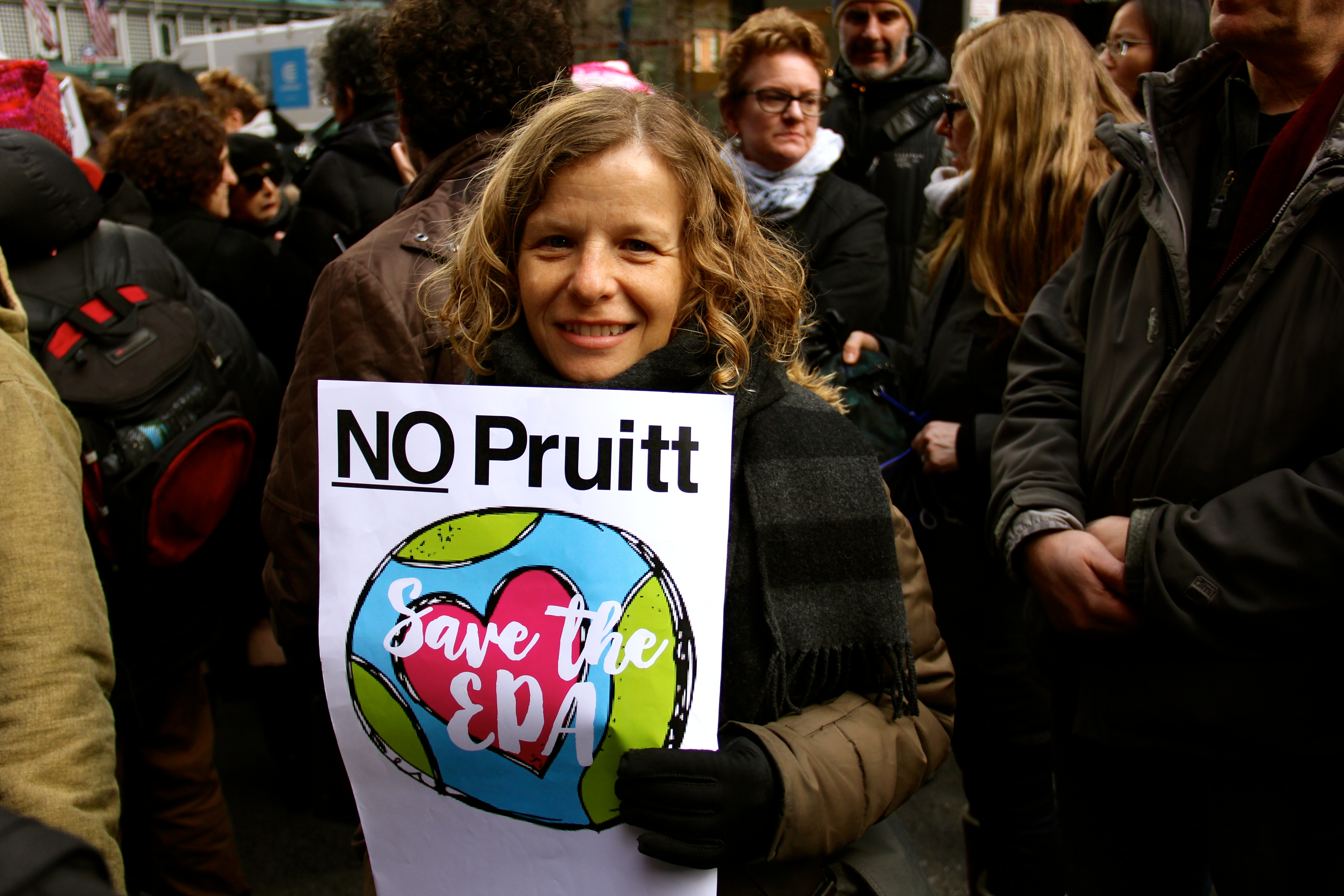
Resist Trump Rally, NYC, 2017

=== Rejection of scientific consensus on climate change ===
Pruitt rejects the scientific consensus on climate change. During his January 18, 2017, confirmation hearing to be EPA Administrator, he said that "the climate is changing, and human activity contributes to that in some manner". In March 2017, Pruitt said that he does not believe that human activities, specifically carbon dioxide emissions, are a primary contributor to climate change, a view which is in contradiction with the scientific consensus. On June 2, 2017, Pruitt acknowledged that global warming is occurring, and that "human activity contributes to it in some manner." However he added "Measuring with precision, from my perspective, the degree of human contribution is very challenging."

In May 2016, Pruitt and Luther Strange authored an op-ed in the National Review criticizing a group of Democratic attorneys general for investigating ExxonMobil in connection with the ExxonMobil climate change controversy. In part, Pruitt and Strange wrote:

[The global warming] debate is far from settled. Scientists continue to disagree about the degree and extent of global warming and its connection to the actions of mankind. That debate should be encouraged — in classrooms, public forums, and the halls of Congress. It should not be silenced with threats of prosecution. Dissent is not a crime.

Additionally, Pruitt joined 12 other Republican attorneys general in writing a letter that stated that "If it is possible to minimize the risks of climate change, then the same goes for exaggeration. If minimization is fraud, exaggeration is fraud."

According to one person, Pruitt suggested debates to President Trump, stating to him, "We can show that most scientists don't even believe in global warming." Trump was said to have liked the idea, but the concept was rejected by White House Chief of Staff John F. Kelly, according to several officials involved in the discussions.

A May 2017 study in Scientific Reports examined Pruitt's claim that "over the past two decades satellite data indicates there has been a leveling off of warming." The study found that the claim was false: "Satellite temperature measurements do not support the claim of a "leveling off of warming" over the past two decades".

In an interview with Las Vegas television station KSNV, Pruitt, in contradiction to the EPA's own scientific position, argued that an increase in global temperate might not be "a bad thing" and that it is "arrogant" to say what "the ideal surface temperature should be in the year 2100."

Pruitt opposes the Paris Agreement. He has incorrectly asserted that China and India have "no obligations" until 2030 under the Paris Agreement.

=== Lawsuits against the Environmental Protection Agency ===
Pruitt has described himself as "a leading advocate against the EPA's activist agenda." Upon taking office as Oklahoma Attorney General, Pruitt established a "federalism unit" to fight "unwarranted regulation and systematic overreach" by the federal government, a first-of-its-kind. Andrew Miller, a former Democratic attorney general of Virginia who later represented energy companies, recalled a meeting in 2013 with Pruitt and other attorneys general: "[t]he issue of the day was discussed in a way that allowed Attorney General Pruitt, to his credit, to emerge as one of the leaders, if not the leader with respect to energy issues among the attorneys general."

As Oklahoma Attorney General, Pruitt sued the EPA at least 14 times. Regulated industry companies or trade associations who were financial donors to Pruitt's political causes were co-parties in 13 of these 14 cases. These cases included suing to block the anti-climate change Clean Power Plan four times, challenging mercury pollution limits twice, ozone pollution limits once, fighting the Cross-State Air Pollution Rule and the Clean Water Rule, as well as fighting regulations on methane emissions. Pruitt stated at his Senate confirmation hearing in January 2017 that the EPA has an "obligation" to regulate carbon dioxide in accordance with a 2007 Supreme Court case and 2009 EPA decision establishing carbon emissions as a threat to public health.

Under Pruitt, Oklahoma sued the EPA and lost on challenges to the EPA's regulatory authority over mercury and other toxins, as well as pollutants responsible for creating regional atmospheric haze. It challenged the manner in which EPA sued unrelated entities and for what Pruitt termed the agency's "sue and settle" practices. Oklahoma further sued and lost after the EPA declined to provide extensive records in a FOIA lawsuit, a request the federal judge hearing the case found to be overly broad and economically burdensome.

=== Rulemaking ===
On March 28, 2017, President Trump signed an executive order directing Pruitt to rescind the Clean Power Plan. Pruitt has refused to rescind EPA's endangerment finding which determined that carbon dioxide emissions threaten public health, prompting criticism from some Trump supporters. Pruitt has stated that a move to rescind would almost certainly be overturned by the courts. On October 10, 2017, Pruitt issued a notice of proposed rulemaking to repeal the Clean Power Plan.

On June 27, 2017, Pruitt released a proposal to rescind the Clean Water Rule. On January 31, 2018, Pruitt finalized repeal of the Clean Water Rule.

On March 1, 2018, Pruitt issued a proposed rule to relax regulation of coal ash. Pruitt has finalized a rule postponing new effluent guidelines on power plants. Pruitt has rejected a proposed rule to require hard rock miners to guarantee they can pay mine reclamation costs. Pruitt has agreed to allow permitting to proceed for the Pebble Mine on Bristol Bay.

In June 2017, Pruitt announced that he would delay designating which areas met new National Ambient Air Quality Standards for ozone. In August 2017, Pruitt said he would reverse that decision after being sued by 16 state Attorneys General. In March 2018, Pruitt was finally ordered to do so by U.S. District Judge Haywood Stirling Gilliam Jr.

In August 2017, Pruitt began reconsidering new car emissions standards. Pruitt has been planning to reduce federally mandated corporate average fuel economy. Pruitt has proposed to repeal heightened emissions standards on "glider trucks", which are semi-trailer trucks that have new bodies but old engines. Pruitt had requested public comment on reductions to the Renewable Fuel Standard after being encouraged to do so by Carl Icahn. Pruitt has since traveled to Iowa twice to promote the repeal of the Clean Water Rule and to promise support of corn ethanol production.

Pruitt has indefinitely postponed regulations of methylene chloride, N-methylpyrrolidone, and trichloroethylene that had been called for by the Frank R. Lautenberg Chemical Safety for the 21st Century Act.

According to the EPA, lead poisoning is the number one environmental health threat in the U.S. for children ages 6 and younger. No new standards have been set since 2001, though it is agreed that the old standards need to be updated. In December 2017, after Pruitt requested six more years to regulate lead levels, a divided federal appeals court issued a writ of mandamus ordering Pruitt to regulate lead within the next 90 days. The Court called the lead paint risks for children "severe".

==== Chlorpyrifos ban ====
Chlorpyrifos is a pesticide that is used to kill a number of pests on crops, animals, and in buildings. In a 2016 report, EPA scientists were not able to find any level of exposure to chlorpyrifos that was safe. The EPA 2016 report states in part "...this assessment indicates that dietary risks from food alone are of concern ..." The report also states that previous published risk assessments for "chlorpyrifos may not provide a [sufficient] ... human health risk assessment given the potential for neurodevelopmental outcomes."

On March 29, 2017, Pruitt denied an administrative petition by the Natural Resources Defense Council and the Pesticide Action Network North America to ban chlorpyrifos, explaining "we are returning to using sound science in decision-making – rather than predetermined results". On April 5, 2017, Earthjustice sued the EPA, again demanding that the pesticide be banned.

The American Academy of Pediatrics responded to the administration's decision, saying they were "deeply alarmed" by Pruitt's decision to allow the pesticide's continued use.

Asked in April whether he had met with Dow Chemical Company (who manufactures chlorpyrifos) executives or lobbyists before his decision, an EPA spokesman replied: "We have had no meetings with Dow on this topic." In June, after several Freedom of Information Act requests, the EPA released a copy of Pruitt's March meeting schedule which showed that a meeting had been scheduled with Dow CEO Andrew Liveris at a hotel in Houston, Texas, on March 9, 2017. Internal documents show Pruitt worked closely with the American Farm Bureau Federation to permit continuation of the pesticide's use.

==== Methane rule ====
On March 22, 2017, Pruitt had dinner at the Washington Trump International Hotel with 45 board members of the American Petroleum Institute, where they asked for relief on new regulation of methane leaks from wells, which the industry estimates could cost it over $170 million. On June 13, Pruitt ordered the rule delayed for two years. On July 3, Judges David S. Tatel and Robert L. Wilkins of the United States Court of Appeals for the District of Columbia Circuit vacated that delay, finding Pruitt's order was "arbitrary" and "capricious" and in violation of the Clean Air Act, over the dissent of Judge Janice Rogers Brown. In October 2017, a federal magistrate judge ordered the administration to reimpose regulations it had repealed on methane gas flares.

=== PFOS and PFOA study publication withheld ===
January 2018 emails between the EPA, the White House, and the Department of Health and Human Services (DHHS) made public following a Freedom of Information Act request showed that the White House and EPA under Pruitt decided to halt the publication of a study done by the DHHS Agency for Toxic Substances and Disease Registry (ATSDR). The study, an assessment of the chemical pollutants PFOS and PFOA, showed that the substances present dangers to human health at far lower levels than the EPA previously deemed safe. An email from a White House official said that the administration feared a "potential public relations nightmare."

The withholding of the study prompted widespread criticism from congressional Democrats, as well as at least three congressional Republicans. These critics called upon the EPA to provide answers to questions about suppression of scientific assessments on chemical pollution of water.

Pruitt conceded that his agency should take "concrete action" related to chemicals like PFAS, but testified that he was unaware of any delay in the release of the study. At a May 2018 "leadership summit" on PFOA, PFOS and related chemicals attended by Pruitt, some reporters were barred from attending, including those from Politico (which first reported on the release of the emails), CNN, and E&E News (which writes on environmental issues). An Associated Press correspondent, Ellen Knickmeyer, was physically ejected from the meeting room, and U.S. Representative Dan Kildee of Michigan, who represents a district dealing with the Flint water crisis, said that a member of his staff was barred from the meeting. Kildee wrote to the EPA's inspector general to ask whether any open meetings laws were violated. An EPA spokesman asserted that the summit was not subject to the Federal Advisory Committee Act. Senator Tom Udall, in response, wrote a letter to Pruitt stating, "This intimidation of journalists seeking to cover a federal official presiding over important policy-making is un-American and unacceptable. ... Clean drinking water is a public health issue that does not belong behind closed doors."

== Personal life ==
Pruitt married Marlyn Lloyd in 1990 at Southeast Christian Church in Louisville, Kentucky. They have two children: daughter McKenna and son Cade.

Pruitt is Southern Baptist. According to the Oklahoma Office of Attorney General, the Pruitts are members of the First Baptist Church of Broken Arrow, where Pruitt served as a deacon. Pruitt was a trustee at the Southern Baptist Theological Seminary. He expressed his views regularly on the radio in Tulsa, including advocating for the passage of constitutional amendments to ban abortion and gay marriage and objecting to what he feels is the suppression of majority religious beliefs. In 2005, Pruitt told a radio interviewer that there are not "sufficient scientific facts to establish the theory of evolution."

== Electoral history ==
June 28, 2022, primary election results for United States Senate
Candidates	Party	Votes	%
Markwayne Mullin	Republican Party	156,087	43.62%
T. W. Shannon	Republican Party	56,056	17.53%
Nathan Dahm	Republican Party	42,673	11.92%
Luke Holland	Republican Party	40,353	11.28%
Scott Pruitt	Republican Party	18,052	5.04%
Randy Grellner	Republican Party	15,794	4.41%
Laura Moreno	Republican Party	6,597	1.84%
Jessica Jean Garrison	Republican Party	6,114	1.71%
Alex Gray (withdrew)	Republican Party	3,063	0.86%
John F. Tompkins	Republican Party	2,332	0.65%
Adam Holley	Republican Party	1,873	0.52%
Michael Coibion	Republican Party	1,261	0.35%
Paul Royse	Republican Party	900	0.25%

November 4, 2014, general election results for Attorney General

Candidates	Party	Votes	%
Scott Pruitt	Republican Party	n/a	100.00%

November 2, 2010, general election results for Attorney General

Candidates	Party	Votes	%
Scott Pruitt	Republican Party	666,407	65.11%
Jim Priest	Democratic Party	357,162	34.89%

July 27, 2010, Republican primary election results for Attorney General

Candidates	Party	Votes	%
Scott Pruitt	Republican Party	134,335	56.05%
Ryan Leonard	Republican Party	105,343	43.95%

August 22, 2006 Republican primary election results for Lt. Governor
Candidates	Party	Votes	%
Todd Hiett	Republican Party	66,220	50.92%
Scott Pruitt	Republican Party	63,817	49.08%

July 25, 2006 Republican primary election results for Lt. Governor
Candidates	Party	Votes	%
Todd Hiett	Republican Party	76,634	42.82%
Scott Pruitt	Republican Party	60,367	33.73%
Nancy Riley	Republican Party	41,984	23.46%

November 5, 2002, general election results for Oklahoma Senate, District 54

Candidates	Party	Votes	%
Scott Pruitt	Republican Party	n/a	100.00%

December 11, 2001, special election results for United States House of Representatives, District 1
Candidates	Party	Votes	%
John Sullivan	Republican Party	19,018	45.53%
Cathy Keating	Republican Party	12,736	30.49%
Scott Pruitt	Republican Party	9,513	22.77%
George E. Banasky	Republican Party	296	0.71%
Evelyn R. Rogers	Republican Party	210	0.50%

November 3, 1998, general election results for Oklahoma Senate, District 54

Candidates	Party	Votes	%
Scott Pruitt	Republican Party	9,971	63.51%
Shannon Clark	Democratic Party	5,728	36.49%

September 5, 1998, Republican runoff election results for Oklahoma Senate, District 54
Candidates	Party	Votes	%
Scott Pruitt	Republican Party	2,326	56.33%
Gerald Wright	Republican Party	1,803	43.67%

August 25, 1998, Republican primary election results for Oklahoma Senate, District 54
Candidates	Party	Votes	%
Scott Pruitt	Republican Party	1,959	48.94%
Gerald Wright	Republican Party	1,820	45.47%
Douglas E. Meehan	Republican Party	224	5.59%

Oklahoma Senate
Preceded by Gerald Wright	Member of the Oklahoma Senate from the 54th district 1999–2003	Constituency abolished
Preceded by Redistricted	Member of the Oklahoma Senate from the 36th district 2003–2007	Succeeded by Bill Brown
Party political offices
Preceded by James Dunn	Republican nominee for Attorney General of Oklahoma; 2010, 2014	Succeeded by Michael J. Hunter
Legal offices
Preceded by Drew Edmondson	Attorney General of Oklahoma; 2011–2017	Succeeded by Cara Rodriguez; Acting
Political offices
Preceded by Gina McCarthy	Administrator of the Environmental Protection Agency; 2017–2018	Succeeded by Andrew Wheeler
