= Catherine McCabe =

American lawyer

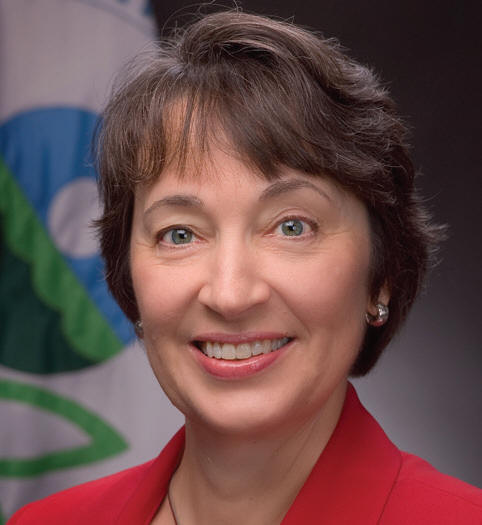

Commissioner of the New Jersey Department of Environmental Protection
- In office January 22, 2018 – January 15, 2021
- Governor: Phil Murphy
- Deputy: Deborah Mans
- Preceded by: Bob Martin
- Succeeded by: Shawn LaTourette

Administrator of the Environmental Protection Agency
- Acting
- In office January 20, 2017 – February 17, 2017
- President: Donald Trump
- Deputy: Mike Flynn (acting)
- Preceded by: Gina McCarthy
- Succeeded by: Scott Pruitt

Personal details
- Party: Democratic
- Education: Barnard College(BA), Columbia University (JD)

Catherine McCabe is a retired public administrator and environmental lawyer who served as acting administrator of the Environmental Protection Agency from January to February 2017 and commissioner of the New Jersey Department of Environmental Protection from January 2018 to January 2021.

== Education ==
McCabe graduated from Albany High School in Albany, New York in 1969. She attended Barnard College and earned a Bachelor of Arts in environmental sciences. She also studied toward a master's degree in environmental science at the Columbia University Graduate School of Arts and Sciences and earned her J.D. from Columbia Law School in 1977.

== Career ==
McCabe worked as an assistant attorney general in the Office of the Attorney General of the State of New York. She was also an associate at the New York City law firm of Webster & Sheffield.

=== Department of Justice ===
McCabe spent 22 years working in the Department of Justice, specializing in environmental issues. In 2001, she became deputy chief of the Environmental Enforcement Section of the Department of Justice.

=== Environmental Protection Agency ===
In 2005, she moved to the Environmental Protection Agency (EPA), where she was the principal deputy assistant administrator of the Office of Enforcement and Compliance Assurance. After seven years with the EPA, McCabe became one of three judges on the EPA's Environmental Appeals Board, where she served until 2014. McCabe then served as deputy regional administrator of EPA's Region 2, covering New York, New Jersey, Puerto Rico, and the U.S. Virgin Islands. McCabe also served as acting assistant administrator of EPA's Office of Enforcement and Compliance Assurance (OECA) from January to May 2009 and acting regional administrator of EPA's Region 2 from February to October 2017.

She was selected by the outgoing Obama administration to serve as acting EPA administrator starting on January 20, 2017, until President Donald Trump's EPA nominee, Scott Pruitt, was confirmed in February 2017. Following his confirmation, she returned to Region 2 to serve as acting regional administrator.

As acting EPA administrator, McCabe commented that the Trump administration's hiring freeze was creating challenges for the agency's work. Nevertheless, McCabe stated that agency staff would "continue to do our best to ensure that this agency’s decisions and actions are based on our two bedrock principles: carrying out the law and ensuring that the best science informs all that we do.”

=== New Jersey Department of Environmental Protection ===
In December 2017, New Jersey governor-elect Phil Murphy announced he would nominate McCabe to serve as commissioner of the New Jersey Department of Environmental Protection (NJDEP). Environmental groups New Jersey Sierra Club and Clean Water Action supported McCabe's nomination, which was approved on June 7, 2018.

During her time in office, NJDEP filed 13 major natural resource damages lawsuits against polluters, became a national leader in addressing contamination from per- and poly-fluoroalkyl substances (PFAS), helped to address the Newark lead water crisis, coordinated passage of a landmark environmental justice law, spearheaded New Jersey's return to the Regional Greenhouse Gas Initiative (RGGI), released the state's first comprehensive scientific report on expected local impacts of climate change, and put forward a roadmap of recommendations for cutting greenhouse gas emissions. McCabe also led NJDEP's efforts to establish an offshore wind strategic plan to generate 3,500 megawatts of offshore wind energy by 2030. On August 30, 2018, McCabe signed an administrative order that closed "all lands owned, managed or otherwise controlled" by the New Jersey Department of Environmental Protection to black bear hunting. The black bear hunting moratorium was part of then candidate for Governor Phil Murphy's campaign.

In December 2020, McCabe announced her retirement, effective January 2021.

== Personal life ==
McCabe is married with three children. She and her husband have a home in Ocean City, New Jersey, which was hit by Hurricane Sandy in 2012.

Political offices
Preceded by Gina McCarthy	Administrator of the Environmental Protection Agency; Acting; 2017	Succeeded by Scott Pruitt
