= William K. Reilly =

American conservationist (born 1940)

William Reilly
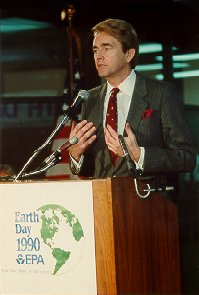

Chair of the National Commission on the BP Deepwater Horizon Oil Spill and Offshore Drilling
- In office May 21, 2010 – January 11, 2011; Served with Bob Graham
- President: Barack Obama
- Preceded by: Position established
- Succeeded by: Position abolished

7th Administrator of the Environmental Protection Agency
- In office February 8, 1989 – January 20, 1993
- President: George H. W. Bush
- Preceded by: John Moore (acting)
- Succeeded by: W. Michael McCabe (acting)

Personal details
- Born: William Kane Reilly; January 26, 1940 (age 86) Decatur, Illinois, U.S.
- Party: Republican (until 2020); Independent (2020–present)
- Spouse: Elizabeth Buxton
- Children: 2
- Education: Yale University (BA); Harvard University (LLB); Columbia University (MUP)

William Kane Reilly (born January 26, 1940) is an American conservationist. He has previously served as the Administrator of the Environmental Protection Agency under President George H. W. Bush. He has served as president of World Wildlife Fund, as a founder or advisor to several business ventures, and on many boards of directors. In 2010, he was appointed by President Barack Obama co-chair of the National Commission on the BP Deepwater Horizon Oil Spill and Offshore Drilling to investigate the oil spill in the Gulf of Mexico.

== Early life, military service and education ==
Born on January 26, 1940, in Decatur, Illinois, into a conservative, deeply religious family, Reilly was strongly influenced by his father, a highway construction steel merchant. Reilly's father moved his family from Illinois to South Texas when Reilly was 10. From the Rio Grande Valley, the Reillys moved to Fall River, Massachusetts, where he finished high school at Durfee High School.

He subsequently attended Yale University, where he earned an A.B. in history. During his Yale years, Reilly took advantage of the junior year abroad program to study in France. Reilly then earned a LL.B. from Harvard Law School, completing a thesis on land reform in Chile.

After law school, Reilly entered the United States Army and served a tour of duty during 1966 and 1967 as a captain in Europe with an intelligence unit planning for the evacuation of U.S. troops from France. After completing military service, Reilly returned to school and received a master's degree in urban planning at Columbia University.

== Early career ==
In 1968, fresh from planning school and a four-month project in Turkey, Reilly went to work for Urban America, Inc., where he worked to integrate century-old concerns for urban beautification, an issue which had been brought to the forefront of the American conscience by the civil rights movement - concerns which would grow into the environmental justice movement which he dealt with when he was at the EPA.

In 1970, during the Nixon Administration, Reilly became a senior staff member of the President's Council on Environmental Quality (CEQ) under Russell Train, who would later become the second EPA Administrator in 1972.

Reilly moved from CEQ to become President of The Conservation Foundation, which merged with World Wildlife Fund (WWF) in 1985. After the merger, he served as President of World Wildlife Fund until taking over as administrator at the EPA in 1989.

== EPA Administrator ==
During his time at Environmental Protection Agency (EPA), Reilly championed integration of the nation's environmental and economic agendas and sought to strengthen the role of science at EPA. He put priority on elevating attention to the protection and restoration of natural systems, preventing pollution before it is generated, enforcing environmental laws aggressively, and fostering such innovative cleanup technologies as bioremediation. He also led the Agency in assessing and advancing the concerns of the emerging environmental justice movement.

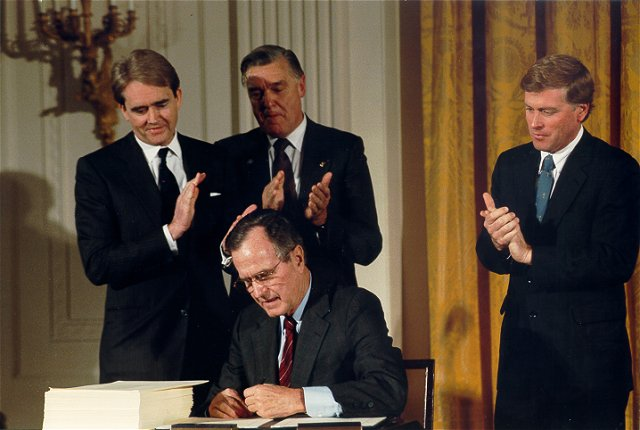
William Reilly watches as President George H.W. Bush signs the Clean Air Act Amendments of 1990

Reilly played a pivotal role in crafting and securing passage of a new Clean Air bill, enacted by Congress and signed into law by President Bush in November 1990. Breaking a 10-year stalemate in reauthorizing the Clean Air Act, this law created the first full-scale, fully operational cap-and-trade system as an innovative, market-oriented mechanism to cut sulfur dioxide pollution in half at a time when acid rain was a major environmental problem. The 1990 amendments to the Act also addressed ozone depletion, established a national permits program for stationary emitting sources, promoted the use of alternative fuels, required major reductions in air toxic emissions, and laid out realistic timetables and commitments to assure steady progress in reducing ozone in cities that have not yet attained air quality standards while increasing EPA's enforcement authority.

While at EPA, Reilly elevated attention to restoring the health of natural systems, including the Chesapeake Bay, the Great Lakes, the Gulf of Mexico, and other water bodies. Federal funding for targeted, high-priority geographic areas jumped from $40 million to over $700 million. He also sought to give impetus to the President's policy of "no net loss" of wetlands. During his tenure, EPA vetoed three water resource projects for adverse environmental impacts, including the proposed Two Forks dam in Colorado, a decision which prompted fundamental changes in water policy in the West.

Reilly made pollution prevention a priority, negotiating voluntary agreements with industry to reduce toxic emissions and promote energy conservation, and encouraging recycling and waste reduction. Under his direction, the Agency achieved record levels in criminal and civil enforcement actions, and collected more in fines and penalties in his four years than in the Agency's previous 18-year history. EPA secured over $1 billion annually in private party contributions to Superfund cleanups, a three-fold increase over 1988; over four years, the amount collected accounted for three quarters of all such contributions since the Superfund program began. During Reilly's final year at EPA the Agency completed cleanup at a Superfund site every five days.

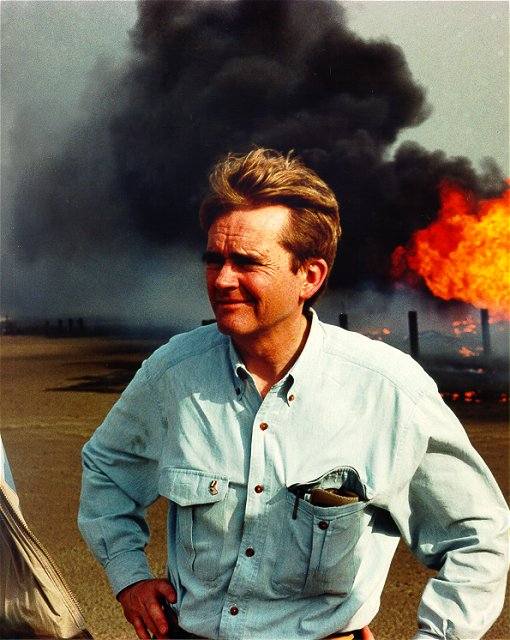
Reilly in Kuwait to assesses environmental damage of the 1991 oil fires

Reilly also played a leading role in asserting environmental priorities in U.S. foreign policy. He headed the U.S. delegation to the Earth Summit in Rio de Janeiro in June 1992. At his direction, EPA did some of the seminal research on greenhouse gas reductions, which helped pave the way for a treaty on climate change, calling for national action plans, periodic scientific and economic reassessments, and assistance to developing countries. He was also prominent in advancing forest conservation on an international scale, culminating in a declaration of principles at the Rio Summit.

In 1990, Reilly represented President Bush at the opening of the Eastern and Central European Regional Environment Center proposed by the President during his 1989 visit to Budapest (EPA was instrumental in setting up the Center and developing its program); negotiated on behalf of the United States, first in London in 1990, later in Copenhagen in 1992, revisions to the Montreal Protocol phasing out CFCs and other ozone-depleting chemicals; and worked with the Secretary of State and other Cabinet officials on a range of bilateral and multilateral issues involving Brazil, Canada, Hungary, Israel, Mexico, Poland, Russia, Turkey, the so-called G-7 industrialized democracies, and other member countries of the Organization for Economic Cooperation and Development (OECD).

Reilly accompanied President Bush to the 1989 Paris Economic Summit, the first environment minister to accompany a head of state to this annual meeting. At President Bush's request he led a mission to Kuwait at the conclusion of the war to assess the environmental and health effects of the burning oil fields, and then reported to the Congress on his findings. He also became the first EPA Administrator to take part in the annual bi-national Cabinet meetings with Mexico, and played a pivotal role in assuring that the North American Free Trade Agreement (NAFTA) factored in environmental concerns. Reilly testified before Congress in support of NAFTA seven times.

== Later career ==
After leaving EPA in January 1993, Reilly returned to World Wildlife Fund. Later that year, he and his wife moved to the Bay area in California when Reilly accepted the position of Payne Visiting Professor at the Institute for International Studies at Stanford University.

Reilly is founding partner of Aqua International Partners, L.P., a private equity fund dedicated to investing in companies in the water sector in developing countries. AIP was formed in 1997 and is based in San Francisco.

Reilly is a director of ConocoPhillips, Royal Caribbean International, and the Packard Foundation. He also serves as chairman of the board of World Wildlife Fund, co-chair of the Energy Project formed by the Bipartisan Policy Center, and chair of the Advisory Board for the Nicholas Institute for Environmental Policy Solutions at Duke University. He previously served as a director of DuPont and the National Geographic Society. He is also a member of Washington D.C.–based Western Hemisphere think tank, the Inter-American Dialogue.

Reilly is an advisor to TPG Capital, an international investment firm. He was a key player in the leveraged buyout by TPG and Kohlberg Kravis Roberts & Co (KKR) of Texas Utilities (TXU, now Energy Future Holdings Corporation) in February 2007, instrumental in negotiating with TXU a reduction in the number of coal-fired power plants to be constructed from 11 to 3. He serves as chairman of the Sustainable Energy Advisory Board for the company.

In 2012, President Obama appointed Reilly to the newly formed Global Development Council, the mission of which is to advise the president on future directions for U.S. foreign assistance.

In 2013, the Center for Environmental Policy at American University established the William K. Reilly Fund for Environmental Governance and Leadership to honor Reilly as "one of the most respected environmental leaders in the nation".

Despite his history as a Republican, Reilly endorsed Hillary Clinton for President in 2016.

In 2020, Reilly endorsed Joe Biden for President, and stated he no longer considered himself a Republican. Reilly told The New York Times, "This is not a party of principle at the national level so I left it. I am now an independent. It's a very discouraging time for someone who was part of the party for so long."

=== Commission on BP oil spill ===
In May 2010, Reilly was appointed co-chair of the body formed to study the British Petroleum Deepwater Horizon oil spill and related issues of offshore drilling, with former Florida governor and U.S. senator Bob Graham, a Democrat, as the other co-chair. President Obama met with the co-chairs for the first time June 1. At that time, the president was quoted as saying of the co-chairs: "They have my full support to follow the facts wherever they lead, without fear or favor." Appearing on the Diane Rehm Show the same day, congressman Ed Markey (D-MA) responded to the suggestion that an oil industry representative be appointed to the commission by pointing to Republican Reilly's position with Conoco. The suggestion had been forwarded by John Breaux, former Democratic U.S. senator from Louisiana and lobbyist more recently for among others Shell Oil Company. Markey also opined that Congress ought to give subpoena power to the commission.

In October 2011, Reilly appeared with Graham at Climate One to discuss problems with industry practices, domestic and international regulatory oversight including coordination with Mexican and Cuban deep-water drilling industries, and recommendations on what will power the U.S. economy while it transitions to cleaner energy. The Commonwealth Club of California in San Francisco, which had hosted the Climate One event, broadcast the discussion on public radio nationally in early December.

== Awards ==
In November, 2011, Reilly received the Vincent Scully Prize at the National Building Museum for "his commitment to smart environmental planning, comprehensive land use and preservation of open space".

== Personal life ==
Reilly is married to Elizabeth Bennett Buxton. They have two daughters, Katherine Buxton Reilly and Margaret Mahalah Reilly.

Political offices
Preceded by Lee Thomas	Administrator of the Environmental Protection Agency; 1989–1993	Succeeded by Carol Browner
Government offices
New office	Chair of the National Commission on the BP Deepwater Horizon Oil Spill and Offshore Drilling; 2010–2011; Served alongside: Bob Graham	Position abolished
