= Lee M. Thomas =

American government official

Lee Thomas
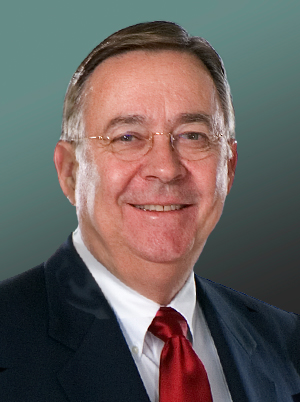

6th Administrator of the Environmental Protection Agency
- In office January 4, 1985 – January 20, 1989; Acting: January 4, 1985 – February 8, 1985
- President: Ronald Reagan
- Preceded by: William Ruckelshaus
- Succeeded by: John Moore (acting)

Personal details
- Born: Lee Muller Thomas; June 13, 1944 (age 82) Ridgeway, South Carolina, U.S.
- Party: Republican
- Spouse: Dorothy Thomas
- Children: 4
- Education: University of the South (BA); University of South Carolina, Columbia (MEd)

Lee Muller Thomas (born June 13, 1944) is an American government official who was Administrator of the United States Environmental Protection Agency from 1985 to 1989 under President Ronald Reagan.

== Biography ==
Thomas attended Virginia Episcopal School and earned his Masters in Education from the University of South Carolina, where he did postgraduate work in psychology. He received his Bachelor of Arts degree in psychology from the University of the South in Sewanee, Tennessee.

He went on to become president and chief operating officer of Georgia-Pacific Corporation in 2005.

He was appointed president and chief executive officer of Rayonier, Inc. on March 1, 2007, and became chairman on July 1, 2007.

He succeeded William Ruckelshaus. He is a Republican.

Thomas led the EPA when the report Unfinished Business: A Comparative Assessment of Environmental Problems was released.

In 2008, Thomas served as a member of the board of directors for the following entities: Airgas, Inc., the Regal Entertainment Group, the Federal Reserve Bank of Atlanta, the World Resources Institute, the American Forest and Paper Association, and DuPont.

Since 2015, he has served on the Board of Advisors for Angeleno Group, a private equity and venture capital firm focused on sustainable energy investments.

Political offices
Preceded by William Ruckelshaus	Administrator of the Environmental Protection Agency; 1985–1989	Succeeded by William Reilly
