= Mike Shapiro (government official) =

American government official

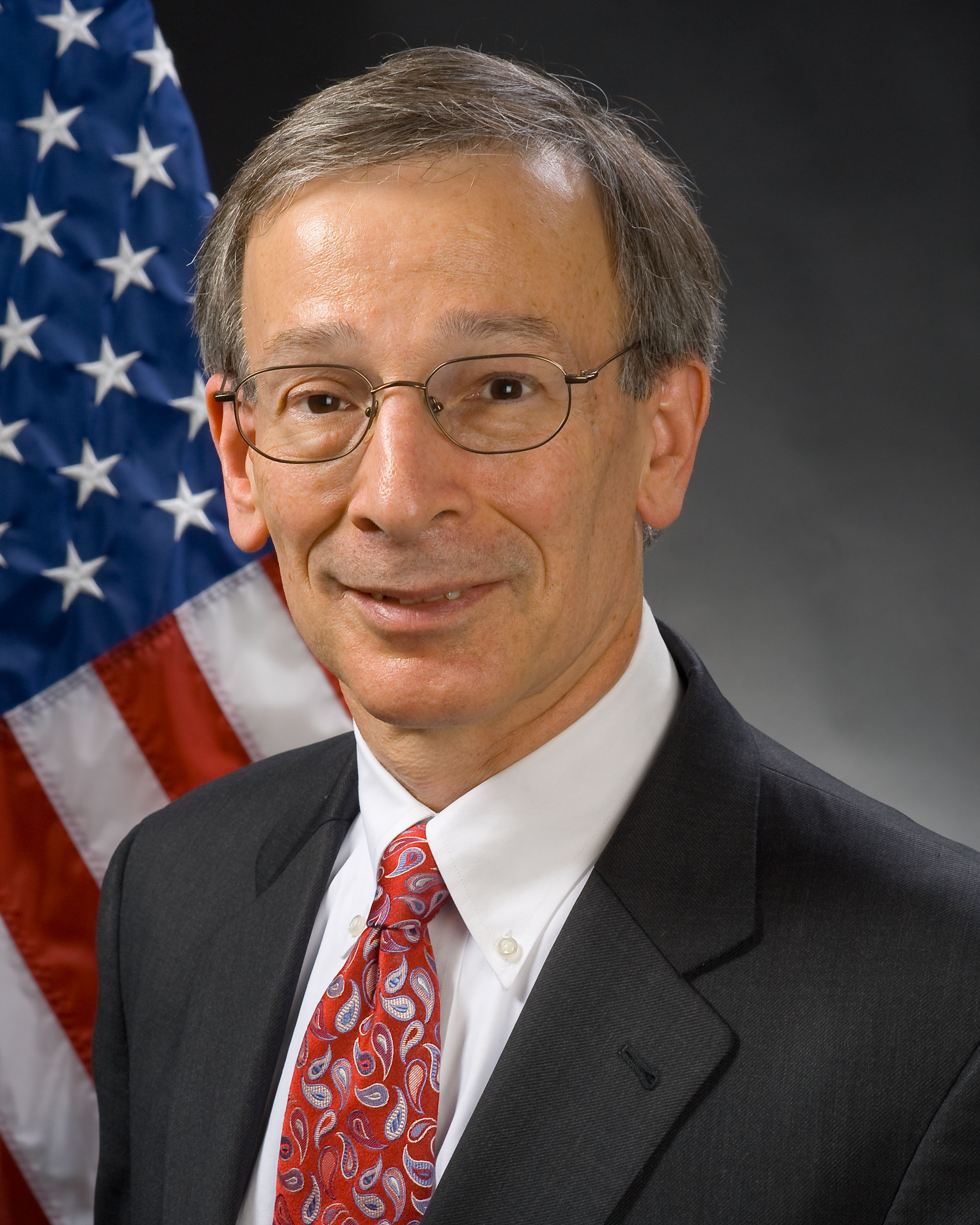
- Shapiro in 2009

Administrator of the Environmental Protection Agency
- Acting
- In office January 21, 2009 – January 23, 2009
- President: Barack Obama
- Preceded by: Granta Nakayama (acting)
- Succeeded by: Lisa P. Jackson

Personal details
- Party: Independent
- Education: Lehigh University; Harvard University
- Occupation: Government official

Mike Shapiro is an American government official. An independent, he served as acting administrator of the Environmental Protection Agency from January 21, 2009 to January 23, 2009.
