= Administrator of the Environmental Protection Agency =

Head of the US Environmental Protection Agency

- Seal of the Environmental Protection Agency

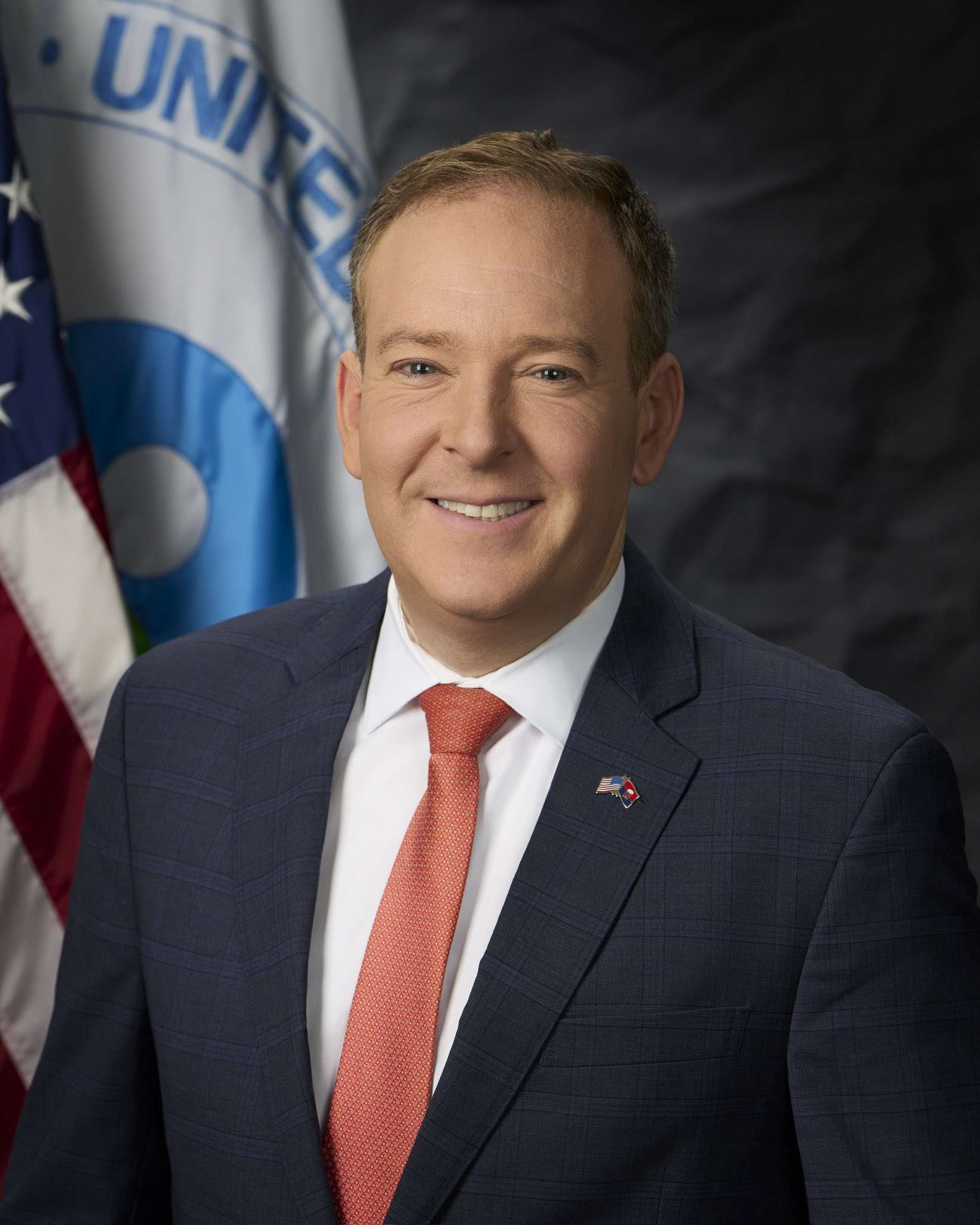
- Incumbent; Lee Zeldin since January 29, 2025
- U.S. Environmental Protection Agency
- Style: Mr Administrator
- Member of: Cabinet
- Reports to: President of the United States
- Seat: William Jefferson Clinton Federal Building
- Appointer: The president; with Senate advice and consent
- Term length: No fixed term
- Inaugural holder: William D. Ruckelshaus
- Formation: 1970
- Deputy: Deputy Administrator
- Salary: Executive Schedule, Level II
- Website: www.epa.gov

The administrator of the Environmental Protection Agency is the head of the United States Environmental Protection Agency (EPA), and is thus responsible for enforcing the nation's Clean Air and Clean Water Acts, as well as numerous other environmental statutes. The administrator is nominated by the president of the United States and must be confirmed by a vote of the Senate.

Lee Zeldin is the current administrator of the EPA.

== Rank in the Cabinet ==
Since the Clinton administration, the EPA administrator has been accorded cabinet rank by the president. The administrator of the EPA is equivalent to the position of minister of the environment in other countries. There have been various proposals to make the EPA a full executive department.

== List of administrators ==
The following persons served as Administrator of the Environmental Protection Agency:

Denotes Acting Administrator of the Environmental Protection Agency

No.	Officeholder	Term start	Term end	Refs.	President(s)
1	William Ruckelshaus	December 4, 1970	April 30, 1973 (Note: During the Nixon administration, Ruckelshaus left the EPA in 1973 to become the acting head of the FBI during the middle of the Watergate scandal. Ruckelshaus would later return a decade later to head the EPA during the Reagan administration.)		Richard Nixon (1969–1974)
–	Robert W. Fri; Acting	April 30, 1973	September 12, 1973		Richard Nixon (1969–1974)
2	Russell E. Train	September 12, 1973	January 20, 1977		Richard Nixon (1969–1974)
2	Russell E. Train	September 12, 1973	January 20, 1977		Gerald Ford (1974–1977)
–	John Quarles Jr. Acting	January 21, 1977	March 6, 1977		Jimmy Carter (1977–1981)
3	Douglas M. Costle	March 7, 1977	January 20, 1981		Jimmy Carter (1977–1981)
–	Steven Jellinek; Acting	January 21, 1981	January 25, 1981		Ronald Reagan (1981–1989)
–	Walter Barber Jr. Acting	January 25, 1981	May 19, 1981		Ronald Reagan (1981–1989)
4	Anne Gorsuch Burford	May 20, 1981	March 9, 1983		Ronald Reagan (1981–1989)
–	Lee Verstandig; Acting	March 10, 1983	May 17, 1983		Ronald Reagan (1981–1989)
5	William Ruckelshaus	May 18, 1983	January 4, 1985		Ronald Reagan (1981–1989)
6	Lee M. Thomas	January 4, 1985	February 8, 1985		Ronald Reagan (1981–1989)
6	Lee M. Thomas	February 8, 1985	January 20, 1989		Ronald Reagan (1981–1989)
–	John Moore; Acting	January 20, 1989	February 6, 1989		George H. W. Bush (1989–1993)
7	William K. Reilly	February 6, 1989	January 20, 1993		George H. W. Bush (1989–1993)
–	W. Michael McCabe; Acting	January 20, 1993	January 31, 1993		Bill Clinton (1993–2001)
8	Carol Browner	January 31, 1993	January 20, 2001		Bill Clinton (1993–2001)
–	W. Michael McCabe; Acting	January 20, 2001	January 31, 2001		George W. Bush (2001–2009)
9	Christine Todd Whitman	January 31, 2001	June 27, 2003		George W. Bush (2001–2009)
–	Linda Fisher; Acting	June 27, 2003	July 11, 2003		George W. Bush (2001–2009)
–	Stephen L. Johnson; Acting	July 11, 2003	July 14, 2003		George W. Bush (2001–2009)
–	Marianne Lamont Horinko; Acting	July 14, 2003	November 6, 2003		George W. Bush (2001–2009)
10	Mike Leavitt	November 6, 2003	January 26, 2005		George W. Bush (2001–2009)
11	Stephen L. Johnson	January 26, 2005	May 2, 2005		George W. Bush (2001–2009)
11	Stephen L. Johnson	May 2, 2005	January 20, 2009		George W. Bush (2001–2009)
–	Granta Nakayama; Acting	January 20, 2009	January 21, 2009		Barack Obama (2009–2017)
–	Mike Shapiro; Acting	January 21, 2009	January 23, 2009		Barack Obama (2009–2017)
12	Lisa P. Jackson	January 23, 2009	February 15, 2013		Barack Obama (2009–2017)
–	Bob Perciasepe; Acting	February 15, 2013	July 18, 2013		Barack Obama (2009–2017)
13	Gina McCarthy	July 19, 2013	January 20, 2017		Barack Obama (2009–2017)
–	Catherine McCabe; Acting	January 20, 2017	February 17, 2017		Donald Trump (2017–2021)
14	Scott Pruitt	February 17, 2017	July 9, 2018		Donald Trump (2017–2021)
15	Andrew R. Wheeler	July 9, 2018	February 28, 2019		Donald Trump (2017–2021)
15	Andrew R. Wheeler	February 28, 2019	January 20, 2021		Donald Trump (2017–2021)
–	Charlotte Bertrand; Acting	January 20, 2021	January 20, 2021		Joe Biden (2021–2025)
–	Jane Nishida; Acting	January 20, 2021	March 11, 2021		Joe Biden (2021–2025)
16	Michael S. Regan	March 11, 2021	December 31, 2024		Joe Biden (2021–2025)
–	Jane Nishida; Acting	January 1, 2025	January 20, 2025		Joe Biden (2021–2025)
–	Kimberly Patrick; Acting	January 20, 2025	January 20, 2025		Donald Trump (2025–present)
–	James Payne; Acting	January 20, 2025	January 29, 2025		Donald Trump (2025–present)
17	Lee Zeldin	January 29, 2025	present		Donald Trump (2025–present)

Table notes:

== List of deputy administrators ==
The following persons served as deputy administrator:

No.	Officeholder	Term start	Term end	Refs.
1	Robert W. Fri	June 14, 1971	April 29, 1973	
acting	John R. Quarles Jr.	April 29, 1973	October 18, 1973	
2	John R. Quarles Jr.	October 19, 1973	January 20, 1977	
3	Barbara Blum	March 7, 1977	January 20, 1981	
4	John W. Hernandez Jr.	May 20, 1981	March 25, 1983	
5	Alvin L. Alm	August 5, 1983	May 9, 1985	
6	A. James Barnes	May 10, 1985	August 14, 1988	
acting	John A. Moore	August 15, 1988	January 20, 1989	
Vacant		January 20, 1989	February 4, 1989	
acting	John A. Moore	February 5, 1989	May 18, 1989	
7	F. Henry Habicht II	May 19, 1989	January 20, 1993	
acting	Richard Morgenstern	January 21, 1993	March 7, 1993	
acting	Jonathan Z. Cannon	March 8, 1993	May 9, 1993	
8	Robert M. Sussman	May 10, 1993	October 17, 1994	
9	Fred Hansen	October 18, 1994	September 30, 1998	
acting	Peter D. Robertson	October 1, 1998	December 7, 1999	
acting	W. Michael McCabe	December 8, 1999	August 6, 2000	
10	W. Michael McCabe	August 6, 2000	January 20, 2001	
Vacant		January 20, 2001	May 31, 2001	
11	Linda Fisher	May 31, 2001	June 27, 2003	
Vacant		June 28, 2003	July 11, 2003	
acting	Stephen L. Johnson	July 11, 2003	August 1, 2004	
12	Stephen L. Johnson	August 1, 2004	January 26, 2005	
Vacant		January 26, 2005	August 8, 2005	
13	Marcus Peacock	August 8, 2005	January 20, 2009	
Vacant		January 20, 2009	February 4, 2009	
acting	Scott Fulton	February 4, 2009	December 24, 2009	
14	Bob Perciasepe	December 24, 2009	August 7, 2014	
acting	Lisa Feldt	August 8, 2014	October 7, 2014	
acting	Stan Meiburg	October 7, 2014	January 20, 2017	
acting	Mike Flynn	January 20, 2017	April 3, 2018	
15	Andrew R. Wheeler	April 12, 2018	July 9, 2019	
acting	Henry Darwin	July 9, 2019	January 20, 2021	
Vacant		January 20, 2021	April 28, 2021	
16	Janet McCabe	April 29, 2021	October 4, 2024	
acting	Jane Nishida	October 5, 2024	December 31, 2024	
acting	Dan Utech	January 1, 2025	January 20, 2025	
acting	Gregg Treml	January 20, 2025	January 29, 2025	
acting	Chad McIntosh	January 29, 2025	June 16, 2025	
17	David Fotouhi	June 16, 2025	present	

== Acting administrators ==
Acting administrators usually assume the office in the interim period between the resignation of a previous administrator and the confirmation of his or her successor, including during the transition period between two presidential administrations, before the successor has been nominated and confirmed. Acting administrators come from within the EPA and usually hold an office that is subject to Senate confirmation before becoming the acting administrator. Linda Fisher and Stephen L. Johnson had served as Deputy Administrator when they became acting administrator. Marianne Lamont Horinko was an assistant administrator at the time. They are not subject to Senate confirmation to serve as the acting administrator, though to continue to serve as a full-fledged administrator (as in the case of Lee M. Thomas or Stephen L. Johnson), they must be confirmed by the Senate.

== Line of succession ==
The line of succession for the administrator of the Environmental Protection Agency is as follows:

1. Deputy Administrator of the Environmental Protection Agency
2. General Counsel
3. Assistant Administrator for the Office of Land and Emergency Management
4. Assistant Administrator for the Office of Chemical Safety and Pollution Prevention
5. Assistant Administrator for the Office of Air and Radiation
6. Assistant Administrator for the Office of Water
7. Assistant Administrator for the Office of Enforcement and Compliance Assurance
8. Chief Financial Officer
9. Assistant Administrator for the Office of Research and Development
10. Assistant Administrator for the Office of International and Tribal Affairs
11. Assistant Administrator for the Office of Administration and Resources Management
12. Assistant Administrator for the Office of Environmental Information
13. Regional Administrator, Region 7 (Kansas City, Kansas)
14. Principal Deputy General Counsel
15. Principal Deputy Assistant Administrator for the Office of Enforcement and Compliance Assurance
16. Deputy Regional Administrator, Region 2 (New York, New York)
17. Deputy Regional Administrator, Region 5 (Chicago, Illinois)

== See also ==
- White House Office of Energy and Climate Change Policy
- Presidential Task Force on the Auto Industry
