= Federal Aviation Act of 1958 =

U.S. Congressional act that created the FAA

- Long title: An Act to continue the Civil Aeronautics Board as an agency of the United States, to create a Federal Aviation Agency, to provide for the regulation and promotion of civil aviation in such manner as to best foster its development and safety, and to provide for the safe and efficient use of the airspace by both civil and military aircraft, and for other purposes.
- Enacted by: the 85th United States Congress
- Effective: August 23, 1958

Citations
- Public law: 85-726
- Statutes at Large: 72 Stat. 731

Codification
- Titles amended: 49 U.S.C.: Transportation
- U.S.C. sections created: 49 U.S.C. ch. 1

Legislative history
- Introduced in the Senate as S. 3880 by Warren Magnuson (D–WA) on July 9, 1958; Committee consideration by Senate Interstate and Foreign Commerce, House Interstate and Foreign Commerce; Passed the Senate on July 14, 1958 (Passed); Passed the House on August 4, 1958 (Passed); Reported by the joint conference committee on August 5, 1958; agreed to by the Senate on August 11, 1958 (Agreed) and by the House on August 13, 1958 (Agreed); Signed into law by President Dwight Eisenhower on August 23, 1958

Major amendments
- Fly America Act

The modern logo of the Federal Aviation Administration.

The Federal Aviation Act of 1958 was an act of the United States Congress, signed by President Dwight D. Eisenhower, that created the Federal Aviation Agency (later the Federal Aviation Administration or the FAA) and abolished its predecessor, the Civil Aeronautics Authority (CAA). The act empowered the FAA to oversee and regulate safety in the airline industry and the use of American airspace by both military aircraft and civilian aircraft.

== Background ==
Aviation in the United States was unregulated until the Air Commerce Act became law in 1926. The Act created an Aeronautic Branch within the United States Department of Commerce with regulatory powers over civil aviation. Among the functions the Aeronautic Branch performed were pilot testing and licensing, issuing aircraft airworthiness certificates, establishing and enforcing safety regulations. The agency was also responsible for establishing airways and operating and maintaining aids to air navigation, in addition to investigating accidents and incidents.

In 1934, the Aeronautics Branch was renamed the Bureau of Air Commerce. In 1936 the Bureau took over air traffic control centers previously operated by commercial airlines, and began to expand the air traffic control system.

In 1938, the Civil Aeronautics Act moved oversight of non-military aviation into a new, independent agency, the Civil Aeronautics Authority. The new agency gained the authority the power to regulate fares and routes for commercial airlines. Another change followed in 1940, with CAA's authority being split. The CAA continued to have authority for air traffic control, safety, and promotion of civil aviation. The new Civil Aeronautics Board (CAB) was established and had responsibility for accident investigation, as well as regulation of safety of civil aviation and pricing of commercial aviation.

A boom in the 1950s of aircraft technology and the airline industry crowded American airspace, and the regulation of air traffic was considered antiquated.

In 1956, President Dwight D. Eisenhower appointed Edward Peck Curtis as Special Assistant for Aviation. Later that year, Curtis was named by Eisenhower to head a commission to study the dramatic increase in airline traffic and to propose ways to deal with airplane traffic jams at airports.

From that commission came a proposal to create a new Federal aviation agency that would replace the Civil Aeronautics Administration and the Civil Aeronautics Board to consolidate air operations, modernize the airways and to make and enforce safety rules.

An ensuing series of plane accidents prompted the creation of the Federal Aviation Agency, later to be known as the Federal Aviation Administration.

== Mid-air collisions spur change ==
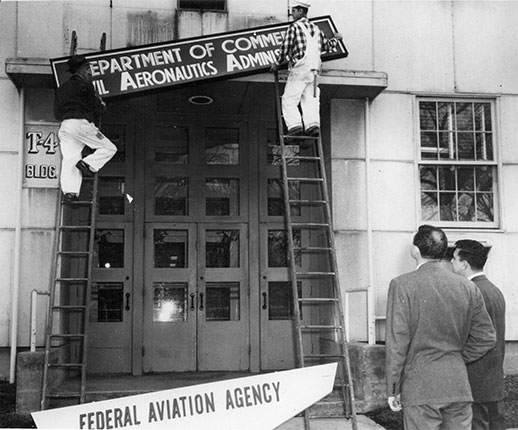
A sign change as the Civil Aeronautics Administration becomes the Federal Aviation Agency in 1958

On the morning of June 30, 1956, United Flight 718 collided with TWA Flight 2 over the Grand Canyon, resulting in 128 deaths, which was at the time the largest loss of life in an aviation accident. This high-profile accident, which took place in uncontrolled airspace, raised public concern for airline safety. In 1957 Congress passed the Airways Modernization Act that established the Airways Modernization Board (AMB) headed by General Elwood Quesada.

Two subsequent mid-air collisions between military aircraft and commercial airliners, one near Las Vegas, Nevada (United Airlines Flight 736) on April 21, 1958, where 49 died, and one involving Capital Airlines (Capital Airlines Flight 300) over Brunswick, Maryland a month later on May 20 that cost 11 lives, showed further imperfections in the regulation of air traffic, particularly the need for unified control of airspace for civil and military flights. The day after the Brunswick collision, Senator Mike Monroney and Representative Oren Harris introduced the Federal Aviation Act. Two days after the Capital Airlines mid-air, a stopgap presidential proclamation was issued that 1) required military jet aircraft to fly by Instrument Flight Rules while in the civil airways below 25,000 ft. (later reduced to 20,000 ft.); 2) prohibited jet penetration swoops from high to low altitudes through civil airways. An exception was made for emergency jet-bomber and fighter "scrambles," which would be continued whenever necessary for the national defense.

Citing "recent midair collisions of aircraft occasioning tragic losses of human life," President Eisenhower announced the White House's support of the legislation on June 13. The legislation passed Congress and was signed into law by Eisenhower on August 23, 1958. Eisenhower appointed AMB Chairman Quesada the first FAA Administrator.

The Act consolidated safety rulemaking authority, which had previously been split between the Civil Aeronautics Administration and the Civil Aeronautics Board, under the single new Federal Aviation Agency Administrator. The Civil Aeronautics Board retained authority over accident investigation and economic regulation of the airlines until those functions were later transferred to the National Transportation Safety Board and the Department of Transportation, respectively.

A Memorandum of Agreement (MOA) between the DoD and FAA on the Future of Radar Approach Controls in the National Airspace System, 14 December 1988, states that the FAA "determines the standard for NAS equipment and ATC facilities" and that the "DoD will equip facilities providing services to civil users so that the ATC service is transparent to the user."

== Codification and repeal ==
In 1994, Congress approved H.R. 1758 which recodified existing aviation legislation and the 1958 Aviation Act was repealed.

== See also ==
- Federal Aviation Regulations
- United States government role in civil aviation
