= Fly America Act =

1975 American aviation law

International Air Transportation Fair Competitive Practices Act
- Long title: An act to amend the Federal Aviation Act of 1958 to deal with discriminatory and unfair competitive practices in international air transportation, and for other purposes.
- Enacted by: the 93rd United States Congress

Citations
- Public law: Pub. L. 93–623

Codification
- Acts amended: Federal Aviation Act of 1958
- Titles amended: 49 U.S.C.: Transportation
- U.S.C. sections created: 49 U.S.C. § 40118

Legislative history
- Introduced in the Senate as S. 3481 by Howard Cannon (D-NV) on May 13, 1974; Passed the Senate on October 10, 1974 (72-2); Passed the House on December 17, 1974 (221-54, in lieu of H.R. 14266 passed December 13, 1974); Signed into law by President Gerald Ford on January 3, 1975

The Fly America Act refers to the provisions enacted by 49 U.S.C. § 40118.

The Fly America Act regulates travel funded by United States federal government, requiring the use of U.S. flag airlines (not to be confused with flag carriers) for official travel with a few exceptions. Covered individuals include federal government employees, their dependents, consultants, contractors, grantees, and others.

The Fly America Act is incorporated into the Federal Acquisition Regulations (FAR) at Subpart 47.4—Air Transportation by U.S.‑Flag Carriers and is, therefore, applicable to all U.S. government contracts issued to U.S. and non‑U.S. companies, except for commercial item contractors, which are exempt from the act under Part 12.503 of the FAR.

The Fly America Act does not prohibit travel funded by civilian government agencies on carriers associated with nations that have a qualifying "bilateral or multilateral agreement" with the United States; however, travelers must complete a declaration that such an agreement exists. Although the United States has entered into more than one hundred Open Skies agreements, only a few of them are considered qualifying "bilateral or multilateral agreement[s]"; they are the agreements with the European Union (including non‑EU members Norway and Iceland), Australia, Switzerland, and Japan.

British-owned airlines were disqualified for the Fly America Act in 2021 after the United Kingdom left the European Union.

== See also ==
- Bilateral air transport agreement
- Open skies
