= Newark water crisis =

Water contamination event in New Jersey

Newark, New Jersey water crisis
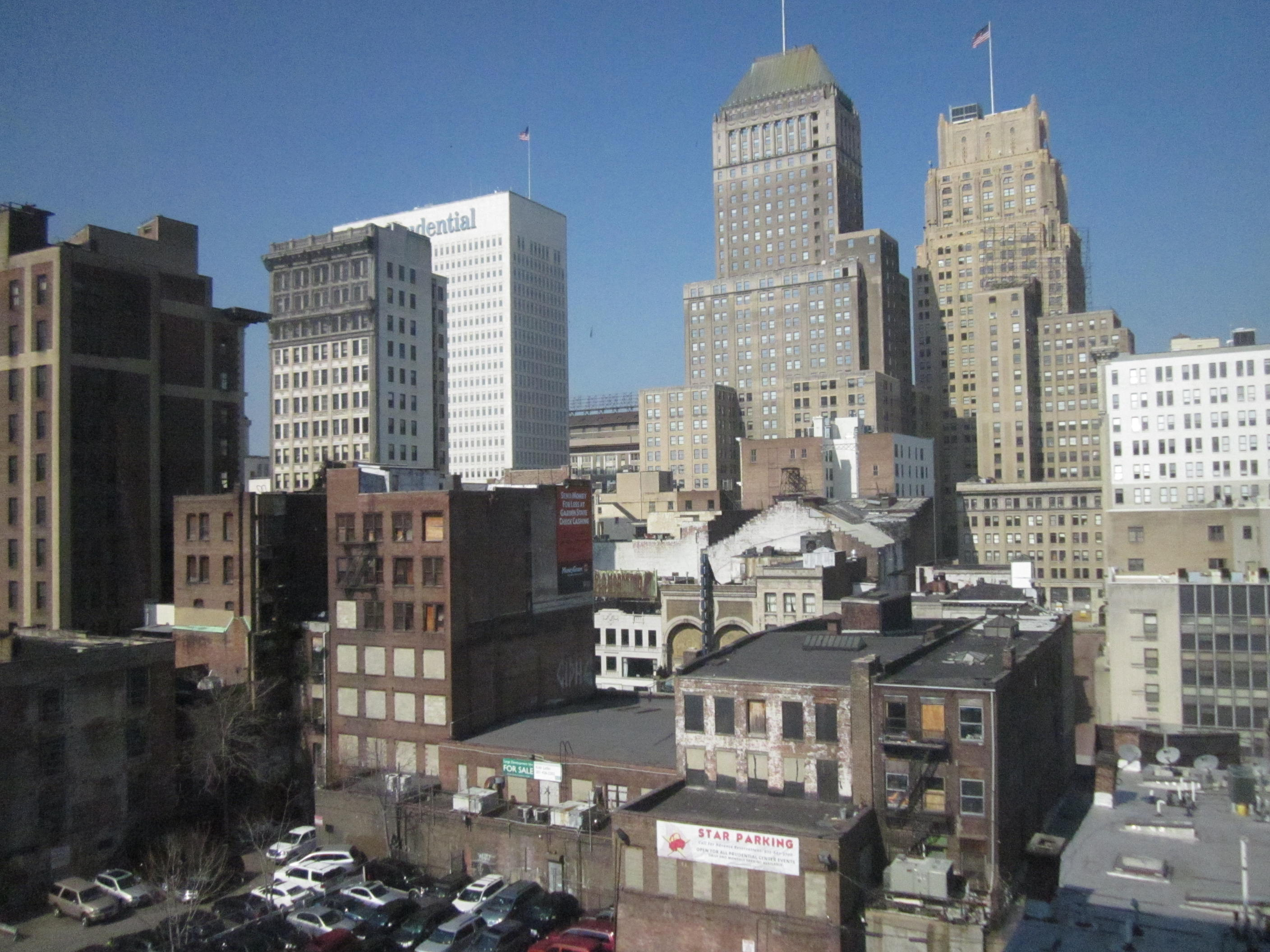
- Date: 2016 – present
- Location: Newark, New Jersey, U.S.; 40.72°N 74.17°W
- Type: Water pollution Lead contamination

The Newark, New Jersey water crisis began in 2016 when elevated lead levels were observed in multiple Newark Public Schools district schools throughout the city.

Multiple water studies were conducted by both federal agencies, such as the United States Environmental Protection Agency, and non-profit groups. The lead levels exceeded the limit of 15 parts per billion set by the Safe Drinking Water Act. As a result, the EPA ordered the City of Newark to provide bottled water and filters to affected customers. As of January 2020, more than 200,000 residents were affected by the elevated levels of lead.

In October 2024, officials announced that the company hired to replace the lead service lines at 1,500 properties lied and falsified reports while not conducting the work they were hired to do.

== Background ==
Much of the drinking water in Newark, and Northern New Jersey in general, comes from reservoirs. Drinking water then is processed through water treatment plants to the final destinations throughout the region. The water pipes that connect the main pipes to homes and businesses were lined with lead along with other chemicals. The water destroyed the lead-lined pipes, causing the lead to leak into the water supply.

The management of the city's water safety plan is under the jurisdiction of the Newark Watershed Conservation and Development Corporation (NWCDC), under the direction of a board appointed by the mayor of Newark. The New Jersey State Comptroller released a report in 2014 detailing widespread corruption throughout the agency. In early 2016, multiple agency officials were arrested and charged with stealing money and accepting bribes.

In 2019, it was reported that in 2016 city officials in Newark were informed that the chemical, sodium silicate, that they added twenty years ago to prevent corrosion and the leaching of lead from service line pipes into the water had stopped working. Based on public records, in 2015, the city had increased the acidity of the water to lower possible carcinogens in the supply. As a result, the acidity lessened the benefit of the sodium silicate. Water testing by the city showed elevated levels of lead at roughly half of the schools in Newark. City and state officials blamed poor internal plumbing and maintenance as the cause. Beginning in 2017, the State of New Jersey mandated some cities test their water twice a year for contaminants and carcinogens instead of once every three years. The first round of results from Newark showed elevated levels of lead in July 2017. Mayor Ras Baraka later stated that extensive testing had begun as required by state law but claimed the city did not know how widespread the issue was so there was no need to take further action.

In January 2018, results from a second consecutive test showed continued elevated levels of lead from Newark. Mayor Baraka continued to dismiss the warnings and had the city tell residents that the lead issue was only in older homes in the city's annual water quality mailing. Comparisons to the Flint water crisis were rejected by the Mayor and called those comparisons "absolutely and outrageously false statements" via a message on the city's website that was later deleted. In December 2018, in order to combat the negative publicity of the lead contamination, Newark hired Mercury Public Affairs, the same public relations firms that the former Governor of Michigan, Rick Snyder, hired during the water crisis in Flint, for $225,000.00. Mayor Baraka later called the allegations that he deliberately misled residents "BS" stating "we weren't saying that the water coming out of your tap was safe ... it said the source water is fine. After that, we explained what the problem is. It's misleading to tell people that the water is contaminated."

Records show that the mismanagement and corruption at the NWCDC occurred around the same time that the water's acidity levels started increasing which accelerated the corrosion of pipes that caused lead to leach into the water. Additionally, city officials later admitted that some records of water tests were "lost" during the period of corruption at the NWCDC.

== Lead exposure ==
Lead poisoning often occurs with no obvious symptoms, it frequently goes unrecognized. Lead poisoning can cause learning disabilities, behavioral problems, and, at very high levels, seizures, coma, and even death. No safe blood lead level has been identified. Pregnant women and children are most at risk. Lead exposure has been on the rise in New Jersey, especially in children. The highest numbers come from Newark in 2017, where 281 children between six months old and 26 months old tested in the city showed high lead levels in their blood.

Newark addresses the issue of elevated blood lead levels in children through several means, has been allotted and continues to seek grants from governmental and non-governmental sources. In the past decade, Newark has established and locally administers the State's only Lead-Safe Houses. The Lead-Safe Houses are used to relocate residents who have a child with an Elevated blood lead level (10 μg/dL or greater) when the family has no other temporary lead-safe housing alternatives.

== Timeline ==
=== 2016 ===
State and federal environment officials said that lead levels in multiple Newark Public Schools buildings were higher than the federal limit in March 2016. The trade union representing Newark public school teachers and the New Jersey Sierra Club said that the school leadership knew of the lead problem in the drinking water.

=== 2017 ===
New Jersey Department of Environmental Protection mandated cities and towns to test the water supply twice a year. A report published by the City of Newark stated the city violated the EPA's limit of lead levels in the drinking water.

=== 2018 ===
In February 2018, engineering company CDM Smith said in an email to the City of Newark stated their prevention of lead pipes dissolving into the water system "has not been effective". Subsequently, Newark distributed Pur water filters to affected residents but many were faulty and didn't work. During the height of the water crisis, Newark residents were able to receive 2 cases of 24 water bottles with proof of their address.

=== 2019 ===
In May 2019, the city added orthophosphate to help at prevent lead leaching. The chemical would take roughly six months to be effective. In August 2019, the city government received $120 million in funds to replace lead drinking water pipes throughout the city.

=== 2020 ===
According to new tests conducted by the state of New Jersey, lead levels have dropped.

=== 2021 ===
By August 2021, almost all of the lead water pipes in Newark had been replaced with copper ones, solving much of the water crisis problem. Mayor Ras Baraka continues to encourage Newark residents to trust the city and get their water tested, since it is free, to keep the water crisis from occurring again.

=== 2024 ===
In February 2024, officials announced that they found three properties with faulty service line replacements by a then un-named third party. The city had those lines replaced same day. In October 2024, it was announced that the company hired to replace a portion of the city's lead service lines, JAS Group Enterprise, Inc., lied and never performed the replacement work at 1,500 sites.

== Response and aftermath ==
Several news outlets, including The New York Times, compared the water crisis to the one in Flint, Michigan. The Natural Resources Defense Council sued the Newark city government in 2018, saying the city has violated federal and state regulations regarding lead levels in drinking water. Mayor of Newark wrote a letter to the President of the United States Donald Trump, asking for federal assistance and funds to help repair and rebuild the water infrastructure.

Introduced in September 2019, the Water Infrastructure Funding Transfer Act was passed by the United States Senate. It was sponsored by New Jersey Senator Cory Booker. The law allows the transfer of funds from the federal water fund to states. It was signed into law on September 27, 2019.

=== City response ===
In March 2019, Newark announced the Lead Service Line Replacement Program, which aimed to remove all 18,000 lead pipes throughout the water system. More than 38,000 water filters were distributed to city residents, in addition to bottled water. A November 2019 report released by the Newark city government said that "97.5% of the filters reduced lead to 10 parts-per-billion (ppb) or below." However, it was later reported that many of the filters were faulty and did not work properly.

=== Falsified replacement work ===
On February 7, 2024, officials announced that while inspecting four properties between January 1 and February 1, they found three properties with faulty service line replacements that were only partially replaced by a then un-named third party. The city had those lines replaced same day. As a result Newark and the New Jersey Department of Environmental Protection announced that they were going to audit all the lead line replacements in the entire city over several weeks. Notices of the discovery were mailed to approximately 180,000 households.

On October 3, 2024, United States Attorney for the District of New Jersey Philip R. Sellinger, announced that the company contracted to replace a portion of the lead service lines in Newark, JAS Group Enterprise, Inc. lied and falsified reports while not conducting the work they were hired to do at 1,500 Newark properties. The company had received more than $10 million for the work. From 2020 to 2022, the company falsified reports by submitting photographs to inspectors of copper pipes and claimed that they were the new replacement pipes they had installed. Some photographs were either intentionally blurry and others showed lead pipes partially obscured with dirt. The company "deliberately instructed workers to leave lead pipes in the ground" and where copper pipes already existed, workers were allegedly instructed to polish and clean them to make them look like newly installed replacement lines. One witness claims that this practice took place at hundreds of sites at the direction of a foreperson. Mayor Baraka claimed the health of Newark residents isn't in danger due to the orthophosphate that was added to the water to prevent lead leaching and that it is working as intended. City officials stated that they excavated 400 sites where the company claimed to have performed work and 28 of those sites still had lead pipes. The EPA stated that any lead pipes that were discovered have been replaced.
