= W. Michael McCabe =

American government officer

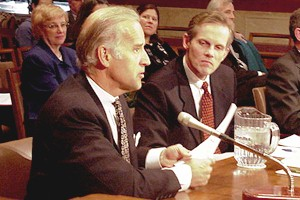
- McCabe with Joe Biden in 2000

Acting Administrator of the Environmental Protection Agency
- In office January 20, 2001 – January 31, 2001
- President: George W. Bush
- Preceded by: Carol Browner
- Succeeded by: Christine Todd Whitman

Deputy Administrator of the Environmental Protection Agency
- In office December 8, 1999 – January 20, 2001; Acting: December 8, 1999 – August 6, 2000
- President: Bill Clinton
- Preceded by: Fred Hansen
- Succeeded by: Linda Fisher

Personal details
- Education: Duke University (BA)

W. Michael McCabe is an American policy advisor specializing in environmental and energy policy. He had previously served as a Regional Administrator, and later Deputy Administrator of the United States Environmental Protection Agency (EPA), being the only person in the Agency's history to serve as both. Between 2003 and 2006, McCabe consulted for DuPont and led DuPont's defense against an EPA lawsuit of the toxic PFAS chemical PFOA. In November 2020 he was named a volunteer member of the Joe Biden presidential transition Agency Review Team.

== Early life and education ==
McCabe attended high school at Aiglon College in Switzerland, graduating in 1970. He earned his degree at Duke University, dual majoring in political science and sociology. He was secretary of the Student Union, and served on the Major Attractions and Major Speakers committees.

== Career ==
McCabe first served as a policy advisor to Gary Hart's successful 1974 Senate campaign. From 1975 to 1976, McCabe served as legislative assistant to the Senator, specializing in environmental and energy policy, including the promotion of energy efficiency and renewable energy. From 1976 to 1979, he also served as Staff Director of the bipartisan Congressional Environmental and Energy Study Conference. In 1980, McCabe organized and directed the national commemoration of the tenth anniversary of Earth Day. From 1981 to 1985, he served as Staff Director of the U.S. House of Representatives Energy Conservation and Power Subcommittee. From 1987 to 1995, McCabe was Senator Joe Biden's Communications and Projects Director serving as a senior advisor on Delaware issues.

In 1995, McCabe was appointed by President Clinton as the Regional Administrator of the EPA Middle Atlantic Region. As regional administrator, and in cooperation with governors and senior state officials, McCabe directed the implementation of federal environmental programs in the states of Delaware, Maryland, Pennsylvania, Virginia, West Virginia, and the District of Columbia. In 1997, he successfully levied a fine of $12.6 million against Smithfield Foods of Virginia for 6,900 violations of the Clean Water Act. The company had been found to have been discharging illegal levels of slaughterhouse waste into Virginia's Pagan River. He was nominated as Deputy Administrator of the EPA by President Clinton in 1999 and appointed to that position in 2000. He left that job on January 31, 2001, after briefly serving as Acting Administrator during the transition to the Administration of President George W. Bush.

McCabe started a consulting company, McCabe & Associates LLC, in 1996, registered in Delaware. From 2003 until at least 2006, McCabe worked as a consultant for DuPont, consulting for the company during an EPA investigation into the chemical PFOA. In 2007, Rob Bilott sued DuPont over PFOA contamination and McCabe was deposed in court by Bilott because of McCabe's previous work with DuPont.

In the fall of 2008, McCabe joined the Obama/Biden presidential transition team as leader of the group charged with identifying top environmental and energy appointments in the new administration. In 2009, McCabe was appointed by the New Jersey Superior Court to oversee the cleanup of 20 contaminated chromium sites located in low-income communities in Hudson County, New Jersey. For six years he served as independent Site Administrator for the Chromium Cleanup Partnership, a cooperative effort between the New Jersey Department of Environmental Protection, the government of Jersey City, and PPG, responsible for cleanup of toxic waste from a brownfield site where PPG had previously operated a chromium processing facility. His tenure in this position resulted in more than 1,000,000 tons of contaminated soil and waste being safely removed for future development. McCabe is currently the Principal at McCabe & Associates, a private consulting firm addressing energy and environmental policies based in Chadds Ford, Pennsylvania.

In November 2020, McCabe was named a volunteer member of the Joe Biden presidential transition Agency Review Team to support transition efforts related to the United States Environmental Protection Agency (EPA). In response to an email from The Intercept about McCabe's work for DuPont, Biden's transition team stated that McCabe has recused himself from any matters involving the Toxic Substances Control Act of 1976, and was committed to not taking a role in the Biden administration. Environmental activist Erin Brockovich called on Biden to "do the right thing" by creating an EPA transition team based on science, and not from the guidance of an "industry insider."

== Bibliography ==
- Condition Of The Mid-atlantic Estuaries. Diane Publishing Company. 1998. ISBN 9780756705060.
- An environmental characterization of the District of Columbia: a scientific foundation for setting an environmental agenda. U.S. Environmental Protection Agency, Region 3. 1997. EP 1.2:C 37/3.

== See also ==
- Michael McCabe, a former EPA official and aide to Joe Biden, led DuPont’s defense of the toxic PFAS chemical PFOA.
