= Mike Flynn (Environmental Protection Agency) =

American government official

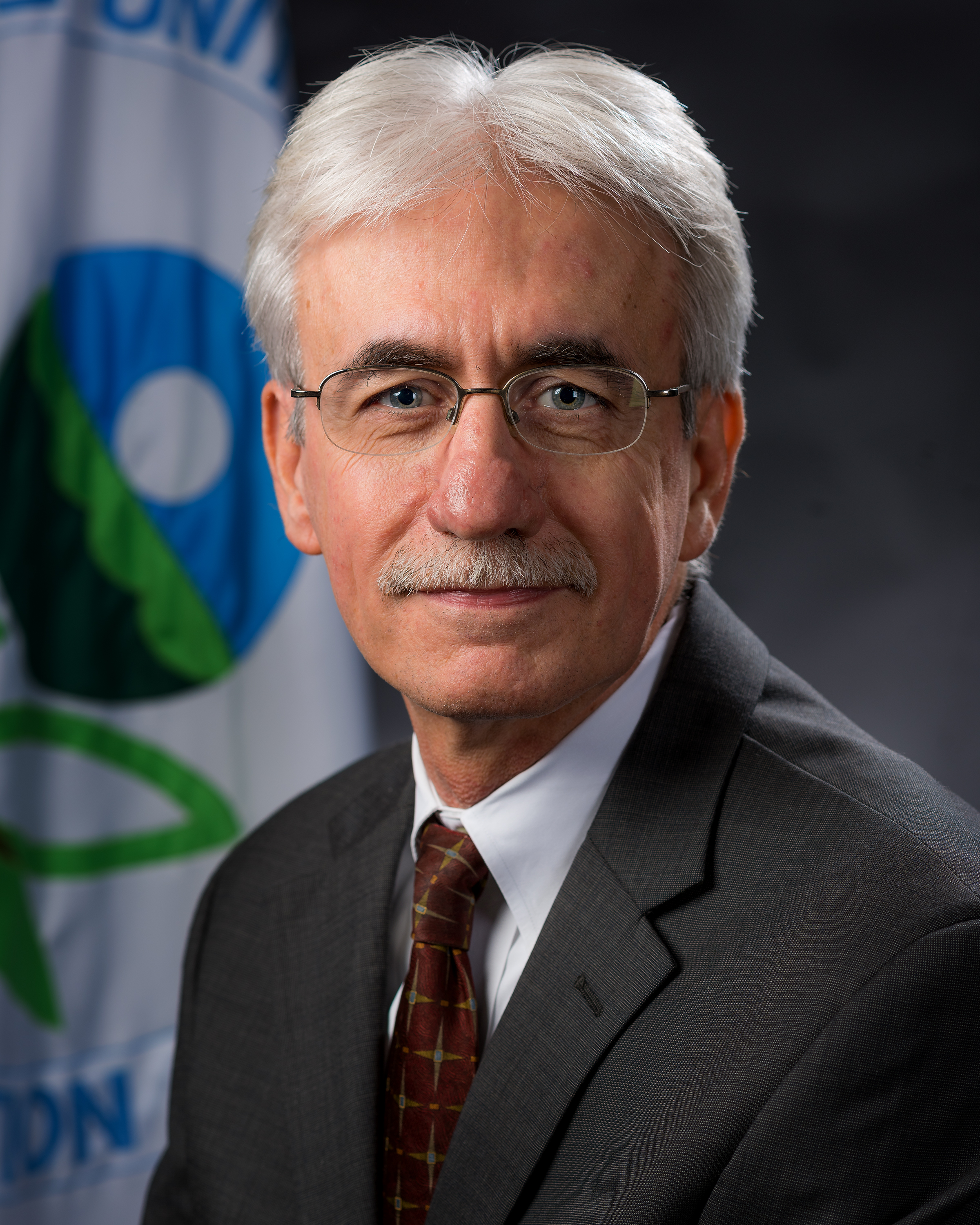

Acting Deputy Administrator of the Environmental Protection Agency
- In office January 20, 2017 – April 3, 2018
- President: Donald Trump
- Preceded by: Stan Meiburg (acting)
- Succeeded by: Andrew Wheeler

Personal details
- Education: University of Delaware (BS); University of North Carolina (MSPH)

Mike Flynn is an American government official who served as the Acting Deputy Administrator of the United States Environmental Protection Agency from 2017-2018.

== Career ==
Flynn joined the Environmental Protection agency in 1980 and served in a variety of positions including as the agency's Associate Deputy Administrator before being appointed deputy administrator. Flynn announced that he would retire in 2018. Andrew Wheeler was confirmed as Deputy Administrator of the EPA on April 12, 2018, replacing Flynn.
