= Doris Meissner =

American politician

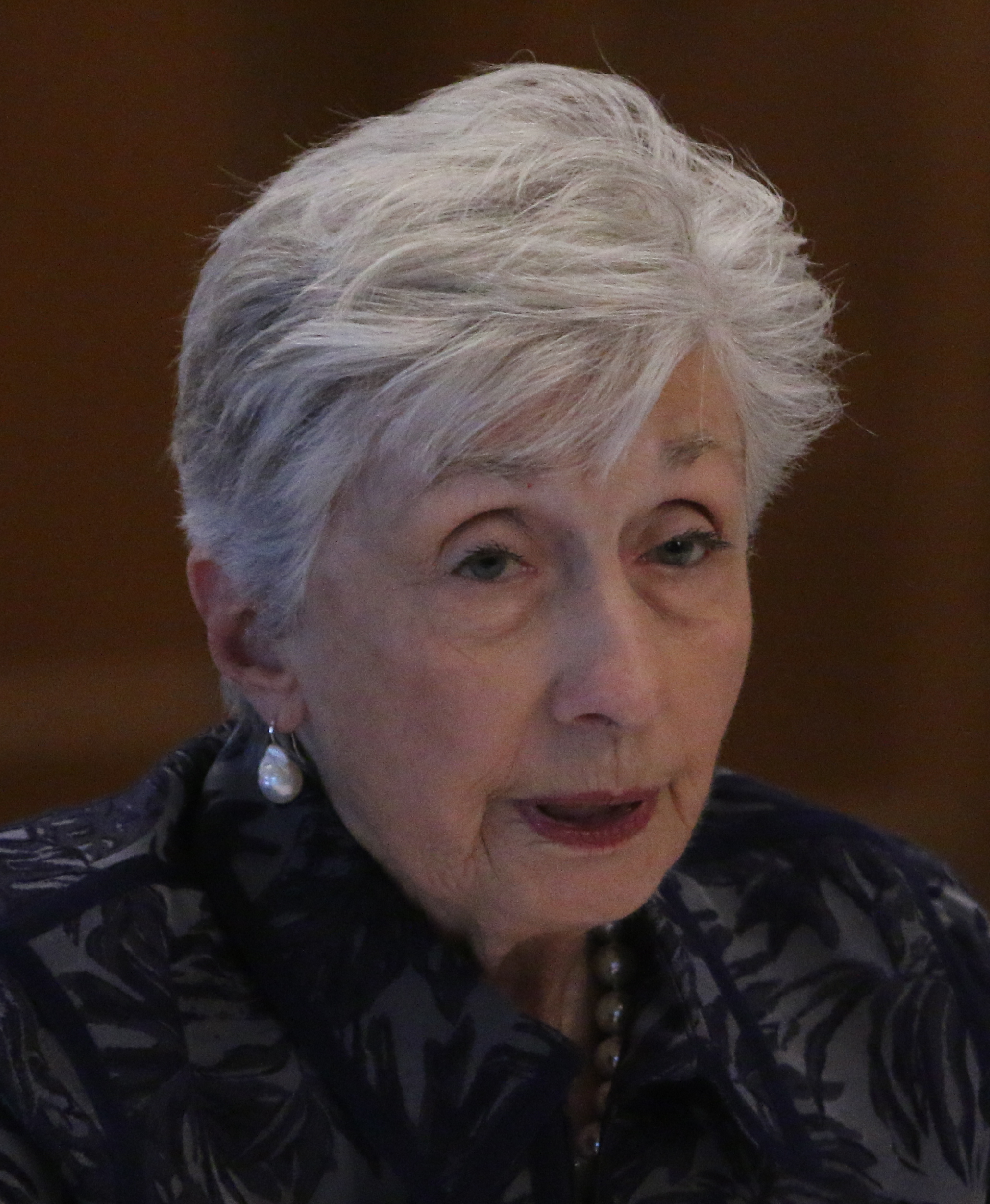
- Meissner in 2019

Commissioner of the Immigration and Naturalization Service
- In office October 18, 1993 – November 18, 2000
- President: Bill Clinton
- Preceded by: Gene McNary
- Succeeded by: James Ziglar

Personal details
- Born: Doris Marie Borst; November 3, 1941 (age 84) Milwaukee, Wisconsin, U.S.
- Party: Democratic
- Education: University of Wisconsin, Madison (BA, MA)

Doris Marie Meissner (born November 3, 1941) is a former Commissioner of the Immigration and Naturalization Service (INS), the agency previously responsible for immigration enforcement in the United States. She headed the INS from October 18, 1993 (nominated June 1993) to November 18, 2000, under United States President Bill Clinton and United States Attorney General Janet Reno. She is currently Senior Fellow and Director of the U.S. Immigration Policy Program at the Migration Policy Institute and has previously worked at the Carnegie Endowment for International Peace.

== Early life and education ==
Meissner was born in Milwaukee, Wisconsin, on November 3, 1941, to Hertha and Fred Borst, emigrants to the United States from Germany, who had arrived in the country via the Ellis Island inspection station in the 1920s. Meissner has cited her personal experience as a second-generation immigrant in a family speaking a foreign language as critical to helping her better empathize with the migrant perspective as she took on key roles in managing the United States immigration enforcement apparatus. Recalling an incident where her father, who had arrived in 1927, lost his naturalization papers in a fire, and was anxious if he could get a copy, she said: "When your parents are immigrants, you grow up understanding immigration in a way that you never could from a textbook: how precious and difficult it is."

She earned a Bachelor of Arts degree in 1963 and a Master of Arts degrees in 1969 (the latter in political science) from the University of Wisconsin–Madison.

While still a student, she managed the political campaign of Democratic politician Midge Miller, an opponent of the Vietnam War. The campaign was successful, with Miller defeating her opponent, a 20-year incumbent, in the Wisconsin state legislature, and assuming office in 1971.

== Professional life ==
=== Before 1973 ===
Meissner began her career as Assistant Director of Student Financial Aid at the University of Wisconsin–Madison.

With assistance from Midge Miller, whose campaign she had managed, Meissner became a founding member of the National Women's Political Caucus and its executive director in 1971. During the 1972 Democratic National Convention and Republican National Convention, she and groups of volunteers worked to change party rules to mandate larger rules for women in both parties.

=== 1973 to 1993 ===
In 1973, Meissner joined the U.S. Department of Justice as a White House Fellow and Special Assistant to the Attorney General. She served in a number of policy posts:

- 1975: Became Assistant Director of the Office of Policy and Planning
- 1976: Became Executive Director of the Cabinet Committee on Illegal Aliens
- 1977: Became Deputy Associate Attorney General (a post she held until 1980)

In 1981, under the Presidency of Ronald Reagan, she became Acting Commissioner of the INS and then Executive Associate Commissioner, then the third-ranking post.

In 1986, Meissner moved to the private sector as Senior Associate and Director of the Immigration Policy Project at the Carnegie Endowment for International Peace in Washington, D.C.

=== Tenure as INS Commissioner (1993 to 2000) ===
In June 1993, Meissner was nominated by then United States President Bill Clinton and worked as INS Commissioner under then United States Attorney General Janet Reno. The nomination came at a time when there was a growing demand for stronger but humane immigration and border enforcement. It occurred shortly after the accident where the Golden Venture, a cargo ship smuggling 286 undocumented immigrants from China ran aground on the beach in New York.

According to The New York Times, Meissner's appointment was viewed favorably because of her knowledge of the domain acquired through years of experience under both Democratic and Republican administrations, as well as the non-political nature of the appointment. A later New York Times article reviewing her first few years in office described her mandate as "keeping open America's front door while slamming shut the back."

Meissner's tenure at the INS was a critical time for the agency. Border enforcement was significantly ramped up under her watch, starting with preliminary measures like Operation Gatekeeper and Operation Hold the Line. She oversaw the agency's workforce double to 32,000 employees, and its annual budget triple to $4.3 billion. She also worked on cutting down the wait time for naturalization applications from two years to nine months, and reduced the backlog from 2 million to 800,000.

Many immigration advocacy groups and administration personnel praised Meissner's work. Frank Sharry of the National Immigration Forum said that she "performed admirably and impressively in an impossible job." Her boss, Janet Reno, the Attorney General at the time, called her "everyone's idea of the perfect public servant."

The INS, and Meissner personally, came under criticism for not doing enough to control the borders, at a time when cross-border movement was higher than in any previous period. The criticism came from Texas Representative Lamar Smith, chairman of the United States House Judiciary Subcommittee on Immigration and Border Security. Others who made withering criticisms of Meissner's record included T. J. Bonner, president of the National Border Patrol Council, and Dan Stein, executive director of Federation for American Immigration Reform. Specific issues that created controversy included plans to release 1500 nonviolent criminals to reduce crowding in detention centers as well as a naturalization drive that mistakenly allowed hundreds of criminals to become citizens due to flawed background checks. A U.S. Department of Justice report lambasted the INS for a malfunctioning fingerprinting process and a computer system so antiquated that officials couldn't determine exactly how many applicants they had. Other one-off issues, such as the return of Elián González to Cuba and INS' efforts to deport Hany Kiareldeen based on secret evidence (that were ultimately withdrawn), also put the INS and Meissner in the limelight.

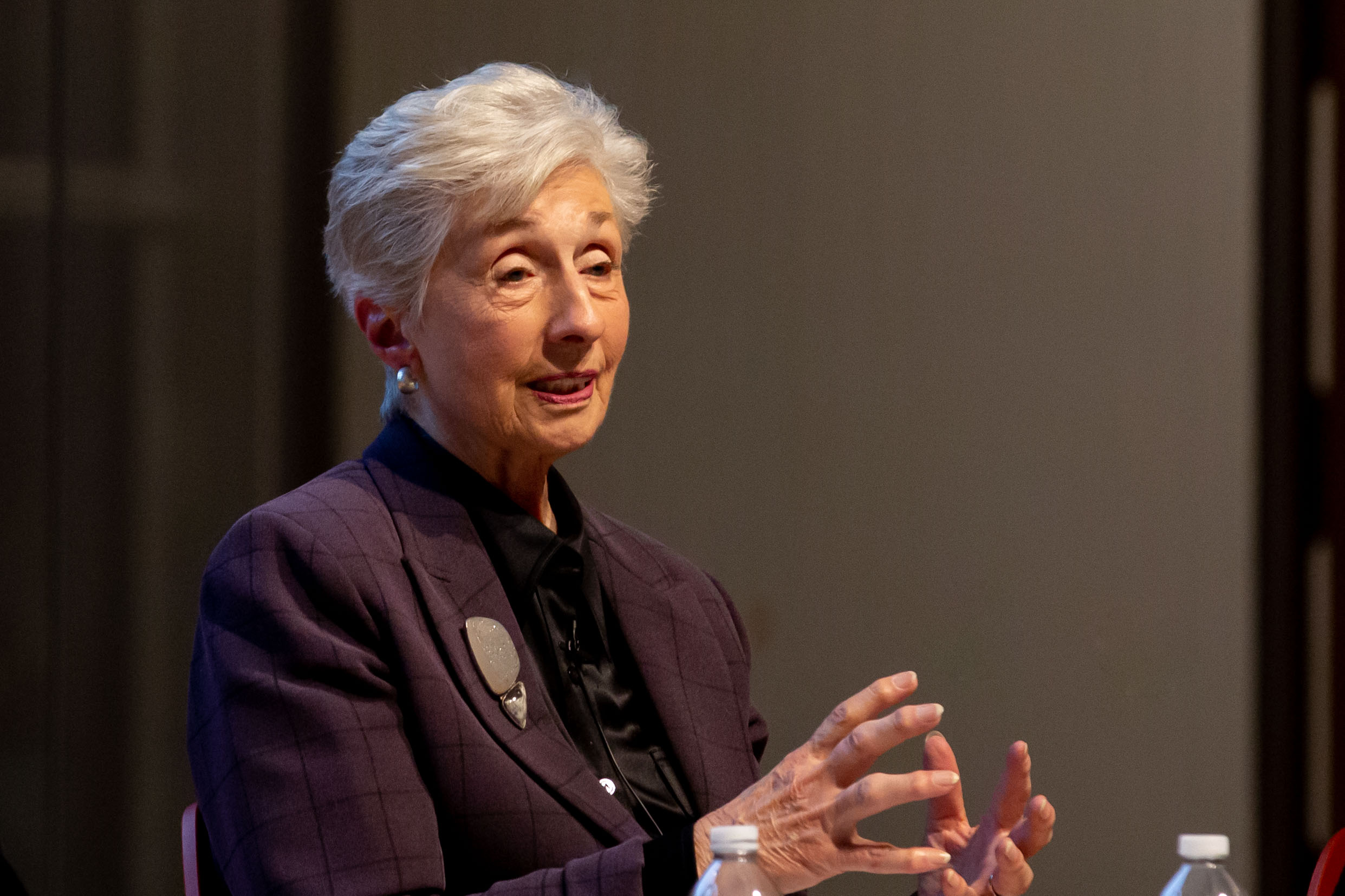
Meissner at the Edmond J. Safra Center for Ethics

=== Return to the Carnegie Endowment and subsequent work at the Migration Policy Institute ===
After finishing her tenure at the INS, Meissner' returned to work at the Carnegie Endowment for International Peace, on the Immigration Policy Project. In July 2001, Kathleen Newland and Demetrios G. Papademetriou created the Migration Policy Institute from the International Migration Policy Program at the Carnegie Endowment, and Meissner's Immigration Policy Project subsequently moved to MPI. Meissner currently holds the title of Senior Fellow and Director of the U.S. Immigration Policy Program.

=== Other affiliations and honors ===
Meissner is currently serving or has previously served on a number of distinguished boards and panels. These include the National Academy of Public Administration (Senior Fellow, since 2003) and the Administrative Conference of the United States. She is also a member of Washington, D.C.–based think tank the Inter-American Dialogue.

Among the honors she has received are the White House Fellowship mentioned above, a Department of Justice Special Commendation Award, and listings in Who's Who in America and Outstanding Young Women of America.

== Personal life ==
Meissner was married to Charles F. Meissner, who worked as an economist at the World Bank and later served as assistant commerce secretary under the administration of Bill Clinton. The two had met while undergraduates at the University of Wisconsin–Madison. Charles died in a plane crash in Croatia, along with Commerce Secretary Ronald H. Brown and 31 others. The couple has two grown children.

== See also ==
- Kathleen Newland, co-founder of the Migration Policy Institute
- United States Secretary of Homeland Security, the position that would (approximately) replace that of INS Commissioner, after the restructuring of the INS as sub-agencies of the newly created U.S. Department of Homeland Security. The first few Secretaries of Homeland Security were Tom Ridge, Michael Chertoff, Janet Napolitano, and Jeh Johnson
- USCIS Commissioner, another position that could be considered a successor to the position of INS Commissioner. The first few USCIS Commissioners were Eduardo Aguirre, Emilio T. Gonzalez, Alejandro Mayorkas, and León Rodríguez.

Political offices
Preceded by Gene McNary	Commissioner of the Immigration and Naturalization Service; 1993–2000	Succeeded by James Ziglar
