= Stimson Center =

American think tank (est. 1989)

- Abbreviation: Stimson
- Formation: 1989; 37 years ago
- Type: Think tank
- Legal status: 501(c)3
- Headquarters: 1211 Connecticut Avenue NW, 8th Floor
- Location: Washington, D.C., United States
- President: Brian Finlay
- Budget: Revenue: $12.6 million Expenses: $10.7 million (FYE 2021)
- Website: stimson.org

The Stimson Center is a nonprofit, nonpartisan US think tank based in Washington D.C., that analyzes issues related to global peace. It is named after the American lawyer and politician Henry L. Stimson.

Founded in 1989 by Barry Blechman and Michael Krepon, the center conducts research and policy engagement across international security and governance issues. It analyzes issues such as nuclear proliferation, arms trafficking, water management, wildlife poaching, and responses to humanitarian crises. It also provides consulting for US and international institutions and publishes articles for the general public. The center also convenes dialogues on global challenges.

== History ==
The Stimson Center was founded in 1989 by Barry Blechman (1943-2025) and Michael Krepon. In 2024, Susan Chodakewitz succeeded Herbert "Hawk" Carlisle as chair of the board. Following the death of President and CEO Brian Finlay in June 2026, Rachel Stohl became Acting President and CEO.

The center is funded by research contracts, grants from foundations and other donations. It publicly discloses funding sources on an annual basis.

In 2013, Stimson received the MacArthur Award for Creative and Effective Institutions. Stimson was ranked the 10th best US think tank in the University of Pennsylvania's 2020 Global Go To Think Tanks Report.

In 2025, the center launched new regional initiatives focused on Latin America and the Caribbean, and North Africa.

== Research activity ==
Since, then, the Stimson Center conducts research, engagement, and solutions building across five thematic areas: Trade and Technology, Security and Strategy, Human Security and Governance, Climate and Natural Resources, and Pivotal Places, a geographic topic that largely covers work on Asia and the Indo-Pacific. In the 2020s, the organization has about twenty different policy programs, including:

=== 38 North ===
The 38 North program cultivates public policy debate about North Korea, emphasizing hands-on experience and expertise with the authoritative 38north.org web journal, in-depth research on issues central to North Korean strategic thinking, and informal diplomatic engagement. Other major projects include North Korea's Economy: A Glimpse Through Imagery, a commercial satellite imagery analysis series focused on the North Korean economy in partnership with the National Geospatial-Intelligence Agency, and the DPRK Digital Atlas, a comprehensive geospatial dataset based on open source data of DPRK political, economic, cultural and security infrastructure.

38 North's satellite imagery analysis has been used to monitor developments at North Korea's Sohae Satellite Launching Station. In July 2018, its analysis of commercial satellite imagery identified the dismantling of an engine test stand and a rail-mounted processing building at the site. In March 2019, 38 North reported that subsequent reconstruction had returned the site to normal operating status following the Hanoi Summit between President Donald Trump and North Korean leader Kim Jong Un.

=== East Asia ===
The East Asia program conducts research on regional security issues and offers recommendations for policymakers in the US and in the region on a variety of issues. The program analyzes the dynamics of cross-strait relations, including the exchange of ideas and people between the US and Asia-Pacific region. The program also examines China's foreign relations toward Northeast and Southeast Asia, with a special focus on Myanmar, Iran, and Africa, and addresses US–Japan alliance relations and developments on the Korean Peninsula.

In 2025, the center relaunched its Korean program under the direction of Je Heon (J. James) Kim.

=== Environmental security ===
The environmental security program explores how increased stress on global ecosystems and shared natural resources may compromise economic development, fuel social conflict, and undermine political stability in key areas throughout the world.

In 2025, research associated with the center highlighted risks posed by toxic mining contamination in Southeast Asia river systems, particularly in the Mekong region.

=== Middle East ===
The Middle East program explores issues that affect regional security from the Mediterranean to the Persian Gulf. They study cross-border dynamics in the region, and are focused on the rising threat from sectarianism and its roots in radical Islamic ideology. The program's Gulf Security work analyzes traditional and nontraditional security issues impacting the Gulf States and their neighbors. In 2015, the program is monitoring the regional security repercussions of the Iran nuclear negotiations.

=== South Asia ===
The South Asia program seeks to reduce nuclear dangers in South Asia by focusing on risks associated with the accelerating arms competition between India and Pakistan. These risks are amplified by the activities of terrorist groups and political instability in the region. The program has championed confidence-building and nuclear risk-reduction measures in South Asia for over twenty years. The South Asia program analyzes U.S. crisis management on the subcontinent, producing case studies of the "Twin Peaks" and Mumbai crises, and identifying future challenges. The program seeks to empower an emerging generation of strategic analysts in South Asia by means of the South Asian Voices website, conferences, and visiting fellowships.

=== Southeast Asia ===
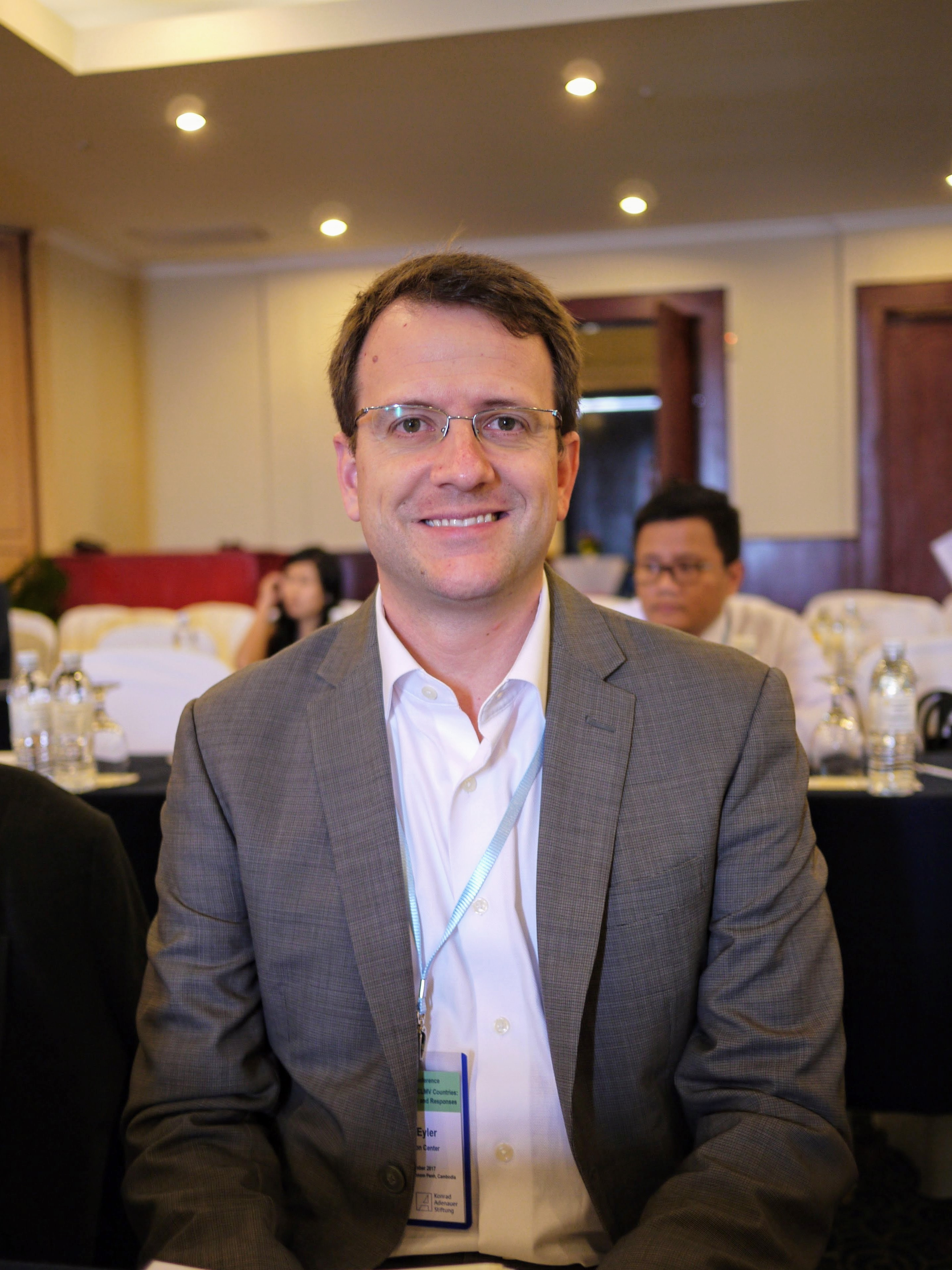
Brian Eyler is the Director of the Stimson Center's Southeast Asia program, and is regarded as an expert on transboundary issues in the Mekong region and China's economic relationship with Southeast Asia.

The Southeast Asia program addresses major challenges facing the region today, ranging from the food-water-energy security nexus in the Mekong Basin to political and economic issues of Association of Southeast Asian Nations (ASEAN) integration. The main focus of the program's research is development in the Greater Mekong Subregion, particularly hydroelectric power projects and their impacts on the food-water-security nexus and regional stability. The program also regularly addresses trade, economic, and political issues involving ASEAN member states, U.S.–ASEAN relations and policy issues, and maritime security issues in the South China Sea, particularly territorial disputes and fishery management.

=== Latin America and Caribbean ===
In 2025, the center launched a Latin America and Caribbean program focused on regional governance, security, and developmental issues.

=== North Africa ===
The Center launched a North Africa program in 2025 examining political, economic, and security developments in the region.

== Publications ==
The Stimson Center publishes reports and policy analyses on international security, governance, environmetnal issues, and regional affairs. A selection of recent publications includes:

- "Confronting the Crisis of Global Governance" – A report from the Commission on Global Security, Justice and Governance that details a practical action plan for innovating global governance, as well as offering ways to mobilize diverse actors to advance reform to better respond to 21st century threats, challenges, and opportunities.
- "Recommendations and Report of the Task Force on US Drone Policy" – This report details recommendations for overhauling UAV strategy, improving oversight, accountability and transparency, developing forward-looking international norms relating to the use of lethal force in nontraditional settings, and devising sound UAV export control and research and development policies.
- "A New US Defense Strategy for a New Era: Military Superiority, Agility and Efficiency" – This report sets out ten key operating principles that emphasize greater efficiency and effectiveness throughout the Defense Department and finds that a successful defense strategy could be achieved at budget levels significantly lower than present.
- "Global Governance Innovation Report 2025" - A governance and multilateralism report examining implementation of the UN "Pact for the Future", environmental governance reform, and institutional responses to climate and geopolitical crises.
- "Future of International Cooperation Report 2025" - Procuded with contributing institutions: Doha Forum, Global Governance Innovation Network, Global Institute for Strategic Research, and the Stimson Center. A report focusing on global governance, justice, multilateral reform, and international institutional cooperation.
- "Unregulated Mining Along Rivers in Mainland Southeast Asia" (2025) - Research publication examining toxic mining contamination and river-system impacts across Southeast Asia and the Mekong region.
- "Centering Protection Across the Full Spectrum of Peace Operations" (2025) - A peacekeeping and civilian-protection policy memo submitted in connection with the UN Secretary General's review of future peace operations.
- "Beyond Denial: Toward a Credible Cyber Deterrence Strategy" - Analytical paper examining cyber deterrence, accountability mechanisms, and international cyber norms.

== Key people ==
- Brian Finlay (President & CEO, 2015–2026)
- Herbert "Hawk" Carlisle (Chairman, 2022–2024)
- Barry Blechman (Co-Founder/Emeritus, Chairman 1989–2007, Board 2014–2025)
- Michael Krepon (Co-Founder/Emeritus, 1989–2022)

== Board of directors ==
- Kris M. Balderston (General Manager of FleishmanHillard, former legislative director to Senator Hillary Clinton) (2016–Present)
- John B. Bellinger III (Former Legal Adviser for the US Department of State) (2017–Present)
- Lincoln P. Bloomfield Jr. (Former ambassador) (Emeritus, 2005–Present)
- Kenneth C. Brill (Retired ambassador) (2012–Present)
- Susan Chodakewitz (Nathan Associates, Inc.) (2015–Present)
- Lansing Crane (Crane & Company) (1995-2007)
- Bowman Cutter (Roosevelt Institute) (2016–Present)
- Lori Fisler Damrosch (Columbia Law School) (2014–Present)
- Alton Frye (Emeritus, 1990–Present)
- Robert Gallucci (Retired US diplomat)
- Gary R. Gregg (Retired insurance executive) (2012–Present)
- Francis Q. Hoang (Momentum Aviation Group) (2015–Present)
- Michelle Howard (retired US Navy Admiral)
- Leslie Ireland (Former Assistant Secretary of the Treasury) (2017–Present)
- Andrea Koppel (Mercy Corps) (2008–Present)
- Brett B. Lambert (Former Deputy Assistant Secretary of Defense) (2014–Present)
- Alice Maroni (Pension Benefit Guaranty Corporation) (2011–Present)
- Richard Morrissey (Sullivan & Cromwell LLP)
- John V. Parachini (RAND Corporation) (2016–Present)
- Nicole Piasecki (Boeing Commercial Airplanes) (2016–Present)
- Thomas R. Pickering (Former ambassador) (Emeritus, 2001–Present)
- Zack Porter (Proteus Environmental Technologies) (2016–Present)
- Mary Speiser (Former intelligence analyst) (2016–Present)
- Fred Whitridge Jr. (Archipelago Corporation) (2013–Present)

== Former board members ==
- Duane Andrews (retired CEO, Qinetiq North America) (2014–Present)
- Les Aspin (1994–1995)
- Zoë Baird (1990–1991)
- Charles W. Bailey II (Emeritus, 1991–2004)
- Courtney Banks Spaeth (Growth) (2014–Present)
- Linda Banton (2001–2010)
- Retired US Navy Vice Admiral Kevin J. Cosgriff (Vice Chairman)
- Andrew J. Czekaj (Cambridge Holdings) (2012–Present)
- Barbara Davis Blum (2001–2010)
- Avis Bohlen (2004–2013)
- K. David Boyer (2001–2002)
- Richard Clarke (1997–2010)
- Elmer Cooper (1991–1995)
- Carlos Del Toro (SBG Technology Solutions) (2019-2021)
- William Harrop (2001–2011)
- W. Bradford Gary (2010-2013)
- Arnold Kanter (1994–2005)
- Farooq Kathwari (2003–2014)
- Peter Lavoy (2014)
- Roger Leeds (1990–2005)
- Frank Loy (1990–1998, 2002–2005)
- Jane Holl Lute (2013–2014)
- Leo Mackay Jr. (Director, 1998–2001)
- Norman P. Neureiter (2005–2012)
- Kathleen Newland (Migration Policy Institute)
- Philip Odeen (2001–2014)
- Anne Richard (2006–2011)
- Condoleezza Rice (1991–2001)
- Rozanne L. Ridgway (1997–2001)
- Enid Schoettle (1992–2010)
- Jeffrey Smith (1990–2010)
- Leonard Spector (1989–1997)
- Howard Stoertz (1991–1997)
- Richard Thornburgh (1994–1997)
- Larry Welch (1997–2009)
- Carroll Wetzel (2000–2011)
- John Wickham (1992–1998)
- Susan Williams (1990–2002)
- Willard Wirtz (1991–1993)
- Robert O. Boorstin (2007–2015)
- Laurie S. Fulton (2014–2016)
- Jean-Francois Seznec (2009–2016)

== Awards and honours ==
- Ranked 10th of the "Top Think Tanks in the United States" in the University of Pennsylvania's "2020 Global Go To Think Tank Index Report".
- Winner of the MacArthur Foundation’s Award for Creative and Effective Institutions in 2013.
- Given 5-Star (Highly Transparent) rating by Transparify’s 2015 report, "How Transparent are Think Tanks about Who Funds Them 2015?"
