= John R. Quarles Jr. =

American attorney (1935–2012)

Acting Administrator of the Environmental Protection Agency
- In office January 21, 1977 – March 6, 1977
- President: Jimmy Carter
- Preceded by: Russell E. Train
- Succeeded by: Douglas M. Costle

2nd Deputy Administrator of the United States Environmental Protection Agency
- In office April 29, 1973 – January 20, 1977
- President: Richard Nixon; Gerald Ford
- Preceded by: Robert W. Fri
- Succeeded by: Barbara Blum

Personal details
- Born: April 26, 1935 Boston, Massachusetts
- Died: October 29, 2012 (aged 77) Warrenton, Virginia
- Party: Republican

John R. Quarles Jr. (April 26, 1935 – October 29, 2012) was an American attorney who served as the Deputy Administrator of the United States Environmental Protection Agency (EPA).

Quarles graduated from Yale University and Harvard Law School. He joined the United States Department of the Interior in 1969 and assisted in the establishment of EPA in 1970. He later served as EPA's General Counsel, and Deputy Administrator from 1973 to 1977. He was later a partner and chairman of Morgan Lewis, a law firm in Washington, D.C. He retired from Morgan Lewis in 2006.

== Personal life ==
John Quarles married Barbara (née Harris) in 1962. They had four children together: Laura, Nancy, Jack, and Ben.

Quarles died of Alzheimer's disease on October 29, 2012, in Warrenton, Virginia at age 77.

== Works ==
- Quarles, John (1976). Cleaning Up America: An Insider's View of the Environmental Protection Agency. New York: Houghton Mifflin. ISBN 9780395247723.
- Quarles, John (1978). Federal Regulation of New Industrial Plants. Real estate law and practice course handbook series. New York: Practising Law Institute. LCCN 78057572. OCLC 5061124.
