= Seznec =

- Pronunciation: pronounced [ˈsɛːsnek]

Origin
- Origin: Breton
- Meaning: sunbeam place
- Region of origin: Brittany

Seznec is a surname of Breton origin. It may refer to any the following people:

Seznec derives from saezh which means sunbeam or arrow in Breton and the suffix -e.g. is very frequently used to form names designating a place by what is found there.

- André Seznec, French computer scientist
- Christian Seznec (born 1952), French road bicycle racer
- Guillaume Seznec, charged and imprisoned in the Seznec affair, a controversial French court case of 1923–1924
- Jean Seznec (1905–1983), French historian and mythographer
- Jean-François Seznec, French political scientist
- Marie Seznec Martinez (born 1958), French stylist and ex-model
- Reynald Seznec (born 1953), French engineer and businessman
