= Robert W. Fri =

American administrator

Robert Fri
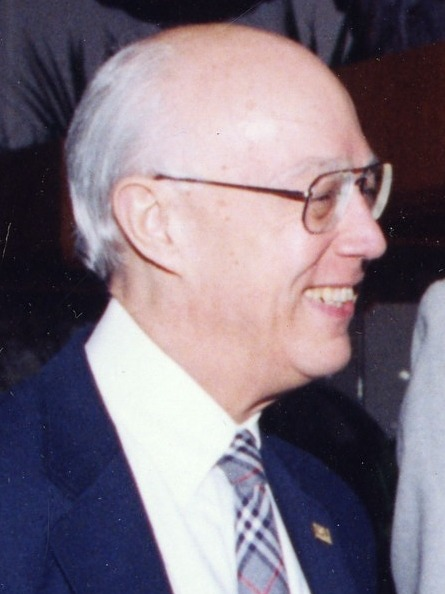
- Fri in 1996

Administrator of the Energy Research and Development Administration
- Acting
- In office January 20, 1977 – September 30, 1977
- President: Gerald Ford
- Preceded by: Robert Seamans
- Succeeded by: James Schlesinger (Secretary of Energy)

Administrator of the Environmental Protection Agency
- Acting
- In office April 30, 1973 – September 12, 1973
- President: Richard Nixon
- Preceded by: William Ruckelshaus
- Succeeded by: Russell E. Train

Deputy Administrator of the Environmental Protection Agency
- In office June 14, 1971 – April 29, 1973
- President: Richard Nixon
- Preceded by: Position established
- Succeeded by: John Quarles

Personal details
- Born: November 16, 1935 Kansas City, Kansas, U.S.
- Died: October 10, 2014 (aged 78) Bethesda, Maryland, U.S.
- Party: Republican
- Education: Rice University (BA); Harvard University (MBA)

Fri (standing, furthest left) with other officials at the 1999 signing ceremony of a curatorial agreement between the Miami Museum of Science and the Smithsonian Institution

Robert W. Fri (November 16, 1935 – October 10, 2014) was an American administrator who served as the Deputy Administrator of the United States Environmental Protection Agency from 1971 to 1973.

Fri served as director of the Smithsonian Museum of Natural History from 1996 to 2001.

He died of lung cancer on October 10, 2014, in Bethesda, Maryland, at age 78.

Political offices
New office	Deputy Administrator of the Environmental Protection Agency; Acting; 1971–1973	Succeeded by John Quarles
Preceded by William Ruckelshaus	Administrator of the Environmental Protection Agency; Acting; 1973	Succeeded by Russell E. Train
Preceded by Robert Seamans	Administrator of the Energy Research and Development Administration; Acting; 1977	Succeeded by James Schlesinger as Secretary of Energy
