= Michael Fix =

American economist

Michael E. Fix is an American economist known for his research on immigration, especially illegal immigration to the United States. He is a senior fellow at the Migration Policy Institute, of which he formerly served as president.

== Education and career ==
Fix has a bachelor's degree from Princeton University, a J.D. from the University of Virginia, and did graduate work at the London School of Economics. He first joined the Urban Institute as a research associate in 1977, where he was promoted to senior research associate in 1983. In 1994, he became a principal research associate at the Urban Institute, and in 1998, he was named their Director of Immigration Studies. He joined the Migration Policy Institute as co-director of their National Center on Immigrant Integration Policy in 2005. He was later promoted to vice president of the Institute in 2008, and was later named its president. He stepped down from his position as president of the Institute in summer 2017, while remaining a senior fellow there.
