= Schlesinger Report =

The Schlesinger Report, originally titled A Review of the Intelligence Community, was the product of a survey authorized by U.S. President Richard Nixon late in 1970. The objective of the survey was to identify and alleviate factors of ineffectiveness within the United States Intelligence Community (IC) organization, planning, and preparedness for future growth. The report, prepared by James Schlesinger, Deputy Director of the Office of Management and Budget (OMB), was submitted to Nixon on 10 March 1971.

The survey was the first of the IC reform attempts to specifically address the growing technological capabilities of the IC and their impact on the collection process. The report highlighted two "disturbing phenomena" within the IC: an "impressive rise in ... size and cost" and the "apparent inability to achieve a commensurate improvement in the scope and overall quality of intelligence products." The report analyzed issues pertaining to organizational fragmentation, lack of interagency centralization, costly emerging technologies, duplication of collection and analysis, and institutional disorganization, and offered the administration several practical options for improving IC functions. Major recommendations included: creating a Director of National Intelligence (DNI), strengthening the role of the Director of Central Intelligence (DCI), and establishing an interagency coordinator for national intelligence functions.

== History ==
Following the 1968 presidential election, the newly elected Nixon administration immediately focused its attention on the IC. Nixon and his National Security Advisor Henry Kissinger initially viewed the IC, particularly the Central Intelligence Agency (CIA), with condescension, believing it was not sharing important information with the administration. Additionally, Nixon felt that steadily increasing capabilities and costs directed toward IC functions should naturally be yielding a better intelligence product. Nixon also lost faith with the analytical arm of the IC when the Cambodian coup of 1970 took the administration by surprise.

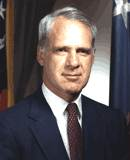
James Schlesinger

Since little evidence indicated a direct correlation between intelligence expenditures and quality outputs, Nixon commissioned James Schlesinger to conduct a survey of the IC. Schlesinger's goal was to identify problems within the IC and recommend ideas for improvement. While Schlesinger is credited as chief preparer of the document, it was drafted by Arnold Donohue of the OMB.

== Overview of the report ==
While the entire original document is still classified, the 47-page report, with redactions, has been made available through Freedom of Information Act requests. Redacted sections include classified data, primarily regarding budgetary figures and national security issues, with the exception of Vietnam.

=== Sections of the report ===
The report is divided into 10 sections:

- Introduction: The Costs and Benefits of Intelligence
- Cost Trends
- Questions About the Product
- Organizational Dilemmas
- Specific Organizational Issues
- Leadership of the Community
- Department of Defense Leadership
- Changing Functional Boundaries and Costs
- Toward Improvements in the Product
- Appendices (classified)

==== Introduction: the costs and benefits of intelligence ====
The report began by providing an overview of the need for "constructive change" within the IC. The aim was to achieve a "closer relationship between cost and effectiveness" by seeking "fundamental reform of the community's decisionmaking bodies and procedures." Schlesinger warned that in the "absence of reorganization ... the habits of intelligence community will remain as difficult to control as was the performance of the Department of Defense prior to the Defense Reorganization Act of 1958."

==== Cost trends ====
This section of the report provided an historical background of the development of intelligence functions and role distinctions. "The National Security Act of 1947 and the National Security Council Intelligence Directives (NSCIDs) of the late 1940s and early 1950s established the basic division of responsibilities among agencies and departments." These basic divisions granted the roles of "non-military" and "national intelligence" to CIA, particularly to employ human intelligence (HUMINT) and clandestine collection operations. The State Department was tasked with the "overt collection of 'non-military' intelligence", while the National Security Agency (NSA) was given the responsibility of collecting communications and signals intelligence (COMINT and SIGINT). The responsibilities of "military" and tactical "wartime" intelligence were given to the Military Services. All intelligence agencies and services were permitted to produce "departmental intelligence" for individual and institutional needs.

Schlesinger pointed out that these role distinctions "worked reasonably well into the mid-1950s", but went on to say:

The line between "military" and "non-military" has faded; scientific and technical intelligence with both civilian and military applications has become a principal area of endeavor for almost all intelligence organizations. Similarly, under the old distinctions, the national leadership--namely the President and the NSC--concerned itself with "national" intelligence, while presumably only battlefield commanders cared about tactical intelligence. But a rapidly advancing technology which has revolutionized the collection, processing, and communication of intelligence data casts doubt on the validity of the distinctions.

This "faded" distinction had resulted in four fundamental problems that contributed to the increasing cost of IC activities:

1. Functions had become fragmented and disorganized.
2. Competition for collection had resulted in community-wide, unproductive duplication.
3. IC was inadequately prepared for growth.
4. Fragmentation and the scramble for new technologies had resulted in exceedingly expensive activities.

==== Questions about the product ====
As the IC was increasingly shifting resources towards collection, there emerged a "presumption in today's intelligence set-up that additional data collection rather than improved analysis, will provide the answer to particular intelligence problems". Increased collection led to an overabundance of "imperfect" information that began to inundate analysts. This led to a trend in which collectors began to direct production, resulting a process of collection relevant to the collectors' own interests. Schlesinger referred to the production phase of intelligence as the "stepchild of the community", in which analysts "with a heavy burden of responsibility, find themselves swamped with data" at a time when new hypotheses needed to be tested, particularly regarding the USSR.

==== Organizational dilemmas ====
This section of the report outlined one of the primary shortcomings of the IC—the lack of authoritative and directive leadership between IC agencies. The lack of solid leadership stemmed from "the failure of the National Security Act of 1947 to anticipate the 'constitutional' needs of a modern and technologically complex intelligence community". Schlesinger's cited the relatively small size and scope of intelligence programs in 1947. Additionally, in 1947, the Military Services dominated the intelligence community, naturally opposing centralization among non-military services. Schlesinger did, however, point out in this section of the report that the National Security Act of 1947 did say that CIA would "coordinate 'the intelligence activities' of the Government under the direction of the National Security Council". Nevertheless, previous DCIs did not fully capitalize on this ascribed authority to coordinate the IC to interact efficiently without major compromises. The office of DCI could not realize its full potential because:

- "As an agency head he bears a number of weighty operational and advisory responsibilities which limit the effort he can devote to community-wide management."
- "He bears a particularly heavy burden for the planning and conduct of covert actions."
- "His multiple roles as community leader, agency head, and intelligence adviser to the President, and to a number of sensitive executive committees, are mutually conflicting."
- "He is a competitor for resources within the community owing to his responsibilities as Director of CIA (DCI), which has large collection programs of its own; thus he cannot be wholly objective in providing guidance for community-wide collection."
- "He controls (redacted) percent of the community's resources and must therefore rely on the persuasion to influence his colleagues regarding the allocation and management of the other (redacted) percent, which is appropriated to the DoD. Since Defense is legally responsible for these very large resources, it feels that it cannot be bound by outside advice on how they should be used."
- "The DCI is outranked by other departmental heads who report directly to the President and are his immediate supervisors on the NSC."

Based on his analysis, Schlesinger points out that effective reform must address:

- "The leadership of the community as a whole."
- "The direction and control of Defense intelligence activities."
- "The division of functions among the major intelligence agencies."
- "The structuring, staffing, and funding of the processes by which our raw intelligence data are analyzed and interpreted."

==== Specific organizational issues ====
Schlesinger described several key specific organizational issues that new policies should address:

- "The power over resources available to the leader of the community."
- "The size and functions of the staff provided to the leader of the community." Considerations should include:
  - planning
  - control
  - "supervision of R&D"
  - inspections and reviews of current programs
  - "production and dissemination of national estimates"
  - "net assessments of US, allied, and opposing capabilities and doctrines"
- "The future role of the United States Intelligence Board (USIB)."
- "Future DoD control over the resources under its jurisdiction."
- "The jurisdiction of either a national leader or a Defense leader over the Military Services."
- "The future functional boundaries of the major intelligence agencies."
- "The number and location of national analytical and estimating centers."
- "The role of the independent review mechanism."

==== Leadership of the community ====
Schlesinger recommended three options for the new role of community leader:

1. Create the position of Director of National Intelligence (DNI). The office of the DNI would be responsible for the major collection assets and activities, and would receive a majority of the intelligence budget. The position would oversee the national estimate center. CIA would continue to be in charge of covert and clandestine services, and DoS and DoD would retain groups at the production level to provide products to their individual leaderships and to contribute to national intelligence.
2. The second option suggested a modified role of the DCI, dividing the CIA into two groups. One of these divisions would be responsible for production, primarily serving the office of DCI. The other faction would continue to focus on collection, but it would be led by a new director. In this capacity, the DCI would be responsible for the intelligence budget and recommendations to the president on behalf of the office of DCI, the modified CIA, and DoD.
3. A third option that Schlesinger suggested would create the position of Coordinator of National Intelligence. In this capacity, the coordinator would oversee the entire IC from a chiefly managerial perspective, focusing of resources, needs, and evaluate production quality.

==== Department of Defense leadership ====
Another critical change recommended by Schlesinger was the need for a single office in charge of all DoD intelligence functions. He pointed out that, while the Deputy Secretary of Defense had historically been given this responsibility, the lack of staff and resources drastically limited the position's effectiveness. Schlesinger recommended that it would be necessary to either create a Director of Defense Intelligence in charge of DoD's collection responsibilities, or beef up the existing office of Deputy Secretary of Defense to efficiently handle the Department's intelligence assets and duties.

==== Changing functional boundaries and costs ====
Schlesinger pointed out that the IC budget had been reduced in the last two years (exact figures are classified). In this section, he made several observations regarding the difficulties of budget cuts and restructuring:

- Salary and price increases are likely to offset the perceived budgetary savings.
- IC should anticipate a large increase in research and development costs.
- As the US withdraws from the conflict in Southeast Asia, the IC will be able to reduce SIGINT and HUMINT resources, but the savings would not be significant to meet future demands.
- Sufficient savings may only be attainable by reorganizing the boundaries of military and national intelligence to consolidate resources.

Schlesinger concluded that, while cutbacks should be pursued, significant budgetary reductions should not be endeavored until reorganization has proven successful.

==== Toward improvements in the product ====
The report ended with an assessment for improved intelligence production. Schlesinger pointed out that, while the acquisition of new technologies and collection capabilities was important, the best way to improve the quality of IC output was to focus on making improvements in analysis:

But preliminary investigation suggests that higher quality is much more likely to come about within the framework of a coherently organized community which is focused on improving output rather than input. Indeed, it seems a fair assumption that the President would be willing to rebate some of the potential savings from the community if he had any hope of improved performance as a consequence.

The report listed several general steps that may be taken to improve analysis and production:

- Increase consumer representation and better communication of needs
- Provide for internal product evaluation sections within the individual organizations
- Improve the existing analytical centers, making DIA competitive with CIA
- Conduct external reviews of hypotheses and analytical methods
- Establish a national assessment group to check validate hypotheses
- Create stronger incentives for well-trained analysts and improve personnel resources
- Focus resources toward learning new methods of analysis and estimation

His conclusion, however, conceded that it was difficult at present time to determine the specific changes to be made regarding improved analysis, but reiterated that this should be the top priority of the new leadership once reorganization has been conducted.

== See also ==
- James Schlesinger
- United States Intelligence Community
- Richard Nixon
- Office of Management and Budget
- Central Intelligence Agency
- Director of Central Intelligence
- United States Department of Defense
