= James R. Schlesinger =

American politician (1929–2014)

James Schlesinger
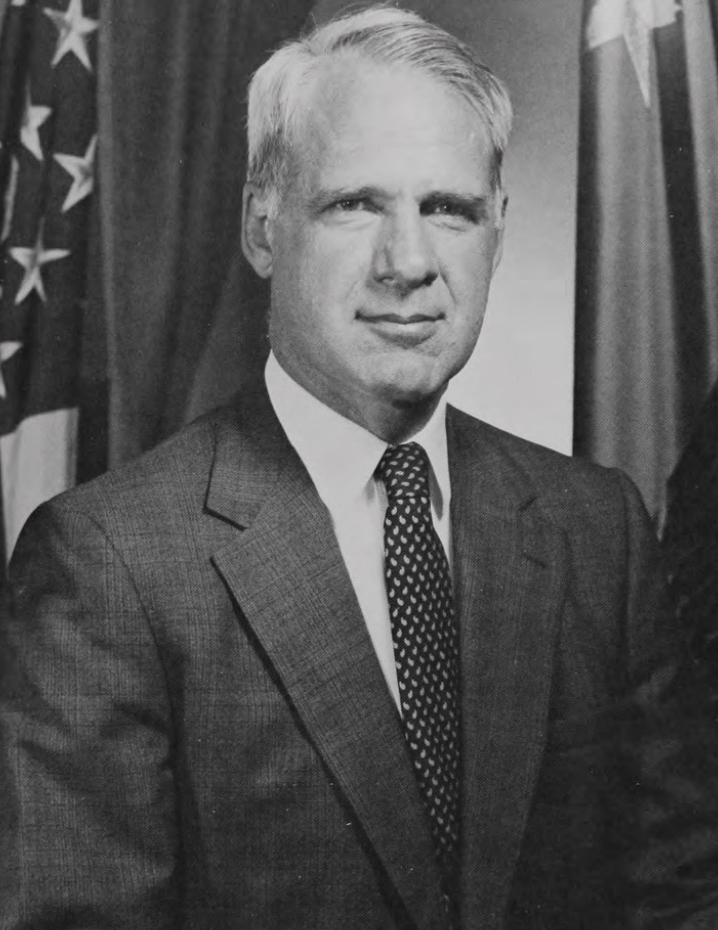
- Official portrait

1st United States Secretary of Energy
- In office August 9, 1977 – August 23, 1979
- President: Jimmy Carter
- Preceded by: John F. O'Leary (Federal Energy Administration); Robert W. Fri (Energy Research and Development Administration)
- Succeeded by: Charles Duncan Jr.

12th United States Secretary of Defense
- In office July 2, 1973 – November 19, 1975
- President: Richard Nixon; Gerald Ford
- Preceded by: Elliot Richardson
- Succeeded by: Donald Rumsfeld

9th Director of Central Intelligence
- In office February 2, 1973 – July 2, 1973
- President: Richard Nixon
- Deputy: Vernon A. Walters
- Preceded by: Richard Helms
- Succeeded by: Vernon A. Walters (acting)

Chair of the Atomic Energy Commission
- In office August 17, 1971 – January 26, 1973
- President: Richard Nixon
- Preceded by: Glenn T. Seaborg
- Succeeded by: Dixy Lee Ray

Personal details
- Born: James Rodney Schlesinger; February 15, 1929 New York City, New York, U.S.
- Died: March 27, 2014 (aged 85) Baltimore, Maryland, U.S.
- Party: Republican
- Spouse: Rachel Line Mellinger (m. 1954; died 1995)
- Children: 8
- Education: Harvard University (BA, MA, PhD)

James Rodney Schlesinger (February 15, 1929 – March 27, 2014) was an American economist and statesman who was best known for serving as Secretary of Defense from 1973 to 1975 under Presidents Richard Nixon and Gerald Ford. Prior to becoming Secretary of Defense, he served as Chair of the Atomic Energy Commission (AEC) from 1971 to 1973, and as CIA Director for a few months in 1973. He became America's first Secretary of Energy under Jimmy Carter in 1977, serving until 1979.

While Secretary of Defense, he opposed amnesty for draft resistors and pressed for development of more sophisticated nuclear weapon systems. Additionally, his support for the A-10 and the lightweight fighter program (later the F-16) helped ensure that they were carried to completion.

== Early life and career ==
James Rodney Schlesinger was born in New York City, the son of Jewish parents, Rhea Lillian (née Rogen) and Julius Schlesinger. His mother was a Lithuanian-Jewish émigré from what was then part of the Russian Empire whilst his father's family was of Austrian-Jewish origins. He converted to Lutheranism in his early twenties. Schlesinger was educated at the Horace Mann School and Harvard University, where he earned a B.A. (1950), M.A. (1952), and Ph.D. (1956) in economics. Between 1955 and 1963 he taught economics at the University of Virginia and in 1960 published The Political Economy of National Security. In 1963, he moved to the RAND Corporation, where he worked until 1969, in the later years as director of strategic studies.

=== Nixon Administration ===
In 1969, Schlesinger joined the Nixon administration as assistant director of the Bureau of the Budget, devoting most of his time to Defense matters. In 1971, President Nixon appointed Schlesinger a member of the Atomic Energy Commission (AEC) and designated him as chairman. Serving in this position for about a year and a half, Schlesinger instituted extensive organizational and management changes in an effort to improve the AEC's regulatory performance.

==== CIA Director ====
Schlesinger was CIA Director from February 2, 1973, to July 2, 1973. He was succeeded by William Colby.

Schlesinger was extremely unpopular with CIA staff, as he reduced CIA staff by 7%, and was considered a Nixon loyalist seeking to make the agency more obedient to Nixon. He had a CCTV camera installed near his official portrait at the CIA headquarters in Langley, Va., as it was believed that vandalism of the portrait by disgruntled staff was likely.

== Secretary of Defense (1973–1975) ==
Schlesinger left the CIA to become Secretary of Defense on July 2, aged 44. As a university professor, researcher at Rand, and government official in three agencies, he had acquired an impressive resume in national security affairs.

=== Nuclear strategy ===
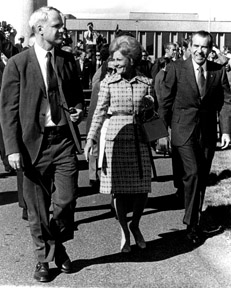
Schlesinger with Richard Nixon in September 1971

Shortly after assuming office, Schlesinger outlined the basic objectives that would guide his administration: maintain a "strong defense establishment"; "assure the military balance so necessary to deterrence and a more enduring peace"; obtain for members of the military "the respect, dignity and support that are their due"; assume "an . . . obligation to use our citizens' resources wisely"; and "become increasingly competitive with potential adversaries.... [W]e must not be forced out of the market on land, at sea, or in the air. Eli Whitney belongs to us, not to our competitors." In particular, Schlesinger saw a need in the post-Vietnam era to restore the morale and prestige of the military services; modernize strategic doctrine and programs; step up research and development; and shore up a DoD budget that had been declining since 1968.

Analyzing strategy, Schlesinger maintained that the theory and practice of the 1950s and 1960s had been overtaken by events, particularly the rise of the Soviet Union to virtual nuclear parity with the United States and the effect this development had on the concept of deterrence. Schlesinger believed that "deterrence is not a substitute for defense; defense capabilities, representing the potential for effective counteraction, are the essential condition of deterrence." He had grave doubts about the assured destruction strategy, which relied on massive nuclear attacks against an enemy's urban-industrial areas. Credible strategic nuclear deterrence, the secretary felt, depended on fulfilling several conditions: maintaining essential equivalence with the Soviet Union in force effectiveness; maintaining a highly survivable force that could be withheld or targeted against an enemy's economic base in order to deter coercive or desperation attacks against U.S. population or economic targets; establishing a fast-response force that could act to deter additional enemy attacks; and establishing a range of capabilities sufficient to convince all nations that the United States was equal to its strongest competitors.

To meet these needs, Schlesinger built on existing ideas in developing a flexible response nuclear strategy, which, with the President's approval, he made public by early 1974. The United States, Schlesinger said, needed the ability, in the event of a nuclear attack, to respond so as to "limit the chances of uncontrolled escalation" and "hit meaningful targets" without causing widespread collateral damage. The nation's assured destruction force would be withheld in the hope that the enemy would not attack U.S. cities. In rejecting assured destruction, Schlesinger quoted President Nixon: "Should a President, in the event of a nuclear attack, be left with the single option of ordering the mass destruction of enemy civilians, in the face of the certainty that it would be followed by the mass slaughter of Americans?"

With this approach, Schlesinger moved to a partial counterforce policy, emphasizing Soviet military targets such as ICBM missile installations, avoiding initial attacks on population centers, and minimizing unintended collateral damage. He explicitly disavowed any intention to acquire a destabilizing first-strike capability against the USSR. But he wanted "an offensive capability of such size and composition that all will perceive it as in overall balance with the strategic forces of any potential opponent."

Schlesinger devoted much attention to the North Atlantic Treaty Organization, citing the need to strengthen its conventional capabilities. He rejected the old assumption that NATO did not need a direct counter to Warsaw Pact conventional forces because it could rely on tactical and strategic nuclear weapons, noting that the approximate nuclear parity between the United States and the Soviets in the 1970s made this stand inappropriate. He rejected the argument that NATO could not afford a conventional counterweight to Warsaw Pact forces. In his discussions with NATO leaders, Schlesinger promoted the concept of burden-sharing, stressing the troubles that the United States faced in the mid-1970s because of an unfavorable balance of international payments. He urged qualitative improvements in NATO forces, including equipment standardization, and an increase in defense spending by NATO governments of up to five percent of their gross national product.

=== Yom Kippur War and Cyprus crisis ===
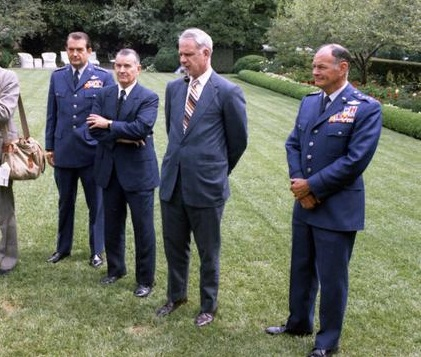
Secretary of Defense James Schlesinger with Chairman of The Joint Chiefs of Staff General George S. Brown and Deputy Secretary of Defense Bill Clements and Air Force Chief of Staff General David C. Jones at The White House Lawn in January 1975.

Schlesinger had an abiding interest in strategic theory, but he also had to deal with a succession of immediate crises that tested his administrative and political skills. In October 1973, three months after he took office, Arab countries launched a surprise attack on Israel and started the Yom Kippur War. A few days after the war started, with Israel not faring as well as expected militarily, the Soviets resupplying some Arab countries and the Israeli government having authorized the use and assembly of nuclear weapons, the United States began an overt operation to airlift materiel to Israel. As Schlesinger explained, the initial U.S. policy to avoid direct involvement rested on the assumption that Israel would win quickly. But when it became clear that the Israelis faced more formidable military forces than anticipated, and could not meet their own resupply arrangements, the United States took up the burden. According to Henry Kissinger, with the president's authority, the directive was made to resupply Israel with the needed equipment and eliminate State Department delay. "It was alleged that the airlift was deliberately delayed as a maneuver to pressure Israel." Schlesinger rejected charges that the Defense Department delayed the resupply effort to avoid irritating the Arab states and that he had had a serious disagreement over this matter with Secretary of State Henry Kissinger. Eventually the combatants agreed to a cease-fire, but not before the Soviet Union threatened to intervene on the Arab side and the United States declared a higher level worldwide alert of its forces.

Another crisis flared in July 1974 within the NATO alliance when Turkish forces, concerned about the long-term lack of safety for the minority Turkish community, invaded Cyprus after the Cypriot National Guard, supported by the Greek junta, overthrew President Archbishop Makarios. When the fighting stopped, the Turks held the northern portion of country and about 40 percent of the island. Turkey's military action caused controversy in the United States, because of protests and lobbying by supporters of the Greek Cypriot side and, officially, because Turkish forces used some U.S.-supplied military equipment intended solely for NATO purposes.

He felt the Turks had overstepped the bounds of legitimate NATO interests in Cyprus and suggested that the United States might have to reexamine its military aid program to Turkey. During this time, President Gerald R. Ford had succeeded Nixon after his resignation; eventually Ford and Secretary of State Henry Kissinger made it clear with two presidential vetoes that they favored continued military assistance to Turkey as a valued NATO ally, but Congress overrode both vetoes and in December 1974 prohibited such aid, which instituted an arms embargo that lasted five years.

=== Indochina ===
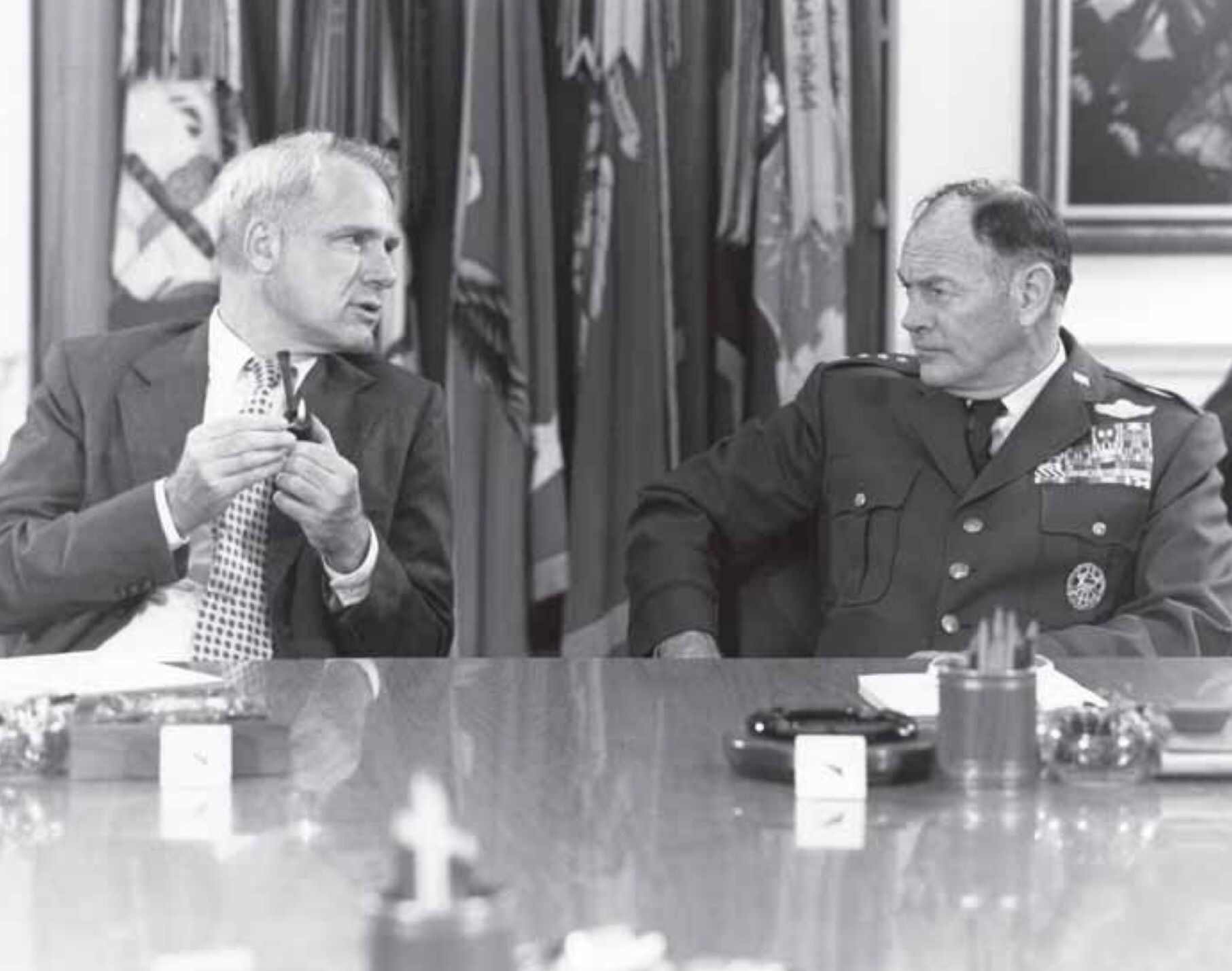
Secretary of Defense James Schlesinger with Chairman of The Joint Chiefs of Staff General George S. Brown at The Pentagon, November 18, 1974.

The last phase of the Vietnam War occurred during Schlesinger's tenure. Although all U.S. combat forces had left South Vietnam in the spring of 1973, the United States continued to maintain a military presence in other areas of Southeast Asia. Some senators criticized Schlesinger and questioned him sharply during his confirmation hearings in June 1973 after he stated that he would recommend resumption of U.S. bombing in North Vietnam and Laos if North Vietnam launched a major offensive against South Vietnam. However, when the North Vietnamese began their 1975 Spring Offensive, the United States could do little to help the South Vietnamese, who collapsed completely as the North Vietnamese captured Saigon in late April. Schlesinger announced early in the morning of 29 April 1975 the evacuation from Saigon by helicopter of the last U.S. diplomatic, military and civilian personnel.

Only one other notable event remained in the Indochina drama. In May 1975 Khmer Rouge forces boarded and captured the crew of the Mayaguez, an unarmed U.S.-registered freighter. The United States bombarded military and fuel installations on the Cambodian mainland while Marines landed by helicopter on an offshore island to rescue the crew. The 39 captives were retrieved, but the operation cost the lives of 41 U.S. military personnel. Nevertheless, the majority of the American people seemed to approve of the administration's decisive action.

=== Defense budget ===
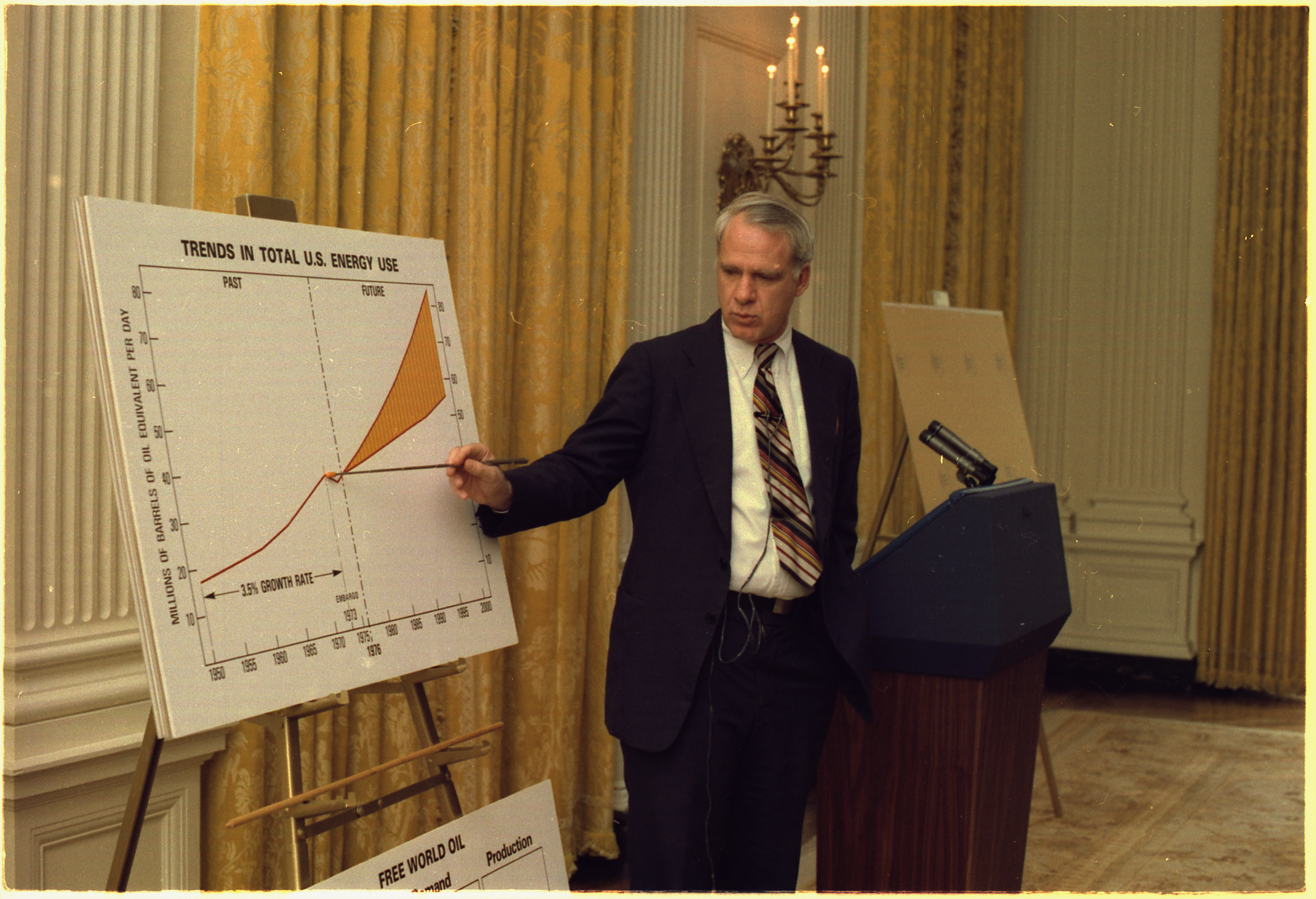
Schlesinger give a briefing to the press.

Unsurprisingly, given his determination to build up U.S. strategic and conventional forces, Schlesinger devoted much time and effort to the Defense budget. Even before becoming secretary, in a speech in San Francisco in September 1972, he warned that it was time "to call a halt to the self-defeating game of cutting defense outlays, this process, that seems to have become addictive, of chopping away year after year." Shortly after he took office, he complained about "the post-war follies" of Defense budget-cutting. Later he outlined the facts about the DoD budget: In real terms it had been reduced by one-third since FY 1968; it was one-eighth below the pre-Vietnam War FY 1964 budget; purchases of equipment, consumables, and R&D were down 45 percent from the wartime peak and about $10 billion in constant dollars below the prewar level; Defense now absorbed about 6 percent of the gross national product, the lowest percentage since before the Korean War; military manpower was at the lowest point since before the Korean War; and Defense spending amounted to about 17 percent of total national expenditures, the lowest since before the Pearl Harbor attack in 1941. Armed with these statistics, and alarmed by continuing Soviet weapon advances, Schlesinger became a vigorous advocate of larger DoD budgets. But he had little success. For FY 1975, Congress provided TOA of $86.1 billion, compared with $81.6 billion in FY 1974; for FY 1976, the amount was $95.6 billion, an increase of 3.4 percent, but in real terms slightly less than it had been in FY 1955.

=== Dismissal as Secretary of Defense ===
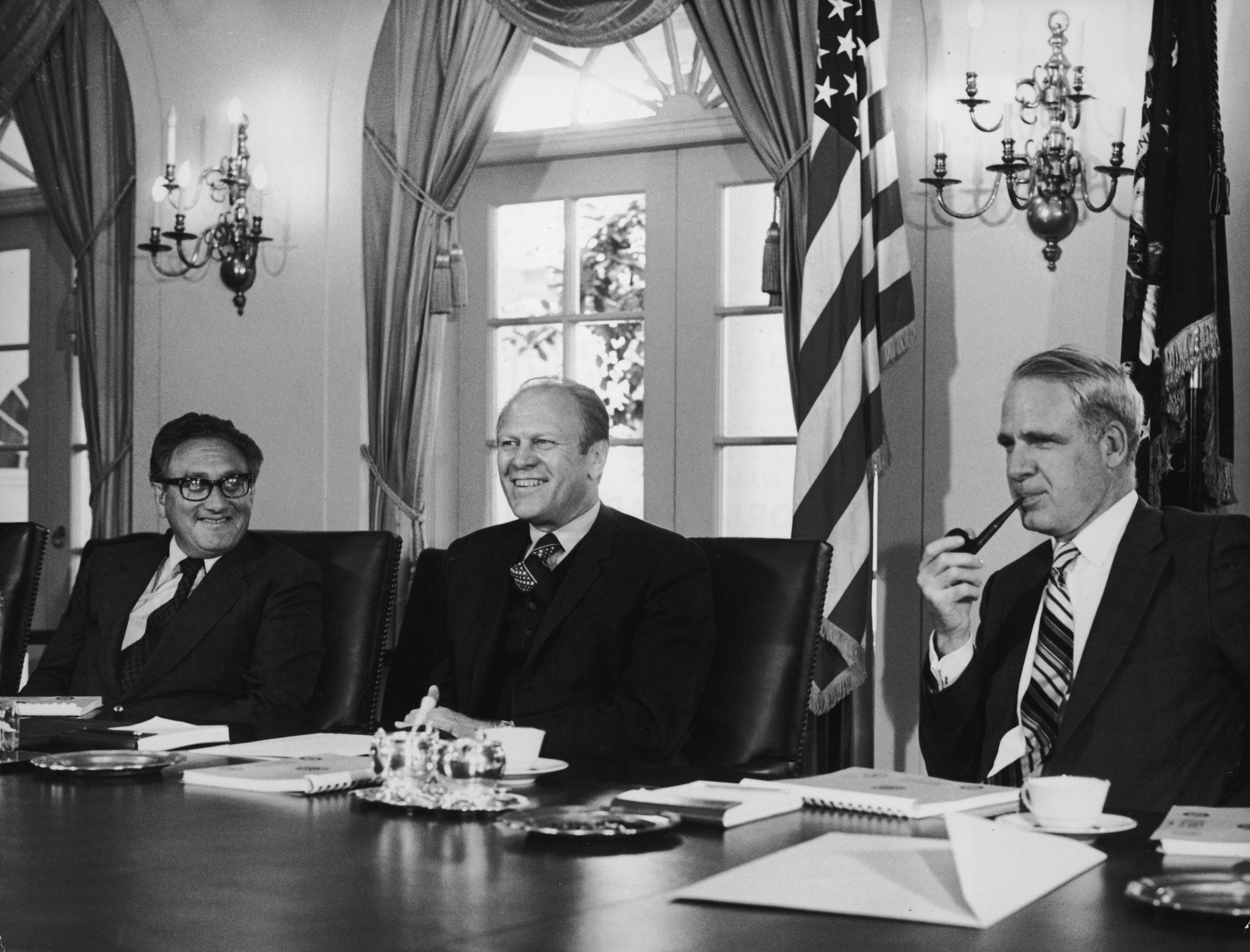
Secretary of Defense James R. Schlesinger with President Gerald R. Ford and Secretary of State Henry Kissinger during a briefing at The White House, November 1974.

Schlesinger's insistence on higher defense budgets, his disagreements within the administration and with Congress on this issue, and his differences with Secretary of State Kissinger all contributed to his dismissal by President Ford in November 1975. Schlesinger's legacy included the development of the close-air support aircraft the A-10 and the lightweight F-16 fighter. Kissinger strongly supported the Strategic Arms Limitation Talks process, while Schlesinger wanted assurances that arms control agreements would not put the United States in a strategic position inferior to the Soviet Union. The secretary's harsh criticism of some congressional leaders dismayed President Ford, who was more willing than Schlesinger to compromise on the Defense budget. On 2 November 1975, the president dismissed Schlesinger and made other personnel changes. Kissinger lost his position as special assistant to the President for national security affairs but remained as Secretary of State. Schlesinger left office on 19 November 1975, explaining his departure in terms of his budgetary differences with the White House.

The main reason behind Schlesinger's dismissal, though at the time unreported, was his insubordination toward President Ford. During the Mayaguez incident, Ford ordered several retaliatory strikes against Cambodia. Schlesinger told Ford the first strike was carried out, but Ford later learned that Schlesinger, who disagreed with the order, had none of them carried out. According to Bob Woodward's 1999 book, Shadow, Ford let the incident go, but when Schlesinger committed further insubordination on other matters, Ford fired him. Woodward observes, "The United States had just lost a war for the first time. That the president and the secretary of defense could not agree on who was in charge was appalling. [This] unpublicized breakdown in the military chain of command was perhaps the most significant scandal of the Ford presidency." Schlesinger had also disobeyed Ford when told to send as many military aircraft as possible to evacuate South Vietnam. Schlesinger disagreed with doing so and did not send the aircraft. Woodward says that an elected president, which Ford was not, would never have tolerated the insubordination.

In spite of the controversy surrounding both his tenure and dismissal, Schlesinger was by most accounts an able secretary of defense. A serious and perceptive thinker on nuclear strategy, he was determined that the United States not fall seriously behind the Soviet Union in conventional and nuclear forces and devoted himself to modernization of defense policies and programs. He got along well with the military leadership because he proposed to give them more resources, consulted with them regularly, and shared many of their views. Because he was a forthright speaker who could be blunt in his opinions and did not enjoy the personal rapport with legislators that prior Secretary of Defense Melvin Laird had, his relations with Congress were often strained. A majority of its members may have approved Schlesinger's strategic plans, but they kept a tight rein on the money for his programs.

== Secretary of Energy (1977–1979) ==
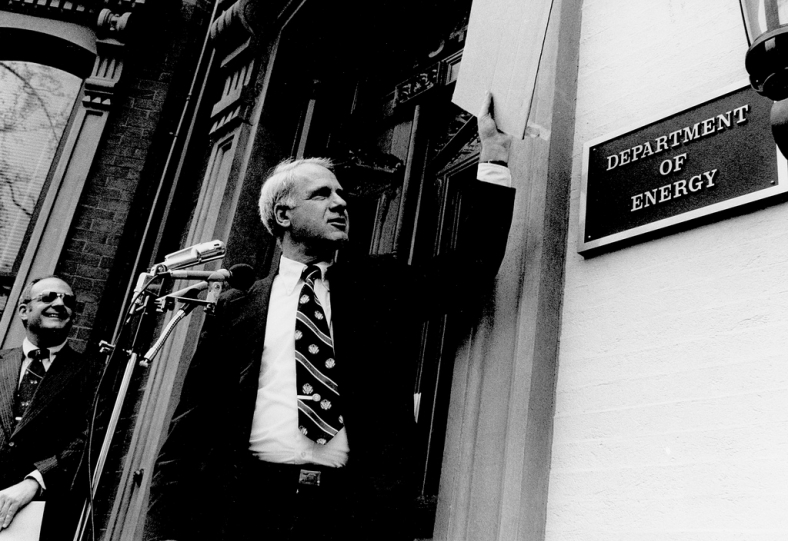
Schlesinger while serving as Energy Secretary

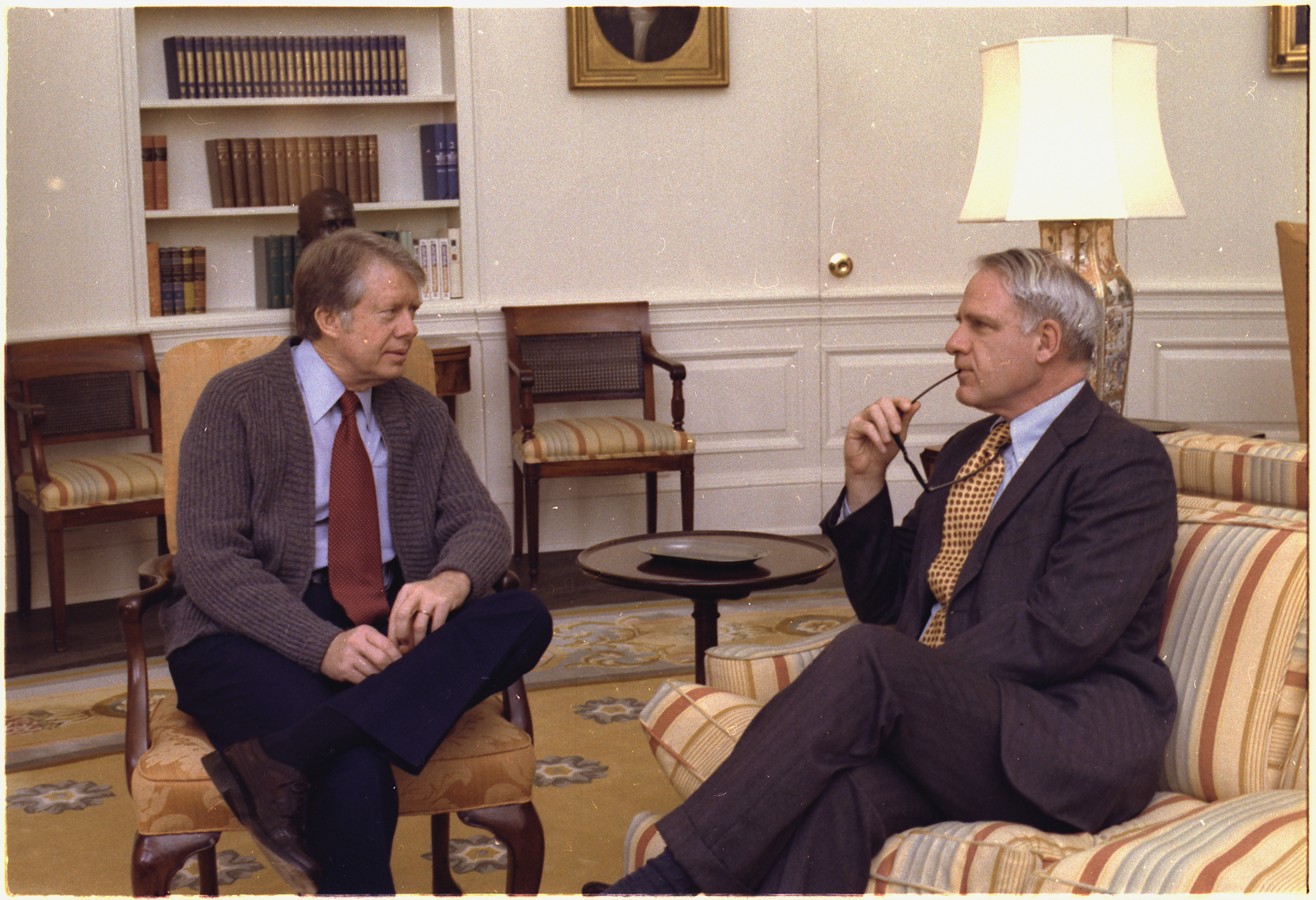
Secretary of Energy James Schlesinger with President Jimmy Carter at The Oval Office on March 23, 1977.

After leaving the Pentagon, Schlesinger wrote and spoke forcefully about national security issues, especially the Soviet threat and the need for the United States to maintain adequate defenses. When Jimmy Carter became president in January 1977 he appointed Schlesinger, a Republican, as his special adviser on energy and subsequently as the first Secretary of Energy in October 1977. According to one account, "Schlesinger impressed candidate Jimmy Carter with his brains, his high-level experience... and with secrets regarding the defense spending vacillations of his old boss, Ford, just in time for the presidential debates."

As Energy Secretary, Schlesinger launched the Department's Carbon Dioxide Effects and Assessment Program shortly after the creation of that department in 1977. Secretary Schlesinger also oversaw the integration of the energy powers of more than 50 agencies, such as the Federal Energy Administration and the Federal Power Commission. In July 1979, Carter replaced him as part of a broader Cabinet shakeup. According to journalist Paul Glastris, "Carter fired Schlesinger in 1979 in part for the same reason Gerald Ford had—he was unbearably arrogant and impatient with lesser minds who disagreed with him, and hence inept at dealing with Congress."

=== Climate change memo ===
On July 7, 1977 Schlesinger read and attached a note to a memo about the catastrophic effects of climate change entitled "Release of Fossil CO2 and the Possibility of a Catastrophic Climate Change", his note read:

My view is that the policy implications of this issue are still too uncertain to warrant Presidential involvement and policy initiatives.

The note encouraged then President Carter to dismiss the issue, and therefore contributed to the long-held dismissal of climate-related discourse and action within the US government.

== Post-government activities ==
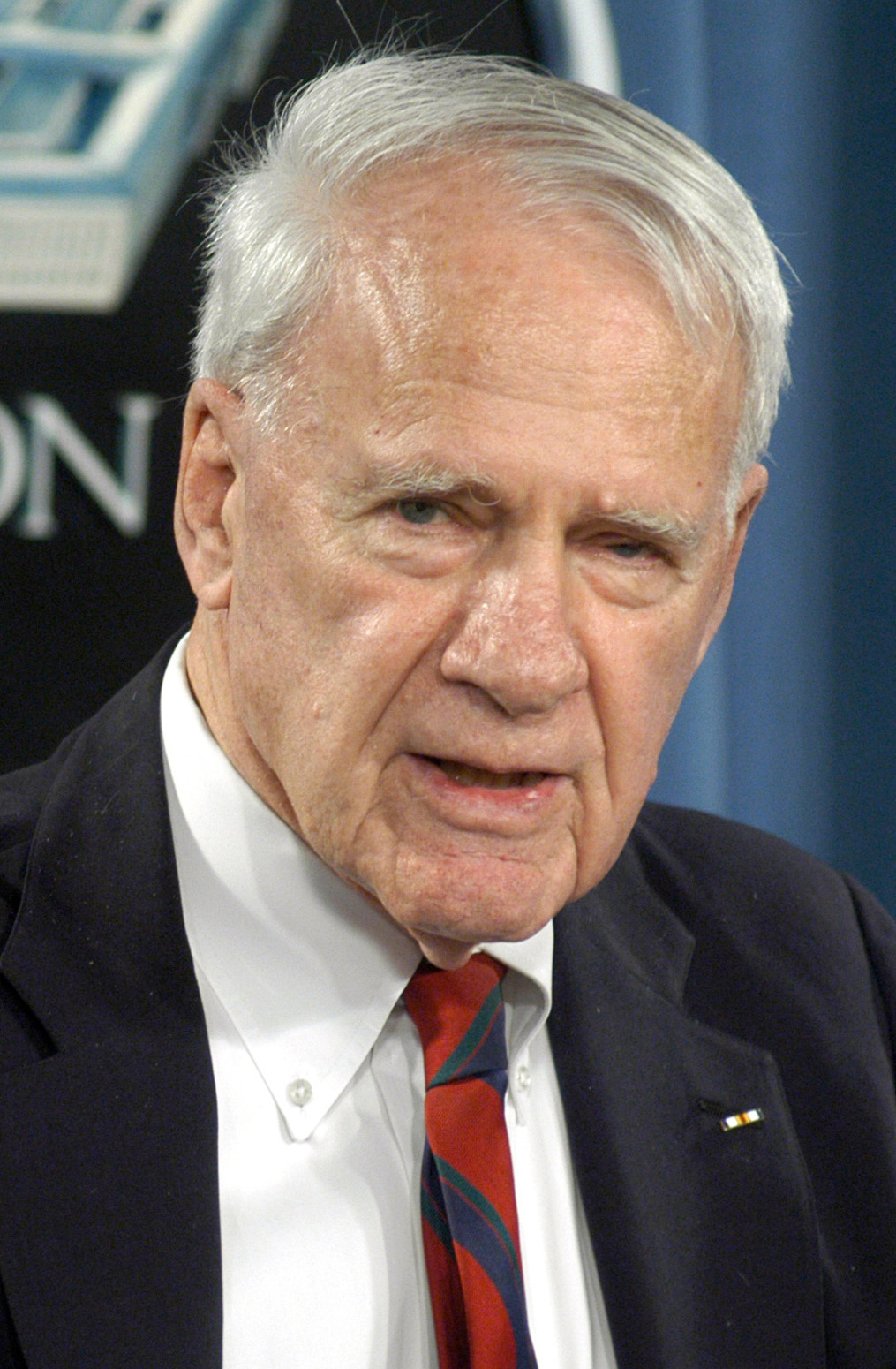
Schlesinger at the Pentagon in 2004, as Chairman of the Independent Panel to Review Department of Defense Detention Operations

After leaving the Energy Department, Schlesinger resumed his writing and speaking career, including the 1994 lecture at the Waldo Family Lecture on International Relations at Old Dominion University. He was employed as a senior adviser to Lehman Brothers, Kuhn, Loeb Inc., of New York City. He advised Congressman and presidential candidate Richard Gephardt in 1988.

In 1995, he was the Chairman of the National Academy of Public Administration (NAPA). They wrote a report in conjunction with the National Research Council called "The Global Positioning System: Charting the Future" The report advocated for the opening GPS up to the private sector.

On February 8, 2002, he appeared at a hearing before the Senate Governmental Affairs Committee in support of the creation of a commission to investigate the 9/11 attacks.

On June 11, 2002, he was appointed by U.S. President George W. Bush to the Homeland Security Advisory Council. He also served as a consultant to the United States Department of Defense, and was a member of the Defense Policy Board.

In 2004, he served as chairman to the Independent Panel to Review DoD Detention Operations.

On January 5, 2006, he participated in a meeting at the White House of former Secretaries of Defense and State to discuss United States foreign policy with Bush administration officials. On January 31, 2006, he was appointed by the Secretary of State to be a member of the Arms Control and Nonproliferation Advisory Board. On May 2, 2006, he was named to be a co-chairman of a Defense Science Board study on DOD Energy Strategy. He was an honorary chairman of The OSS Society. He was also a Bilderberg Group attendee in 2008.

In 2007, NASA Administrator Michael Griffin appointed Schlesinger to be the Chairman of the National Space-based Positioning, Navigation, and Timing (PNT) Advisory Board. The "PNT Board" is composed of recognized Global Positioning System (GPS) experts from outside the U.S. government that advise the Deputy Secretary level PNT Executive Committee in their oversight management of the GPS constellation and its governmental augmentations.

On June 5, 2008, Defense Secretary Robert Gates appointed Schlesinger to head a task force to ensure the "highest levels" of control over nuclear weapons. The purpose of the review was to prevent a repeat of recent incidents where control was lost over components of nuclear weapons, and even over nuclear weapons themselves.

Schlesinger was chairman of the Board of Trustees of The MITRE Corporation, having served on it from 1985 until his death in 2014; on the advisory board of The National Interest; a Director of BNFL, Inc., Peabody Energy, Sandia Corporation, Seven Seas Petroleum Company, chairman of the executive committee of The Nixon Center. He was also on the advisory board of GeoSynFuels, LLC. Schlesinger penned a number of opinion pieces on global warming, expressing a strongly skeptical position.

=== Peak oil ===
Schlesinger raised awareness of the peak oil issue and supports facing it. In the keynote speech at a 2007 conference hosted by the Association for the Study of Peak Oil and Gas in Cork, Schlesinger said that oil industry executives now privately concede that the world faces an imminent oil production peak. In his 2010 ASPO-USA keynote speech, Schlesinger observed that the Peak Oil debate was over. He warned of political inaction as a major hindrance, like those in Pompeii before the eruption of Mount Vesuvius.

On June 5, 2008, U.S. Secretary of Defense Robert Gates announced that he had asked Schlesinger to lead a senior-level task force to recommend improvements in the stewardship and operation of nuclear weapons, delivery vehicles and sensitive components by the US DoD following the 2007 United States Air Force nuclear weapons incident. Members of the task force came from the Defense Policy Board and the Defense Science Board.

== Personal life ==
In 1954, Schlesinger married Rachel Line Mellinger (1930–1995); they had eight children: Cora (1955), Charles (1956), Ann (1958), William (1959), Emily (1961), Thomas (1964), Clara (1966) and James (1970).

Though raised in a Jewish household, Schlesinger converted to Lutheranism as an adult.

Rachel Schlesinger was an accomplished violinist and board member of the Arlington Symphony. In the early 1990s, she was a leader in the fundraising effort to create a premier performing arts center on the Virginia side of the Potomac River. She died from cancer before seeing the center's completion. After her death, Dr. Schlesinger donated $1 million to have the center named in his wife's memory. The Rachel M. Schlesinger Concert Hall and Arts Center at Northern Virginia Community College, Alexandria Campus opened in September, 2001. It is an up-to-date building that features the Mary Baker Collier Theatre, the Margaret W. and Joseph L. Fisher Art Gallery, the Wachovia Forum and Seminar Room spaces. Clients of the Schlesinger Center include the Alexandria Symphony, the United States Marine Band, "The President's Own", and the U.S. Marine Chamber Orchestra, the United States Army Band, "Pershing's Own", and the U.S. Army Strings, the United States Navy Band, the New Dominion Chorale, the American Balalaika Symphony, Festivals of Music, various ethnic groups and many others.

Schlesinger worked consistently with distinction long after his government and academic experiences, serving on numerous governmental advisory boards until only weeks before his death at the age of 85. He was buried at Ferncliff Cemetery in Springfield, Ohio.

== Selected publications ==
- Schlesinger, James R. America at Century's End. New York: Columbia University Press, 1989. ISBN 0-231-06922-7 OCLC 19268030
- Schlesinger, James R. American Security and Energy Policy. Manhattan, Kan: Kansas State University, 1980. OCLC 6699572
- Schlesinger, James R. Defense Planning and Budgeting: The Issue of Centralized Control. Washington: Industrial College of the Armed Forces, 1968. OCLC 3677
- Schlesinger, James R. The Political Economy of National Security; A Study of the Economic Aspects of the Contemporary Power Struggle. New York: Praeger, 1960. OCLC 1473931

== In popular culture ==
Schlesinger is referred to in the book Peril by Bob Woodward and Robert Costa concerning actions taken by Mark Milley, Chairman of the Joint Chiefs of Staff under Presidents Trump and Biden. According to the news outlet Slate, in 1974 "Schlesinger told Brown," then Chairman of the Joint Chiefs of Staff, "to call him if he received any unusual orders from Nixon. Brown then told all the four-star officers in charge of the various military commands (including Strategic Air Command, which then had control of nuclear weapons) that they were not to carry out any 'execute orders' from the president unless Brown and Schlesinger first verified the orders." Senator Chuck Grassley recently called these actions "extralegal". According to Grassley, "'when President Nixon faced a crisis over impeachment and resignation, Secretary of Defense Schlesinger feared he might order an unprovoked nuclear strike,' he continued. 'So he reportedly took extralegal steps to prevent it.'" Both author Fred Kaplan and Grassley distinguish the actions of Schlesinger as Secretary of Defense, from the actions of Mark Milley as the Chairman of the Joint Chiefs of Staff, with Grassley saying: "Pulling a Milley is a very different kettle of fish. A four-star general can't 'pull a Schlesinger'. Schlesinger was at the top of the chain of command, just below the President. He kept the President's constitutional command [sic] authority firmly in civilian hands. Milley allegedly placed military hands—his hands—on controls that belong exclusively to the President."

Government offices
Preceded by Glenn Seaborg	Chair of the Atomic Energy Commission; 1971–1973	Succeeded by Dixy Lee Ray
Preceded by Richard Helms	Director of Central Intelligence; 1973	Succeeded by Vernon A. Walters; Acting
Political offices
Preceded by Elliot Richardson	United States Secretary of Defense; 1973–1975	Succeeded by Donald Rumsfeld
Preceded by John F. O'Leary as Administrator of the Federal Energy Administration	United States Secretary of Energy; 1977–1979	Succeeded by Charles Duncan
Preceded by Robert W. Fri; Acting as Administrator of the Energy Research and Development Administration	United States Secretary of Energy; 1977–1979	Succeeded by Charles Duncan
