= Demetrios Papademetriou =

Immigration scholar and advisor (1946–2022)

Demetrios G. Papademetriou (February 18, 1946 – January 26, 2022) was an American immigration scholar and advisor. He cofounded the Migration Policy Institute in 2001.
