= Douglas M. Costle =

American lawyer

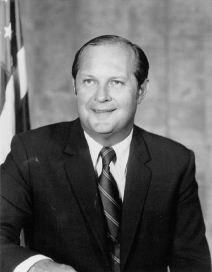

3rd Administrator of the Environmental Protection Agency
- In office March 7, 1977 – January 20, 1981
- President: Jimmy Carter
- Deputy: Barbara Blum
- Preceded by: Russell E. Train
- Succeeded by: Anne Gorsuch Burford

Personal details
- Born: Douglas Michael Costle; July 27, 1939 Long Beach, California, U.S.
- Died: January 13, 2019 (aged 79) McLean, Virginia, U.S.
- Party: Democratic
- Spouse: Elizabeth Costle
- Children: 2
- Education: Harvard University (BA); University of Chicago (JD)

Douglas Michael Costle (July 27, 1939 – January 13, 2019) was one of the architects of the United States Environmental Protection Agency (EPA), and he subsequently served President Jimmy Carter as EPA Administrator from 1977 to 1981.

== Early life and education ==
Costle was born on July 27, 1939, in Long Beach, California, but he grew up in the Pacific Northwest. His early experiences there, including fishing, shaped his awareness of the need for environmental protections.

Costle received a B.A. from Harvard University in 1961, and a J.D. from the University of Chicago Law School in 1964. He became a member of the bar in Washington, D.C., and in California. Costle also served in the United States Army Reserve, working in military intelligence.

Costle was married to wife Elizabeth and the couple have two children.

== Early career ==
During the summer of 1963, Costle worked with the U.S. Department of Justice and the FBI in Mississippi, photographing public records and interviewing witnesses in the early legal actions against the literacy tests used to disenfranchise blacks in the American South.

From 1964 to 1965, Costle was a trial attorney for the Justice Department's Civil Rights Division.

From 1965 to 1967, he was an attorney for the Economic Development Administration, U.S. Department of Commerce. In 1967, he was associate attorney for the law firm of Kelso, Cotton, Seligman and Ray in San Francisco, and from 1968 to 1969 was a senior associate at the San Francisco urban planning firm Marshall, Kaplan, Gans and Kahn.

Prior to the creation of the EPA in 1970, Costle headed the study which recommended its creation when he served as Senior Staff Associate, Environmental and Natural Resources, for the President's Advisory Council on Executive Organization.

In 1971, Costle was a Fellow of the Woodrow Wilson International Center for Scholars. From 1972 to 1975 he was Deputy Commissioner, then Commissioner, of the Connecticut Department of Environmental Protection. During 1975 he was also a consultant to EPA on land use policies. From 1975 to 1977, he was Assistant Director for Natural Resources and Commerce at the Congressional Budget Office.

== Administrator of the Environmental Protection Agency ==
In 1977, U.S. President Jimmy Carter appointed Costle as Administrator of the Environmental Protection Agency, a position in which he served until 1981. As EPA administrator, Costle chaired the U.S. Regulatory Council and was President Carter's representative to NATO's Committee on the Challenges to a Modern Society and the United States chair of the U.S./U.S.S.R. Joint Committee on Cooperation in the Field of Environmental Protection. He also served as the chair of the U.S./People's Republic of China Environmental Protection Protocol.

== Subsequent career ==
Costle served as dean of the Vermont Law School from 1987 to 1991. With Vermont Governor Madeleine Kunin and George Hamilton, he helped to found the Institute for Sustainable Communities in 1991, a non-profit organization which builds environmental, economic and social infrastructure in existing and emerging democracies around the world.

Costle vied for Vermont's Democratic Party nomination to the United States Senate in 1994, losing in a primary to Jan Backus.

== Death ==
Costle died on January 13, 2019, at his home in McLean, Virginia, of complications from a stroke. He was 79-years-old.

Political offices
Preceded by Russell Train	Administrator of the Environmental Protection Agency; 1977–1981	Succeeded by Anne Burford
