= Robert Seamans =

American academic and civil servant

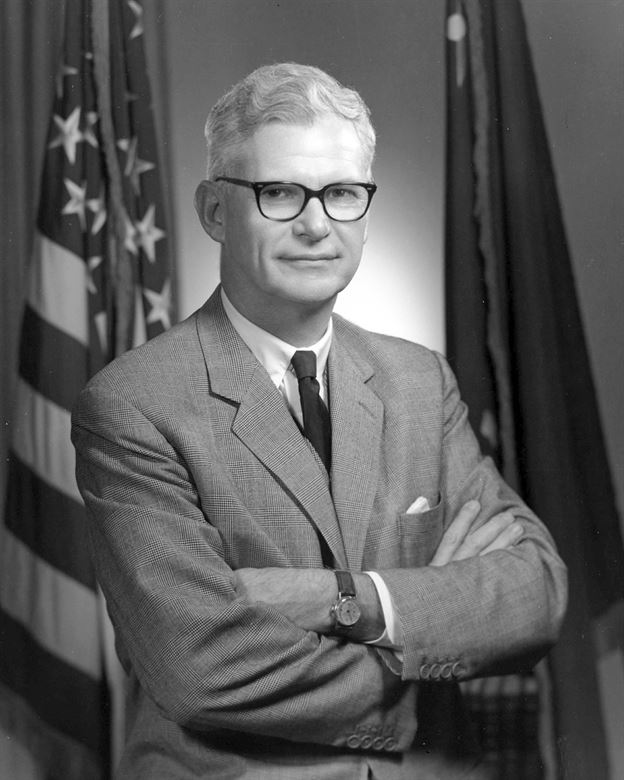

Administrator of the Energy Research and Development Administration
- In office December 30, 1974 – January 20, 1977
- President: Gerald Ford
- Preceded by: Dixy Ray (Chair of the Atomic Energy Commission)
- Succeeded by: Robert W. Fri (acting)

9th United States Secretary of the Air Force
- In office February 15, 1969 – May 15, 1973
- President: Richard Nixon
- Preceded by: Harold Brown
- Succeeded by: John L. McLucas

2nd Deputy Administrator of the National Aeronautics and Space Administration
- In office December 21, 1965 – January 5, 1968
- President: Lyndon B. Johnson
- Preceded by: Hugh Latimer Dryden
- Succeeded by: Thomas O. Paine

Personal details
- Born: Robert Channing Seamans Jr. October 30, 1918 Salem, Massachusetts, U.S.
- Died: June 28, 2008 (aged 89) Beverly, Massachusetts, U.S.
- Party: Republican
- Spouse: Eugenia Merrill
- Children: 5
- Education: Harvard University (BS); Massachusetts Institute of Technology (MS, ScD)
- Scientific career
- Fields: Aeronautical Engineering
- Thesis: Comparison of Automatic Tracking Systems for Interceptor Aircraft (1951)
- Doctoral advisor: Charles Stark Draper

Robert Channing Seamans Jr. (October 30, 1918 – June 28, 2008) was an MIT professor who served as NASA deputy administrator and 9th United States secretary of the Air Force.

== Birth and education ==
He was born in Salem, Massachusetts, to Pauline and Robert Channing Seamans. His great-great-grandfather was Otis Tufts. Seamans attended Lenox School, in Lenox, Massachusetts; earned a Bachelor of Science degree in engineering from Harvard University in 1939 or 1940; a Master of Science degree in aeronautics at the Massachusetts Institute of Technology (MIT) in 1942; and a Doctor of Science degree in instrumentation from MIT in 1951. Seamans also received the following honorary degrees: Doctor of Science from Rollins College (1962) and from New York University (1967); Doctor of Engineering from the Norwich Academy (1971), from the University of Notre Dame (1974), and from Rensselaer Polytechnic Institute (RPI) in 1974.

== Early career ==
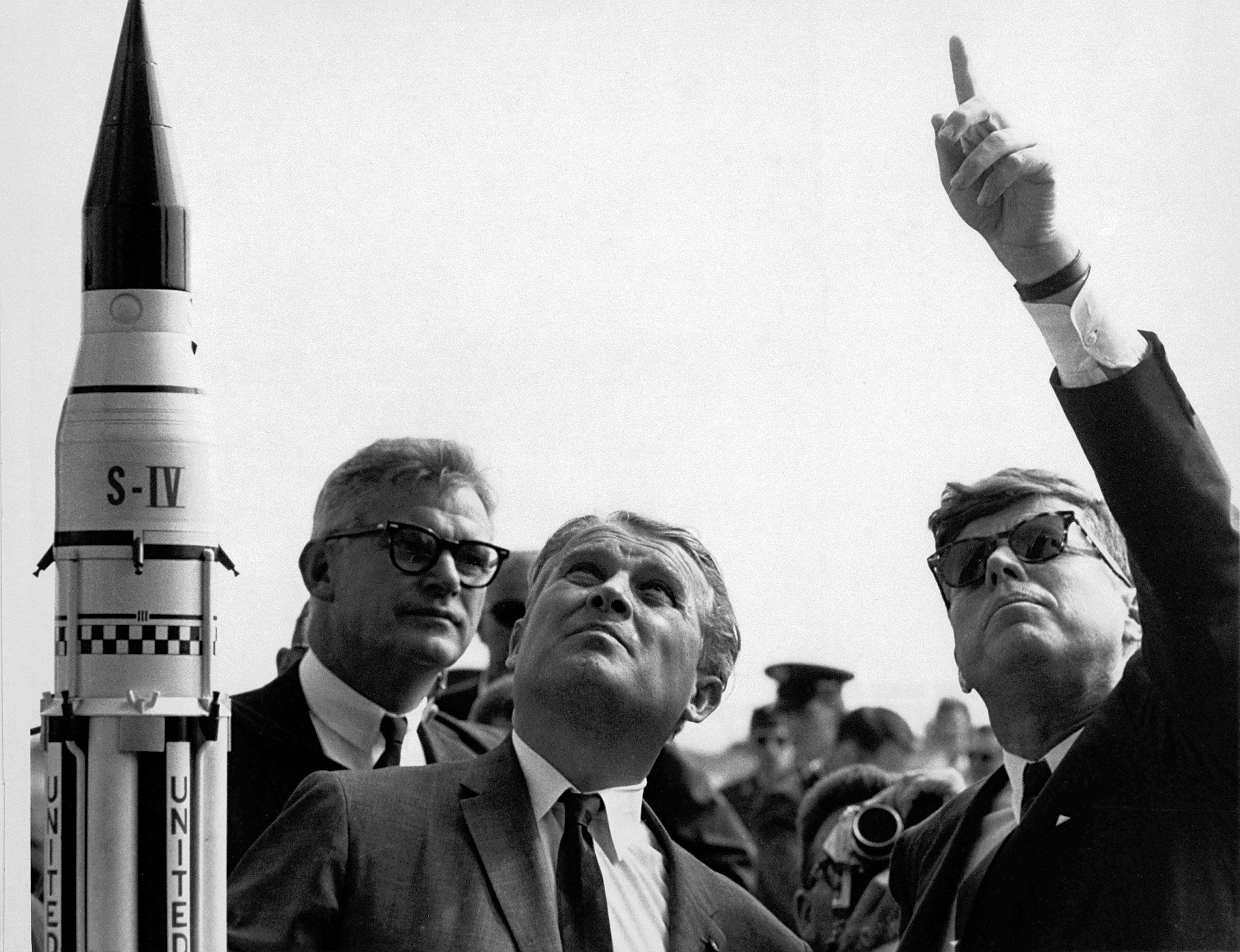
Seamans with Wernher von Braun and President Kennedy at Cape Canaveral 1963.

From 1941 to 1955 he held teaching and project positions at MIT during which time he worked on aeronautical problems, including instrumentation and control of airplanes and missiles. Positions that he held at MIT included: Instructor (1941–1945), Assistant Professor (1945–1950), and Associate Professor (1950–1955), Department of Aeronautical Engineering; Project Engineer, Instrumentation Laboratory; Chief Engineer, Project Meteor; and Director, Flight Control Laboratory.

Seamans joined the Radio Corporation of America (RCA) in 1955 as Manager of the Airborne Systems Laboratory and Chief Systems Engineer of the Airborne Systems Department. In 1958, he became Chief Engineer of the Missile Electronics and Controls Division at RCA in Burlington, Massachusetts.

== NACA and NASA career ==
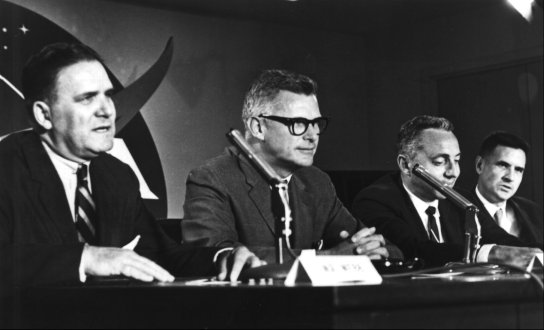
Seamans during NASA post-flight conference on the Gemini XII mission at Marshall Space Flight Center in 1966.

From 1948 to 1958, Seamans also served on technical committees of NASA's predecessor organization, the National Advisory Committee for Aeronautics. He served as a consultant to the Scientific Advisory Board of the United States Air Force from 1957 to 1959, as a Member of the Board from 1959 to 1962, and as an Associate Advisor from 1962 to 1967. He was a National Delegate, Advisory Group for Aerospace Research and Development (NATO) from 1966 to 1969.

In 1960, Seamans joined NASA as Associate Administrator. In 1965, he became Deputy Administrator, retaining many of the general management-type responsibilities of the Associate Administrator and also serving as Acting Administrator. During his years at NASA he worked closely with the Department of Defense in research and engineering programs and served as Co-chairman of the Astronautics Coordinating Board. Through these associations, NASA was kept aware of military developments and technical needs of the Department of Defense and Seamans was able to advise that agency of NASA activities which had application to national security.

== Post-NASA career ==
In January 1968 he resigned from NASA to become a visiting professor at MIT and in July 1968 was appointed to the Jerome Clarke Hunsaker professorship, an MIT-endowed visiting professorship in the Department of Aeronautics and Astronautics, named in honor of the founder of the Aeronautical Engineering Department. During this period with MIT, he was also a consultant to the Administrator of NASA.

Seamans was also president of the National Academy of Engineering from May 1973 to December 1974, when he became the first administrator of the new Energy Research and Development Administration. He returned to MIT in 1977, becoming dean of its School of Engineering in 1978. In 1981 he was elected chair of the board of trustees of Aerospace Corp.

== Secretary of the Air Force ==
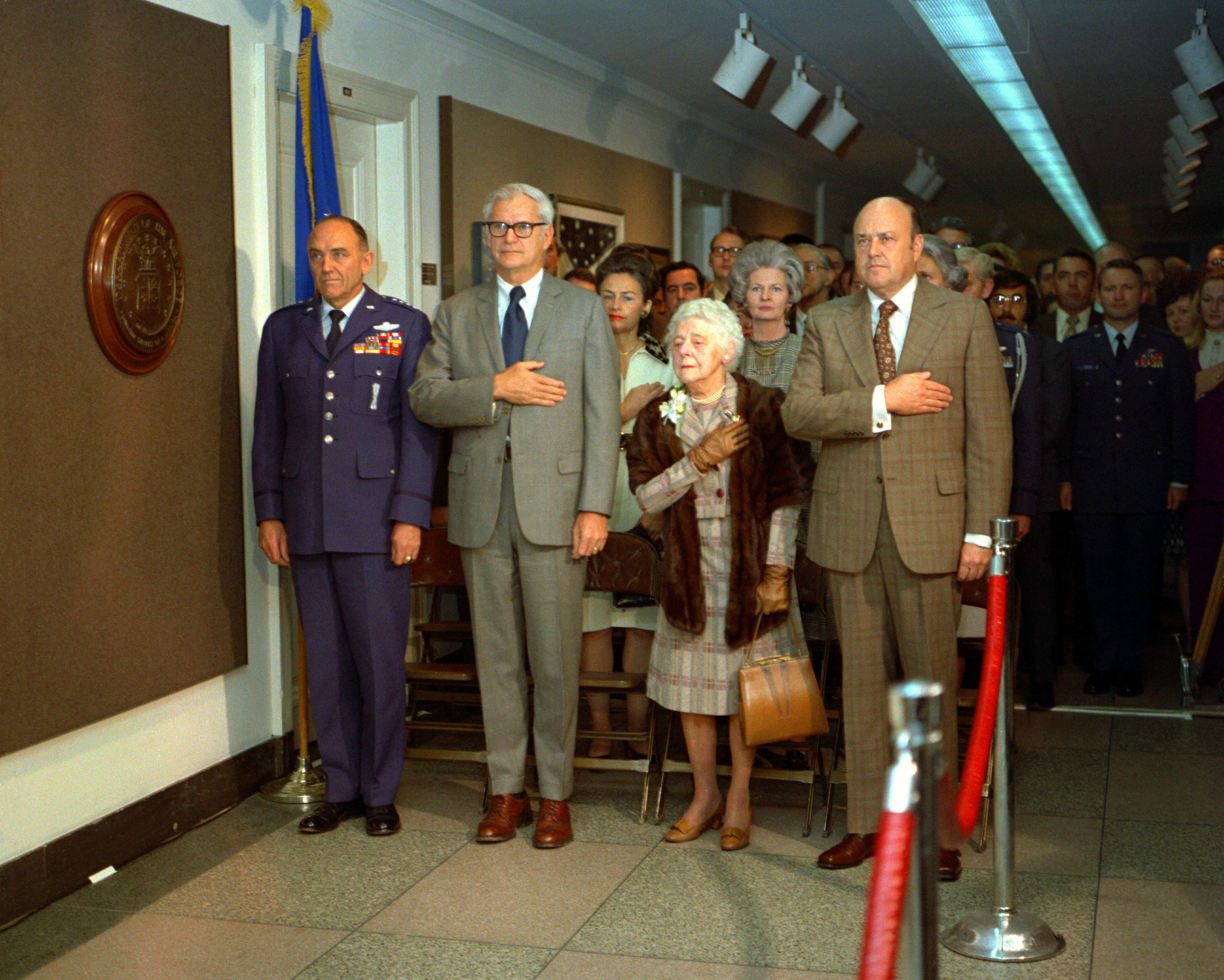
Air Force Secretary Robert C. Seamans, Jr. with Air Force Chief of Staff General John D. Ryan and Secretary of Defense Melvin R. Laird at a ceremony in The Pentagon.

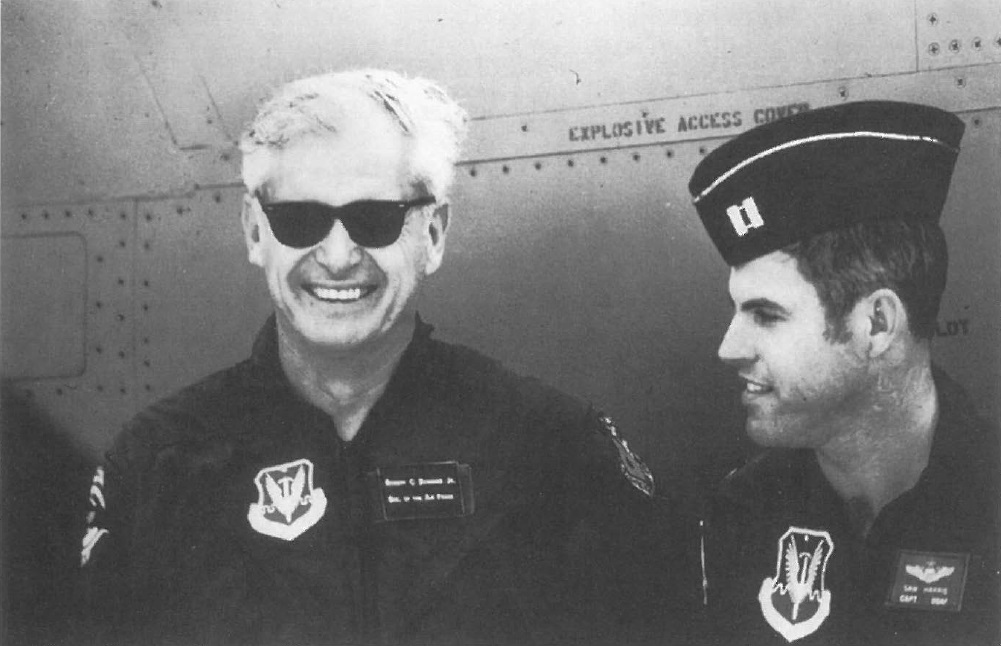
Air Force Secretary Robert C. Seamans, Jr. on a testing flight with General Dynamics F-111 Aardvark.

In 1969, Seamans was appointed by President Richard Nixon to the position of Secretary of the United States Air Force. During his four-year tenure Seamans made several significant and lasting contributions. He recognized that despite funding reductions, the Air Force needed to modernize its aircraft technology in order to prepare against unknowable future threats. To meet the need for financially efficient modernization of the fleet, Seamans implemented an innovative program utilizing technological research to provide a range of development options. In this way the Air Force would have multiple options from which to choose to meet specific threats of an unpredictable future. Prototypes designed in this program continued to be utilized into the 1980s.

Seamans originally accepted his appointment for two years, however he offered to renew his commitment for another two years under the condition that the United States terminate military activity in Southeast Asia. Seamans retired from his duties as Secretary of the Air Force on May 15, 1973 and was replaced by John L. McLucas.

== Personal life ==
Seamans married Eugenia Merrill on June 13, 1942, in Beverly Farms, Massachusetts. He had three sons (Robert III, Joseph and Daniel) and two daughters (Katharine Padulo and May Baldwin). Seamans also had 11 grandchildren.

He died on June 28, 2008, in Beverly, Massachusetts, at age 89.

== Legacy and honors ==
- In 1964, Seamans was elected to the American Academy of Arts and Sciences.
- In 1975, Seamans was elected to the American Philosophical Society.
- In 2001, the Sea Education Association named their new sailing research ship SSV Robert C. Seamans, in honor of their former Chairman and Trustee.
- In the 1998 HBO miniseries From the Earth to the Moon, Seamans was played by Dann Florek.
- His last TV interview is featured in the Discovery Science Channel Series Moon Machines episode on the Apollo guidance and navigation system, recorded in the autumn of 2007 and first broadcast shortly after his death in the summer of 2008.

Political offices
Preceded by Harold Brown	United States Secretary of the Air Force; 1969–1973	Succeeded by John L. McLucas
Preceded by Dixy Ray as Chair of the Atomic Energy Commission	Administrator of the Energy Research and Development Administration; 1974–1977	Succeeded by Robert W. Fri; Acting
