= T. J. Bonner =

American border patrol agent

T.J. Bonner was the president of the National Border Patrol Council (NBPC) until March 8, 2011 when the delegates attending the NBPC convention elected a new president. This organization is a union that represents over 16,000 United States Border Patrol agents.

They will come. I don't care what fences or how many Border Patrol Agents you put there, they will come!

— T.J. Bonner, Guest Lecture at the University of California, San Diego, for Professor Wayne Cornelius' Politics of Immigration Course, November 1, 2006
