= Kathleen Newland =

Kathleen Newland is co-founder and Board of Trustees member of the Migration Policy Institute (MPI), a think tank located in the United States and focused on the study of migration policy worldwide (but with particular focus on the United States and Europe). She is also the director of the Migration, Migrants, and Development Program there and also leads the refugee protection work at MPI.

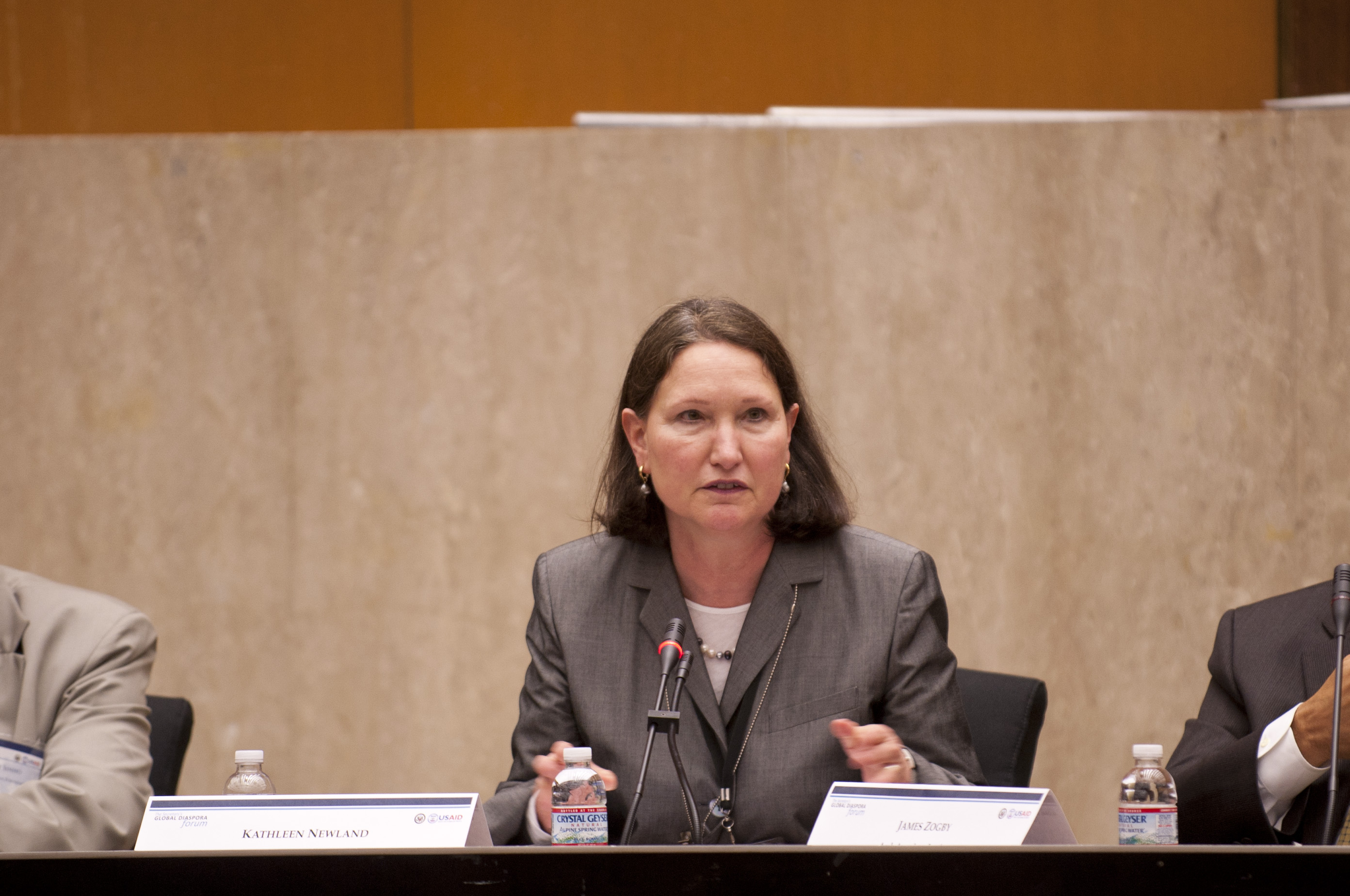

== Professional life ==
Newland is a graduate of Harvard University and the Woodrow Wilson School at Princeton University. She began her career in 1974 at the Worldwatch Institute. She later worked at the United Nations University in Tokyo, Japan, the London School of Economics, and the United Nations High Commission for Refugees (UNHCR). In 1994, she joined the Carnegie Endowment for International Peace, where she was a Senior Associate and then Co-Director of the International Migration Policy Program.

Newland co-founded the Migration Policy Institute in July 2001.

Newland was also the Founding Director of the International diaspora Engagement Alliance (IdEA) during its incubation phase at MPI from 2011 to 2013.

Newland also serves on the board of the Stimson Center.
