= Energy Research and Development Administration =

United States government organization

- ERDA
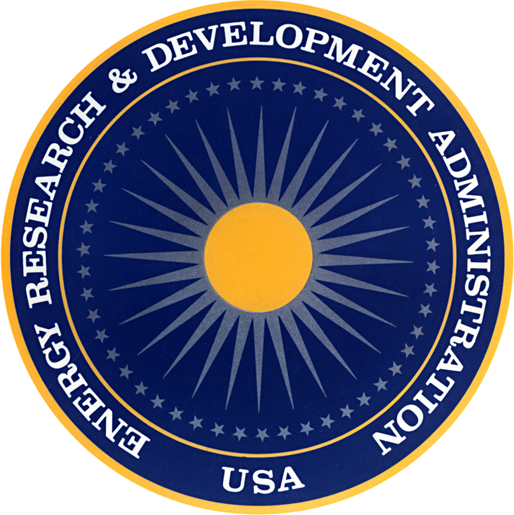

Agency overview
- Formed: January 19, 1975
- Preceding agency: United States Atomic Energy Commission
- Dissolved: October 1, 1977
- Superseding agency: United States Department of Energy
- Jurisdiction: Federal government of the United States

The United States Energy Research and Development Administration (ERDA) was a United States government organization formed from the split of the Atomic Energy Commission (AEC) in 1975. It assumed the functions of the AEC not assumed by the Nuclear Regulatory Commission.

The agency was created as part of the Energy Reorganization Act of 1974, which was passed on October 11, 1974, in the wake of the 1973 oil crisis. The act split the Atomic Energy Commission into two new agencies: the Nuclear Regulatory Commission would regulate the commercial nuclear power industry, while the ERDA would manage the energy research and development, nuclear weapons, and naval reactors programs.

The Energy Research and Development Administration was established on January 19, 1975. The first administrator was Robert Seamans, followed by Robert W. Fri.

In 1977, ERDA was merged with the Federal Energy Administration to form the United States Department of Energy.

== Administrators ==
Denotes acting capacity.

| Name | Start | End | President |
|---|---|---|---|
| Robert Seamans | December 30, 1974 | January 20, 1977 | Gerald Ford (1974–1977) |
| Robert Fri; Acting | January 20, 1977 | September 30, 1977 | Jimmy Carter (1977–1981) |
