= Russell E. Train =

Administrator of the Environmental Protection Agency (1920–2012)

Russell Train
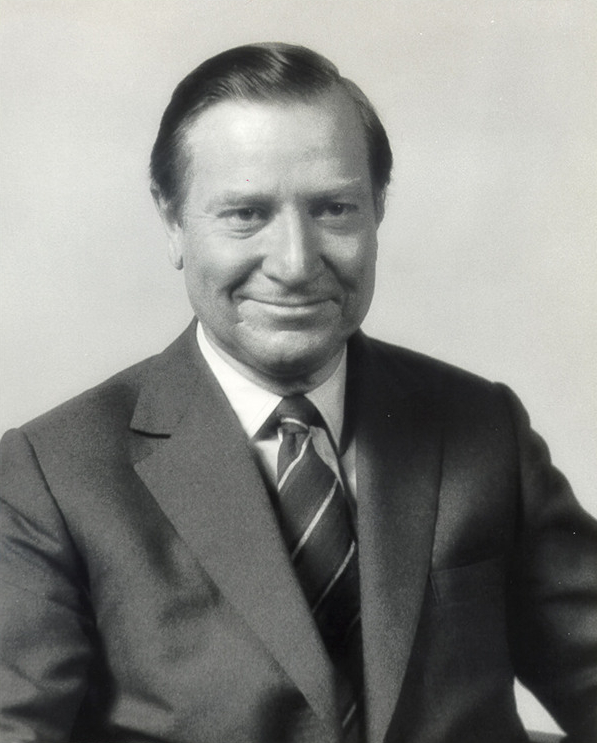

2nd Administrator of the Environmental Protection Agency
- In office September 12, 1973 – January 20, 1977
- President: Richard Nixon; Gerald Ford
- Deputy: John R. Quarles Jr.
- Preceded by: William Ruckelshaus
- Succeeded by: Douglas M. Costle

Chair of the Council on Environmental Quality
- In office January 1, 1970 – September 12, 1973
- President: Richard Nixon
- Preceded by: Position established
- Succeeded by: Russell W. Peterson

Personal details
- Born: Russell Errol Train; June 4, 1920 Jamestown, Rhode Island, U.S.
- Died: September 17, 2012 (aged 92) Bozman, Maryland, U.S.
- Party: Republican
- Spouse: Aileen Bowdoin Travers
- Parent: Charles R. Train (father)
- Relatives: Charles J. Train (grandfather); Charles R. Train (great-grandfather)
- Education: Princeton University (AB); Columbia University (LLB)

Russell Errol Train (June 4, 1920 – September 17, 2012) was the second administrator of the Environmental Protection Agency (EPA), from September 1973 to January 1977 and the founder chairman emeritus of World Wildlife Fund (WWF). As the second head of the EPA under presidents Richard Nixon and Gerald Ford, Train helped place the issue of the environment on the presidential and national agenda in the late 1960s and early 1970s, a key period in the environmental movement. He was a conservative who reached out to the business community and Republicans. He promulgated the idea that as the economy of the nation was growing quickly, public as well as private projects should consider and evaluate the environmental impacts of their actions.

== Early life, education, and military service ==
Train was born on June 4, 1920, in Jamestown, Rhode Island, but grew up in Washington, D.C. His father was an officer in the United States Navy who was frequently away on assignment. The youngest of the three sons of Rear Admiral Charles Russell Train and the former Errol Cuthbert. His paternal grandfather was Rear Admiral Charles J. Train, and his great-grandfather Charles R. Train had been a U.S. Congressman and Massachusetts Attorney General. An ancestor, John Trayne, had emigrated from Scotland to the Massachusetts Bay Colony in 1635.

He was trained in the ways of Washington from an early age. His father had an office at the White House, where he served as President Herbert Hoover's Naval aide. In 1932, Mrs. Hoover invited Mr. Train and his older brothers, Cuthbert and Middleton, to spend the night at the White House, where they slept in the Andrew Jackson bedroom and breakfasted with the president and Mrs. Hoover on the portico overlooking the Ellipse and the Washington Monument.

"I think what made the greatest impression on me," he wrote years later, "were the tall glasses of fresh California orange juice. I had never seen anything like those large glassfuls before."

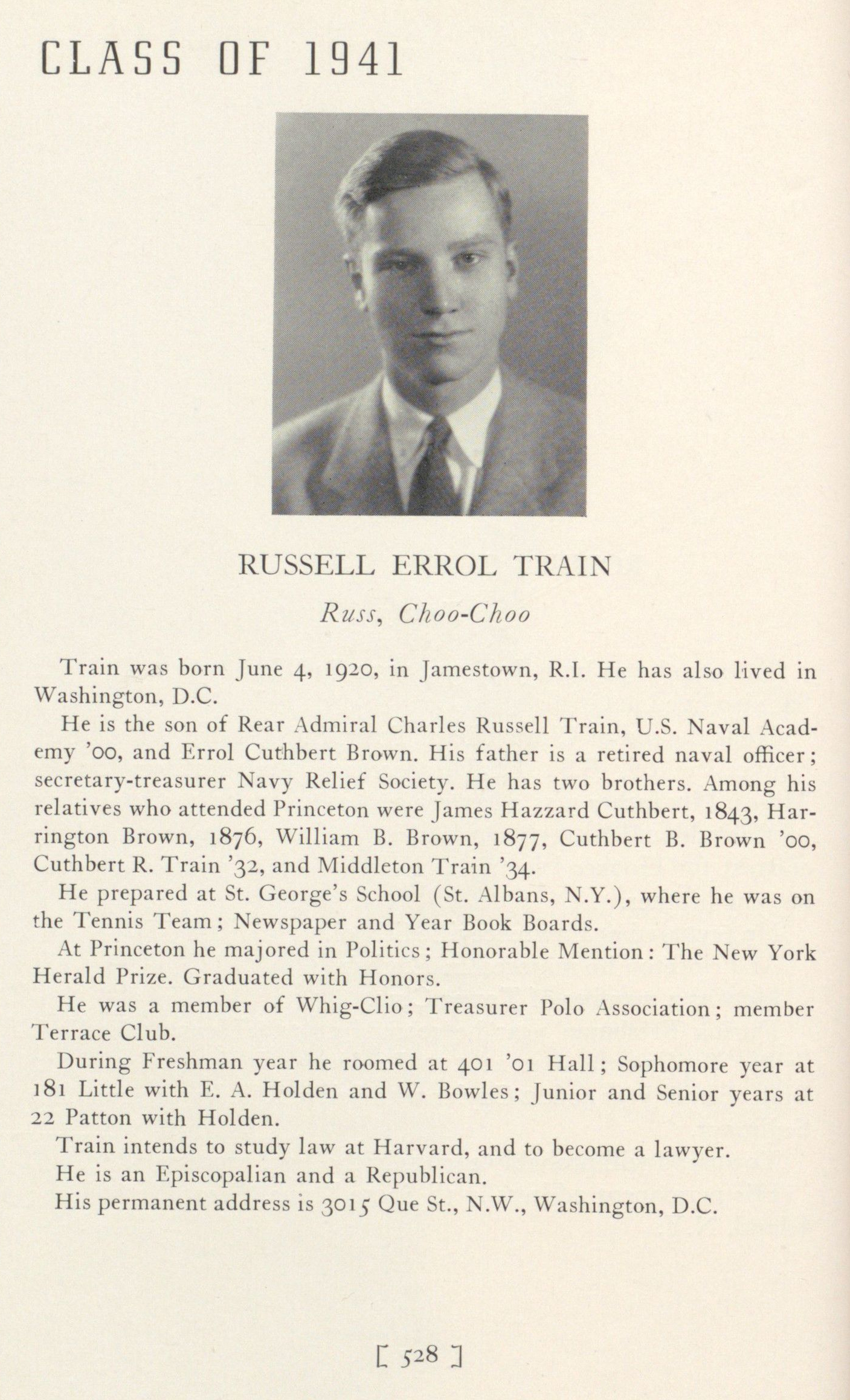
Train in the Princeton University yearbook, 1941

Young Russell attended the Potomac School and then the St. Albans School and graduated in 1937. Train then studied at Princeton University, from where he graduated with an A.B. in politics in 1941 after completing a 112-page long senior thesis titled "The United States versus Japan: A Study of Sea Power in the Atlantic." While at Princeton, he was in the United States Army ROTC program and upon graduation entered the Army as an officer. Train remained in the Army for four years during World War II, stationed both home and overseas and ending up on Okinawa. He attained the rank of major, before being discharged in 1946.

Over the following two years Train attended Columbia University Law School, where he took an accelerated schedule and graduated with an LLB in 1948.

== Early career ==
Early in his career, Train served from 1949 to 1956 as Attorney, Chief Counsel, and Minority Advisor on various Congressional committees and from 1956 to 1957 as Assistant to the Secretary and Head of the Legal Advisory Staff for the U.S. Treasury Department.

In 1954, Train married the former Aileen Bowdoin Travers; they became the parents to four children – Nancy, Emily, Bowdoin and Errol.

He was a judge for the U.S. Tax Court from 1957 to 1965, one of several appointments which went against a previously observed Senate Resolution prohibiting the appointment to that body of persons recently employed by the Treasury Department.

== World Wildlife Fund ==
In 1959, Train founded the Wildlife Leadership Foundation in hopes of establishing effective wildlife parks and reserves. In 1961, he founded the African Wildlife Foundation (AWF) to aid Africans in developing capacity to manage their own wildlife resources. He was chairman of the AWF from 1961 to 1969. He also helped establish the College of African Wildlife Management at Mweka (near Moshi), Tanzania.

When the World Wildlife Fund (U.S.) was formed in Washington, D.C., on December 1, 1961, Russell Train became its first ever Vice-President; in later years he was named Chair Emeritus of the WWF. He was President of The Conservation Foundation from 1965 to 1969. In this role, Train helped to bring the environment to the American public's consciousness and lobbied for a high-level policy group at the highest levels of government.

In 1966, Train became a member of the National Water Commission, charged by Congress with reviewing national water policies.

In 1968, Train was selected to serve as Chairman, Task Force on Environment for U.S. President-elect Richard M. Nixon. His selection, and the creation of the task force, signals the growing acceptance by the incoming administration of the "environment" as a public policy concept.

Train served as Under Secretary of the Department of the Interior from 1969 to 1970. Between 1970 and 1973 he was Chairman of the newly formed Council on Environmental Quality (CEQ).

== EPA Administrator ==
During his time as Administrator of the Environmental Protection Agency, Train led during the approval of the catalytic converter to achieve Clean Air Act automobile emission reductions; and the implementation of the Toxic Substances Control Act (TSCA) and the National Pollutant Discharge Elimination System (NPDES).

As head of the EPA under Presidents Nixon and Ford, Train is generally credited with helping to place the issue of the environment on the presidential and national agenda in the late 1960s and early 1970s, a key period in the environmental movement.

Train opened a dialog on global environmental issues with Soviet Ambassador Anatoly Dobrynin, marking the birth of modern American environmental diplomacy Nixon pursued environmental diplomacy to garner domestic political support.

== Return to World Wildlife Fund ==
After leaving EPA he served as president of the World Wildlife Fund-U.S. from 1978 to 1985 and as its chairman from 1985 to 1994. Under his guidance, World Wildlife Fund-US expanded its focus not only on species-related conservation projects, but also on protecting habitat by establishing national parks and nature reserves. It also developed innovative financial mechanisms, including the concept of using Third World debt reduction to protect the global environment. Through these debt-for-nature swaps, WWF started to convert portions of national debts into funding for conservation, beginning in the mid-eighties.

Through Train's efforts, in 1983 the WWF-administered J. Paul Getty Wildlife Conservation Prize was presented to awardees in the White House Rose Garden by President Ronald Reagan. President Reagan called the Getty Prize "the Nobel Prize for Conservation." Begun in 1974, the Getty Prize originally honored outstanding contributions to wildlife conservation and now focuses on the education of future conservationists.

In 1985, Train became chairman of the board of directors of World Wildlife Fund and The Conservation Foundation and served as chairman until 1994. In this same year, the Conservation Foundation formally affiliated with WWF. Though the organizations shared the same board of directors as well as some staff, they remained separate legal entities until their merger in 1990.

During 1988 he also worked as co-chairman of Conservationists for Bush, making reference to George H. W. Bush, and from 1990 to 1992 as chairman of the National Commission on the Environment.

In September 1994, Train was elected WWF chairman emeritus. That same year, WWF launched the Russell E. Train Education for Nature (EFN) Program to help build capacity for conservation in Africa, Asia, and Latin America by supporting academic and mid-career training. To date, EFN has awarded over 1,200 scholarships and training grants totaling 11.3 million since its establishment.

Train was named chairman of WWF's National Council from 1994 to 2001.

In 2003, Politics, Pollution and Panda: An Environmental Memoir by Russell E. Train was published. A chronicle of his career, the book is also a history of the birth and growth of U.S. national interest in environmental issues.

== Death ==
Train died at his farm in Bozman, Maryland, on September 17, 2012, aged 92.

== Awards and honors ==
In 1975, Train was awarded the Aldo Leopold award from the Wildlife Society.

In 1981, Train was awarded the Public Welfare Medal from the National Academy of Sciences.

In 1991, Train received the Presidential Medal of Freedom in recognition of his work in conservation.

In 2001, Train received the 7th Annual Heinz Award Chairman's Medal, 2001, a prestigious prize honoring individuals who have made extraordinary achievements on issues of importance. Train was recognized as "a tireless advocate for the cause of the environment since 1961… the architect of an environmental agenda without parallel in history in its scope…and as a "truly outstanding example of how a single life can make a difference in the world."

In 2009, a species of gecko, Gekko russelltraini, was named in his honor.

== Collector of books, manuscripts, and artwork ==
Train collected printed books, manuscripts, photographs, maps, artifacts, and artwork on African exploration, big-game hunting, natural history, and wildlife conservation, dating primarily from the nineteenth and twentieth centuries. In 2004, the Russell E. Train Africana Collection was acquired by the Smithsonian Institution Libraries, where it is housed in the Joseph F. Cullman 3rd Library of Natural History in Washington, D.C. The collection includes correspondence, drafts of publications, diaries, account books, ephemera, posters, news-clippings, biographies, memoirs, portraits, and the former personal property of selected explorers, big game hunters, missionaries, pioneers, and naturalists in Africa. The Train Collection is particularly strong in archival materials on the following topics: the search for the source of the Nile and the progress of other exploring expeditions in Africa; the collecting of specimens of African animals, plants, and ethnological materials for zoos and museums (including a significant body of correspondence and photographs from the Smithsonian African Expedition in 1909-1910, led by President Theodore Roosevelt); and the growth of the African wildlife conservation movement. Besides Roosevelt, the major persons represented in the Train Africana Collection include the journalist and explorer Henry Morton Stanley and members of his Emin Pasha Relief Expedition (Thomas Heazle Parke, Robert H. Nelson, James S. Jameson, John Rose Troup, William Bonny, William Grant Stairs, Edmund Musgrave Barttelot, and Arthur J. M. Jephson); the medical missionary Dr. David Livingstone and his father-in-law Robert Moffat; taxidermist Carl Akeley; zoologist Edmund Heller; hunter Frederick Selous; artist and adventure writer A. Radclyffe Dugmore; explorers Samuel Baker, Thomas Baines, Richard Francis Burton and E.J. Glave; anthropologist Paul du Chaillu; and royal traveler Edward VIII (later the Duke of Windsor).

== See also ==
- Presidency of Richard Nixon#Environmental policy
- Environmental history of the United States

Political offices
New office	Chair of the Council on Environmental Quality; 1970–1973	Succeeded by Russell W. Peterson
Preceded by William D. Ruckelshaus	Administrator of the Environmental Protection Agency; 1973–1977	Succeeded by Douglas M. Costle
