= Jean-François Seznec =

French political scientist

Jean-François Seznec is a political scientist specializing in business and finance in the Middle East. He retired in 2020 and now spends his time managing Hollywood Farm, a fourth-generation family farm in the Broadneck peninsula of Annapolis, Maryland.

Prior to his retirement, he was an adjunct professor at the School of Advanced International Studies (SAIS) at the Johns Hopkins University (2012–2020) and at Georgetown University's McDonough School of Business and Edmund A. Walsh School of Foreign Service (2002–2015); both located in Washington, D.C.. Seznec was previously visiting associate professor at the Center for Contemporary Arab Studies at Georgetown University, where he taught from 2001 to 2012. His teaching and research interests are in the Persian Gulf region with special focus on the political and social variables that influence the economic development of the region. He also focuses on industrialization in the Persian Gulf region, concentrating on financial and oil markets and petrochemical and other energy-based industries. Seznec is also the founder and managing director of the Lafayette Group LLC, a US-based private investment company.

== Education ==
Born and raised in France, Seznec moved to the United States as a teenager to pursue his education. In 1970 he received his Bachelor of Arts with departmental honors from Washington College in Maryland. In 1973 he received a Master of International Affairs (MIA) from the School of International and Public Affairs, Columbia University. He later returned to academics to complete a Master of Arts and Philosophy Doctorate in Political Science from Yale University in 1994. His Ph.D. dissertation was entitled "The Politics of the Financial Markets in Saudi Arabia, Kuwait, and Bahrain."

== Experience ==
Prior to joining Georgetown University, Seznec taught at Columbia University's Middle East Institute in the School of International and Public Affairs, from 1986 to 2006.

Seznec also has 25 years of experience in international banking and finance, of which ten years were spent in the Middle East. He began his banking career at Chase Manhattan Bank, where he spent two years with the Saudi Industrial Development Fund in Riyadh, Saudi Arabia. He then worked for the Saudi European Bank, and during that time spent six years in Bahrain at the bank's offshore unit. Seznec also worked in New York for the Bahrain Middle East Bank.

Throughout his career Seznec has served on various management and director boards. He has been a senior advisor for the Petroleum Finance Company (PFC) in Washington, D.C. From 2000 to 2008 he served on the board of advisers for the Middle East at Human Rights Watch. He is also a member of the Middle East board of advisers for Zurich Insurance Company, and a board member of the Stimson Center and the Oasis Foundation.

== Publications ==
Seznec has written extensively on the politics and economics of the Persian Gulf region. His latest book is an edited volume entitled Industrialization in the Gulf: A Socioeconomic Revolution, published by Routledge in 2010. His first book, published in 1987, is entitled The Financial Markets of the Arabian Gulf, published by Croom Helm in 1987. His second book, The Financial Markets of the Arab Gulf: Power, Politics and Money" was published with Routledge in 2018.

Seznec has also contributed chapters to many academic books and published scholarly articles in numerous trade publications.

Seznec was a contributing author to several publication outlets including Foreign Policy, Jadaliyya, The Daily Star, and the Harvard International Review, and still is a frequent guest and interviewee for numerous media outlets.
