= Barbara Blum =

American businesswoman

Barbara Davis Blum

3rd Deputy Administrator of the United States Environmental Protection Agency
- In office March 7, 1977 – January 20, 1981
- President: Jimmy Carter
- Preceded by: John R. Quarles Jr.
- Succeeded by: John W. Hernandez Jr.

Personal details
- Born: July 6, 1939 (age 86)
- Political party: Democratic

Barbara Davis Blum (born July 6, 1939) is an American businesswoman, public health administrator, and environmental advocate who served as the deputy administrator of the United States Environmental Protection Agency from 1977 to 1981. From 1983 to 1998, she was the president and chief executive of Adams National Bank, the first federally chartered bank to be owned and managed by women. The bank was later renamed Abigail Adams National Bancorp.

== Early life and education ==
Blum was born July 6, 1939, in Hutchinson, Kansas, and attended Florida State University, where she received both a bachelor's degree and master's degree in social work.

== Career ==
Blum was a faculty member at the Pediatric Psychiatry Clinic at the University of Kansas Medical Center. From 1963 to 1964, she served as acting administrator of the Suffolk County Mental Health Clinic in Huntington, New York. In 1964, Blum co-founded the Mid-Suffolk Center for Psychotherapy in Hauppauge, New York, where she held the position of partner and center administrator until 1966.

Blum has held various positions on boards and commissions, including as a member of the Federal Reserve Board's National Consumer Advisory Council, chair of the Georgia Heritage Trust Commission, and vice-chair of the Fulton County Planning Commission. She was also appointed by the Atlanta Chamber of Commerce to Leadership Atlanta from 1974 to 1976.

In 1976, Blum served as a deputy campaign director for the Carter-Mondale Presidential campaign.

During her tenure at the EPA, she established the National Hazardous Waste Enforcement Task Force to coordinate the clean up of toxic waste at so-called superfund sites. She was also part of the EPA's 1978 recall of American Motors Corporation vehicles because of faulty exhaust systems that permit nitrogen oxide to escape into the air. The recall affected 270,000 Hornets, Gremlins, Pacers and Matadors, as well as 40,000 Jeeps and postal delivery trucks.
