= Migration Policy Institute =

American think tank

- Abbreviation: MPI
- Formation: 2001
- Founders: Kathleen Newland and Demetrios G. Papademetriou
- Type: Think tank
- Headquarters: Washington, D.C.
- President: Andrew Selee
- Director of National Center on Immigrant Integration Policy: Margie McHugh
- President of MPI Europe: Demetrios G. Papademetriou
- Parent organization: Carnegie Endowment for International Peace
- Website: www.migrationpolicy.org

The Migration Policy Institute (MPI) is an American non-partisan think tank established in 2001 by Kathleen Newland and Demetrios G. Papademetriou.

== About ==
The Migration Policy Institute was established by Demetrios G. Papademetriou and Kathleen Newland in 2001. The Migration Policy Institute launched MPI Europe in 2011 in Brussels. Andrew Selee is the President of MPI. MPI publishes an online journal, the Migration Information Source, which provides information, thoughts, and analyses of international migration and refugee trends.

MPI organizes an annual Immigration Law and Policy Conference in cooperation with Georgetown University Law Center and the Catholic Legal Immigration Network, Inc.
