= Ozone Transport Commission =

- Key people: Chair: Emma Cimino, Connecticut; Vice-Chair: Richard Jackson, District of Columbia; Treasurer/Secretary: Melanie Loyzim, Maine; Executive Director: Paul Miller
- Website: www.otcair.org
- Formerly called: Northeast Ozone Transport Commission

The Ozone Transport Commission (OTC) is a multi-state organization founded in 1991 and created under the Clean Air Act. It is responsible for advising EPA on air pollution transport issues and for developing and implementing regional solutions to the ground-level ozone problem in the Northeast and Mid-Atlantic regions, collectively called the Ozone Transport Region (OTR). OTC has no regulatory authority, but assists its members in developing model regulations for implementation at the state level. OTC also manages a regional planning organization MANEVU (Mid-Atlantic Northeast Visibility Union), which is charged with regional multi-pollutant air quality planning. In January 2020, operations of OTC were placed under new management by the Northeast States for Coordinated Air Use Management (NESCAUM) and Washington, DC operations were closed.

== Policy Initiatives ==
=== OTC NOX Budget Program ===
In 1994, the OTC adopted a Memorandum of Understanding to adopt a regional emissions trading program for the purpose of reducing emissions of oxides of nitrogen (NOx). This program dubbed the “OTC NOx Budget Program” set a cap for NOx emissions from nine states and the District of Columbia, which was ratcheted down in three phases, starting in 1995, 1999, and 2003, respectively. During this process a larger group of states in the eastern United States and Environmental Protection Agency (EPA) began meeting as the Ozone Transport Assessment Group (OTAG). Their work wound up being adopted by EPA as a trading program NOx trading program that covered a larger geography (22 states plus the District of Columbia) called the "NOx SIP Call" and the third phase of the OTC NOx Budget Program was incorporated into that larger trading program. This early work by the OTC is considered the precursor to the modern emissions trading program (e.g., Cross-State Air Pollution Rule (CSAPR)) which reduced interstate ozone pollution in the Eastern United States

=== OTC Early National Low Emissions Vehicle Program ===
The state of California updated its Low Emissions Vehicle (LEV) Program to require stricter motor vehicle emissions standards beginning in 1999, which was called LEV II. Starting in 1994, the OTC recommended to EPA under Clean Air Act section 184 (c) that it require jurisdictions in the OTR to adopt California's LEV program, which was allowed under Clean Air Act section 177. EPA approved the recommendation but it was ultimately vacated by the U.S. Court of Appeals, District of Columbia Circuit, in a challenge brought by Virginia and three automobile trade associations. An agreement, however, was reached between EPA, the OTC jurisdictions, and the auto manufacturers to introduce new motor vehicle emission standards in the OTC states beginning with the 1999 model year, two years earlier than national, so called Tier 2, standards were to take effect.

=== OTC Model Rules ===
Another area that OTC has adopted policies to reduce ozone precursors (NOx and Volatile Organic Compounds (VOCs) is through model rule development. The OTC has initiated three phases of model rules, each of which culminated signing of a MOU between the member jurisdictions to adopt the model rules as state regulations. The 2001 generation of model rules called for the regulation of Consumer Products, Portable Fueling Containers, Architectural and Maintenance Coatings, Solvent Cleaning, Mobile Equipment Repair and Refinishing, and Additional NOx Controls for Industrial Boilers, Cement Kilns, Stationary Reciprocating Engines, and Stationary Combustion Engines. The 2006 generation of model rules called for the regulation of Diesel Chip Reflash and Adhesive and Sealants and updates to the regulations of Consumer Products and Portable Fueling Container. At the same time the OTC adopted emission limits for Asphalt Paving, Asphalt Production, Cement Kilns, Glass Furnaces, Industrial/Commercial/Institutional (ICI) Boilers, and Regional Fuels to be implemented in conjunction with upwind regions.

== Member jurisdictions ==
- Connecticut
- Delaware
- District of Columbia
- Maine (Only 111 towns and cities in coastal Maine commonly referred to as the "Portland and Midcoast Ozone Areas" are included in the OTR)
- Maryland
- Massachusetts
- New Hampshire
- New Jersey
- New York
- Pennsylvania
- Rhode Island
- Vermont
- Virginia (Only the counties that are in the Washington, D.C. Consolidated Metropolitan Statistical Area are included in the OTR).

== List of past chairs ==
1. Robert Perciasepe, Maryland (May 1991 – June 1992)
2. Dean Marriott, Maine (June 1992 – May 1993)
3. Scott Weiner, New Jersey (May 1993 – January 1994)
4. Arthur Davis, Pennsylvania (January 1994 – November 1994)
5. Timothy Keeney, Connecticut & Rhode Island (November 1994 – May 1996)
6. Robert Shinn, New Jersey (May 1996 – May 1997)
7. Christophe Tulou, Delaware (May 1997 – May 1998)
8. Trudy Coxe, Massachusetts (May 1998 – November 1998)
9. John P. Cahill, New York (November 1998 – June 2000)
10. Arthur Rocque, Jr., Connecticut (June 2000 – March 2001)
11. Nick DiPasquale, Delaware (March 2001 – April, 2001)
12. Jan Reitsma, Rhode Island (June 2001 – November 2003)
13. Bradley M. Campbell, New Jersey (November 2003 – June 2005)
14. Robert Golledge, Massachusetts (July 2005 – June 2006)
15. David K. Paylor, Virginia (July 2006 – June 2007)
16. Lisa Jackson, New Jersey (July 2007 – June 2008)
17. Jared Snyder, New York (July 2008 – June 2009)
18. Shari Wilson, Maryland (June 2009 – June 2010)
19. Laurie Burt, Massachusetts (June 2010 – January 2011)
20. Colin O’Mara, Delaware (January 2011 – June 2012)
21. Daniel C. Esty – Connecticut (June 2012 – June 2013)
22. Robert Summers – Maryland (June 2013 – June 2014)
23. Jane (Kozinski) Herndon – New Jersey (June 2014 – June 2015)
24. Patricia Aho – Maine (June 2015 – September 2015 )
25. Jared Snyder – New York (September 2015 - June 2016)
26. Ben Grumbles - Maryland (June 2016 - June 2018)
27. Shawn Garvin - Delaware (June 2018 - June 2020)
28. Terry Gray - Rhode Island (June 2020 - June 2021)
29. Paul Baldauf - New Jersey (June 2021 – June 2022)
30. Tommy Wells - District of Columbia (June 2022 - January 2023)
31. Melanie Loyzim - Maine (January 2023 - June 2024)
32. Christine Kirby - Massachusetts (June 2024 – June 2025)
33. Emma Cimino - Connecticut (June 2025 – present)
