= Jane Nishida =

American lawyer and government official (born 1955)

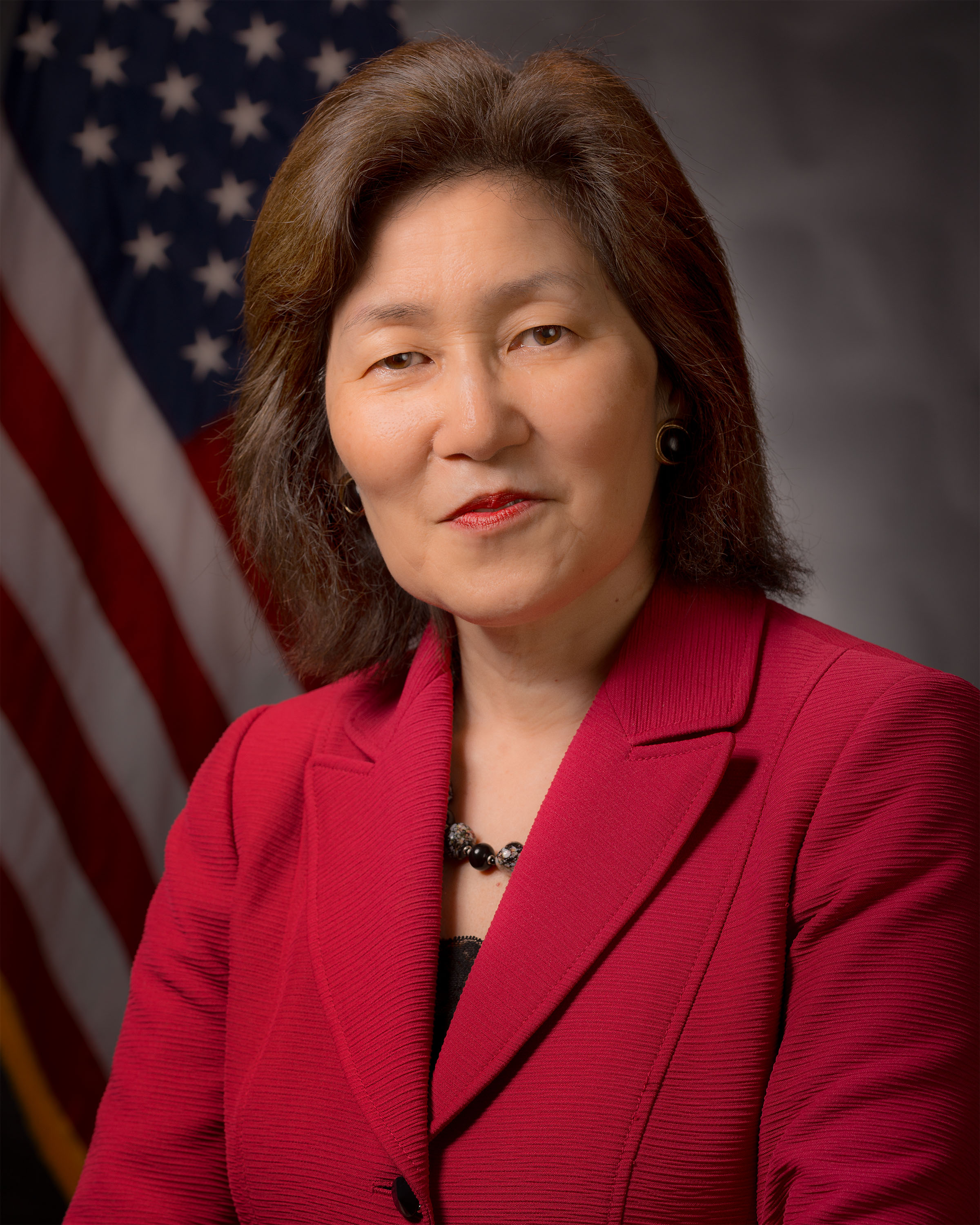
- Official portrait, 2021

Acting Administrator of the Environmental Protection Agency
- In office January 1, 2025 – January 20, 2025
- President: Joe Biden
- Deputy: Dan Utech (acting)
- Preceded by: Michael S. Regan
- Succeeded by: Kimberly Patrick (acting)
- In office January 20, 2021 – March 11, 2021
- President: Joe Biden
- Preceded by: Charlotte Bertrand (acting)
- Succeeded by: Michael S. Regan

Acting Deputy Administrator of the Environmental Protection Agency
- In office October 5, 2024 – December 31, 2024
- President: Joe Biden
- Preceded by: Janet McCabe
- Succeeded by: Dan Utech (acting)

Assistant Administrator of the Environmental Protection Agency for International and Tribal Affairs
- In office September 28, 2021 – January 20, 2025
- President: Joe Biden
- Preceded by: Chad McIntosh

Personal details
- Born: April 26, 1955 (age 71) Bethesda, Maryland, U.S.
- Education: Lewis and Clark College (BA); Georgetown University (JD)

Jane Toshiko Nishida (born April 26, 1955) is an American lawyer and government official. She served as the assistant administrator in the Office of International and Tribal Affairs of the U.S. Environmental Protection Agency during the presidency of Joe Biden. Nishida served as the acting Administrator of the Environmental Protection Agency from January 20 to March 11, 2021, and again from January 1 to January 20, 2025. Nishida also served as acting Deputy Administrator of the Environmental Protection Agency from October 5 to December 31, 2024.

== Life ==
Nishida was born in Bethesda, Maryland on April 26, 1955. She earned a B.A. in international relations from Lewis & Clark College in 1977, and a J.D. from Georgetown University Law Center in 1980.

Nishida was a counsel in the Maryland General Assembly during 1981–1984, and then worked in the Governor's Legislative Office until 1991. She was then the Executive Director of the Chesapeake Bay Foundation during 1991–1995. Nishida was Maryland Secretary of the Environment from March 27, 1995, to April 26, 2002. Nishida then became a senior environmental specialist at The World Bank. She began working for the EPA in 2011.

Political offices
Preceded by Charlotte Bertrand; Acting	Administrator of the Environmental Protection Agency; Acting; 2021	Succeeded by Michael S. Regan
Preceded by Michael S. Regan	Administrator of the Environmental Protection Agency; Acting; 2025	Succeeded by Kimberly Patrick; Acting
