= Michael S. Regan =

American environmental regulator (born 1976)

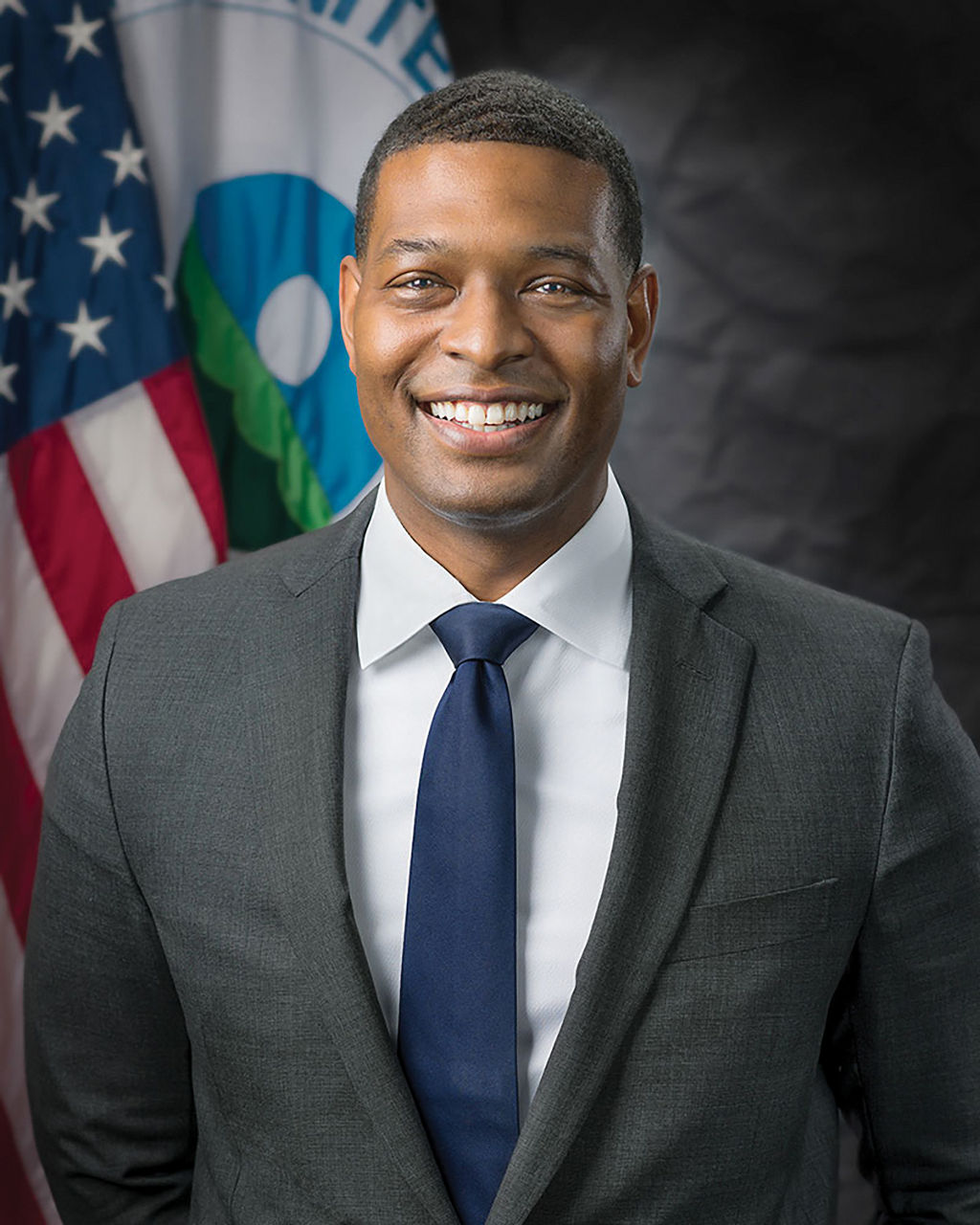
- Official portrait, 2021

16th Administrator of the Environmental Protection Agency
- In office March 11, 2021 – December 31, 2024
- President: Joe Biden
- Deputy: Janet McCabe; Jane Nishida (acting)
- Preceded by: Andrew R. Wheeler
- Succeeded by: Lee Zeldin

2nd Secretary of the North Carolina Department of Environmental Quality
- In office January 3, 2017 – March 11, 2021
- Governor: Roy Cooper
- Preceded by: Donald van der Vaart
- Succeeded by: Dionne Delli-Gatti

Personal details
- Born: Michael Stanley Regan; August 6, 1976 (age 49) Goldsboro, North Carolina, U.S.
- Party: Democratic
- Spouse: Melvina
- Children: 2
- Education: North Carolina A&T State University (BS); George Washington University (MPA)
- Regan's voice Regan on his goals for the EPA. Recorded May 18, 2022

Michael Stanley Regan (born August 6, 1976) is an American environmental regulator who served as the 16th Administrator of the Environmental Protection Agency under President Joe Biden from 2021 to 2024. He was the first African American man to serve in the role.

Regan has formerly served as the secretary of North Carolina's Department of Environmental Quality and air quality specialist in the United States Environmental Protection Agency (EPA). Since leaving the EPA at the end of the Biden Administration, Regan returned to North Carolina as a Distinguished Fellow at the Duke University Sanford School of Public Policy.

== Early life and education ==
A native of Goldsboro, North Carolina, Regan is the son of Mavis Regan, a nurse for nearly 30 years, and Zeb Stuart Regan Jr., a Vietnam War veteran, retired colonel in the North Carolina Army National Guard, and former agricultural extension agent. He has a brother and a sister. Growing up, he hunted and fished with his father and grandfather in the inner coastal plain of North Carolina.

Regan attended North Carolina A&T State University (HBCU), where he received a Bachelor of Science degree in earth and environmental science. He then attended George Washington University in Washington, D.C., where he received a Master of Public Administration.

== Early career ==
Regan began his career as an environmental regulator for the Environmental Protection Agency during the Clinton administration and Bush administration from 1998 to 2008. He then joined the Environmental Defense Fund (EDF), where he ultimately became the associate vice president for clean energy and a Southeast regional director. He remained at the EDF for over eight years.

== North Carolina Department of Environmental Quality ==
In 2017, North Carolina governor Roy Cooper selected Regan to serve as the secretary of the North Carolina Department of Environmental Quality. During his tenure, he launched the state's Environmental Justice and Equity Board with a charter to advise the Secretary on how best to advance environmental justice and promote community engagement, particularly across historically underserved and marginalized communities.

He also worked to develop the state's Clean Energy Plan, which aims to reduce private sector greenhouse gas emissions by 2030 and ultimately move towards carbon neutrality by 2050. The plan also outlines recommendations and goals of accelerating innovations in clean energy technologies, while creating opportunities for rural and urban communities across North Carolina. In addition, Regan oversaw the state's climate change interagency council, which worked to advance Governor Cooper's pledge to achieve carbon neutrality by 2050.

In January 2020, Regan secured an agreement with Duke Energy for the largest coal ash contamination cleanup in United States history. The company committed to excavating eighty million tons of ash across seven of nine coal ash deposits. His department also ordered the chemical company Chemours to address and eliminate toxic per- and polyfluoroalkyl substances (PFAS), which they were dumping into the Cape Fear River upstream of a major source of drinking water. While generally favored by environmental organizations, Regan has clashed with the environmental movement. In 2018, he approved permits for the Atlantic Coast Pipeline, though the project was ultimately cancelled.

== Administrator of the Environmental Protection Agency ==
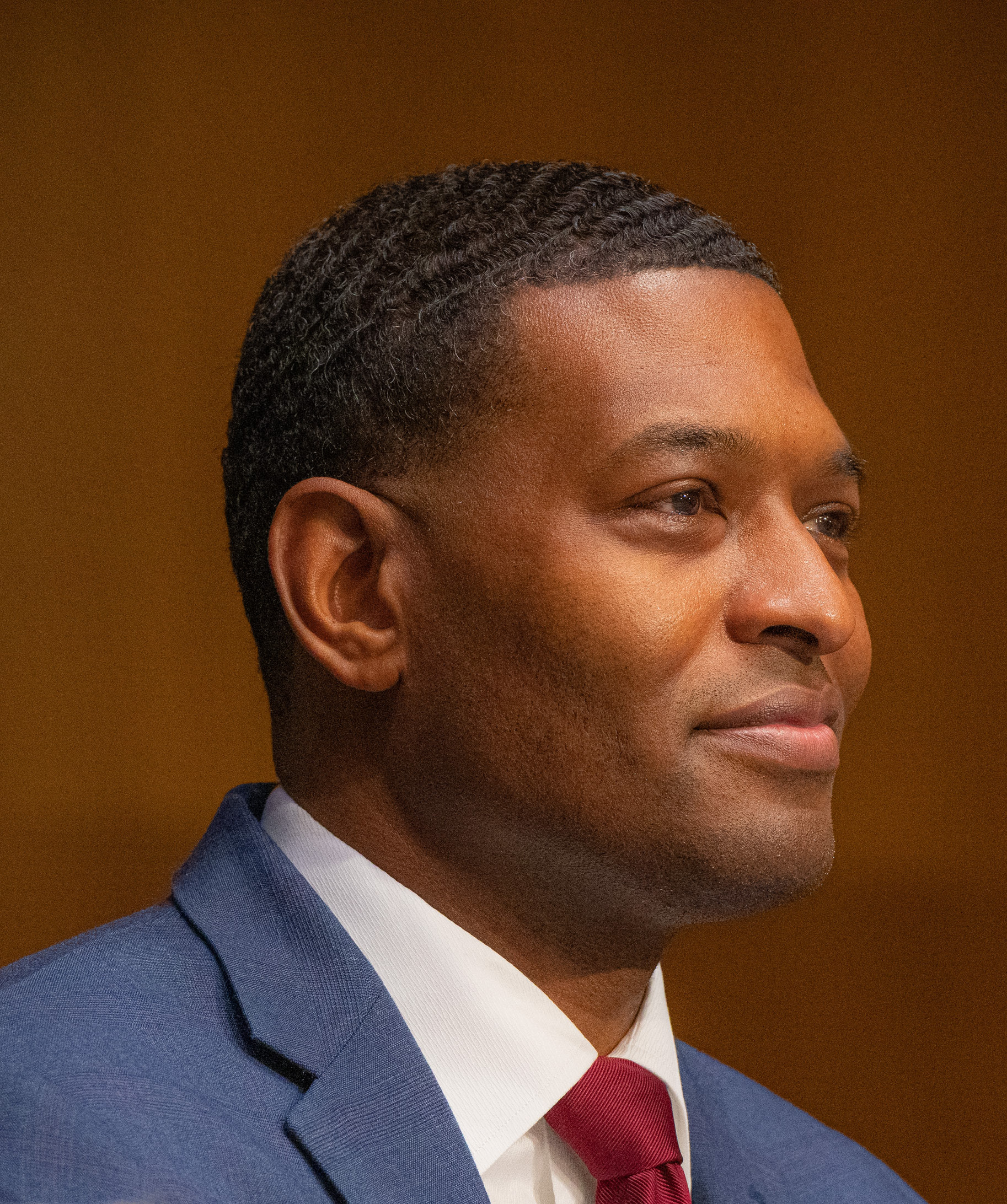
Regan in 2021

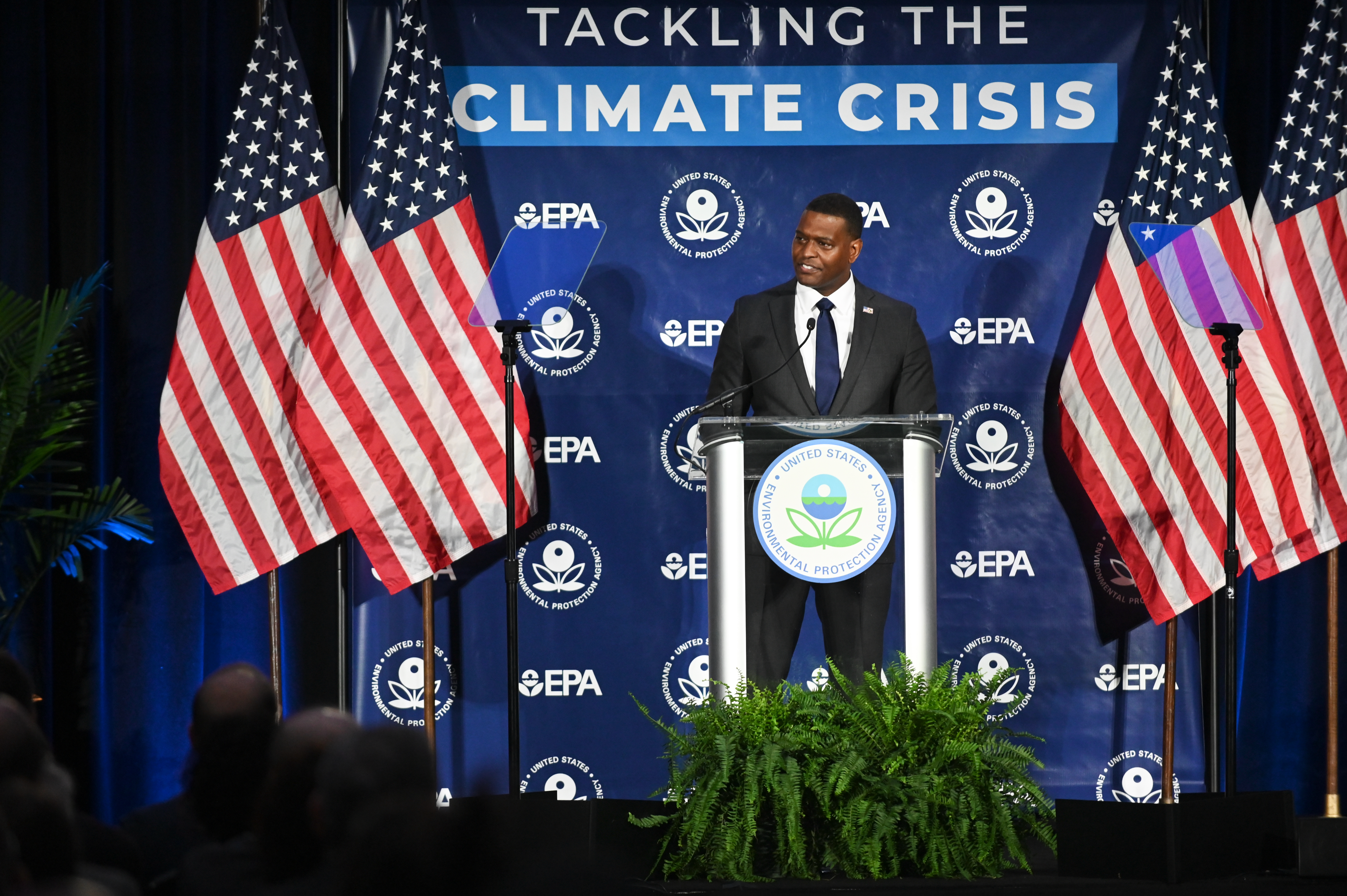
Regan announcing new Clean Air Rules in 2023

=== Nomination ===
On December 17, 2020, members of the Biden presidential transition team told the press Regan would be nominated to serve as the next United States Environmental Protection Agency administrator. Regan's nomination was endorsed by the Environmental Protection Network, an organization composed of former EPA appointees and career staff which was created to oppose the Trump administration's efforts to roll back environmental regulations.

On February 9, 2021, members of the United States Senate Committee on Environment and Public Works (EPW) Committee voted 14–6 to send Regan's nomination as EPA administrator for a full Senate vote. The full Senate confirmed his nomination 66–34 on March 10, 2021, and he was sworn in on March 11, 2021.

=== Tenure ===
Regan is the first Black man to run the agency and is responsible for helping to advance the Biden administration's commitment to combating climate change, promoting green energy innovations, and addressing the effects of environmental racism.

Under his leadership, the EPA and United States Army issued a revised rule defining the federal government's jurisdiction over waters and wetlands under the Clean Water Act.

On December 20, 2024, he announced his intention to resign from his position effective on December 31.

== Political future ==
In 2023, speculation surrounding a potential candidacy by Regan for Governor of North Carolina in the 2024 election arose. Valerie Foushee, U.S. Representative from North Carolina's 4th congressional district, stated that she had heard "murmurings, nothing concrete" about a potential bid.

== Personal life ==
Regan lives in Raleigh, North Carolina, with his wife, Melvina, and son, Matthew. Their first-born son, Michael Stanley Regan Jr. ("MJ") died on August 16, 2012, from stage IV high-risk neuroblastoma at the age of one.

Political offices
| Preceded by Jane Nishida; Acting | Administrator of the Environmental Protection Agency; 2021–2024 | Succeeded by Lee Zeldin |
