= Vaart =

Vaart may refer to:

- van der Vaart (surname), people named van der Vaart
- Nieuwe Vaart, canal in Amsterdam
- Vlaardingse Vaart Bridge, bridge in the Netherlands
