= Marcus Peacock =

American government official

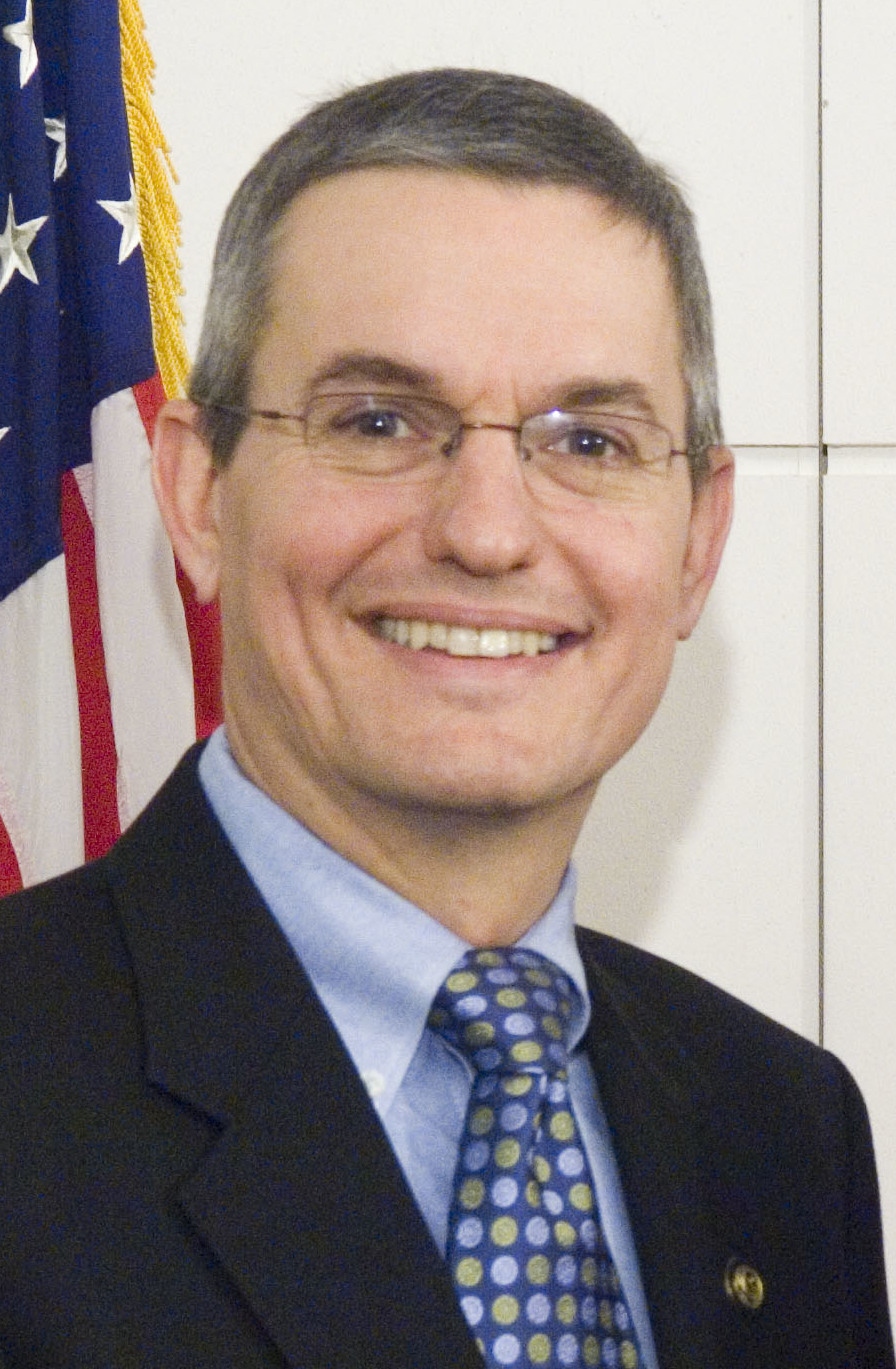
- Peacock in 2006

Deputy Administrator of the Environmental Protection Agency
- In office August 8, 2005 – January 20, 2009
- President: George W. Bush
- Preceded by: Stephen L. Johnson
- Succeeded by: Bob Perciasepe

Personal details
- Born: March 21, 1960 (age 66)
- Education: University of Southern California (BS); Harvard University (MPP)

Marcus C. Peacock (born March 21, 1960) is an American industrial engineer and regulatory policy scholar. He served as the minority staff director at the U.S. Senate Committee on the Budget from 2011 to 2013, and was the deputy administrator of the United States Environmental Protection Agency from 2005 to 2009. Following his work for the federal government, Peacock worked on the Jeb Bush 2016 presidential campaign and served as the chief operating officer of lobbying organization Business Roundtable.

== Education ==
Peacock received a Bachelor of Science degree in industrial and systems engineering from the University of Southern California and a Master of Public Policy from Harvard University's John F. Kennedy School of Government. He is a Fellow of the National Academy of Public Administration and a senior member of the Institute of Industrial Engineers.

== Bush administration career prior to EPA ==
Before working at EPA, Mr. Peacock was an associate director at the U.S. Office of Management and Budget (OMB).

While at OMB, Mr. Peacock created the Performance Assessment Rating Tool, or PART, which was used to rate the effectiveness of federal programs. The PART won Harvard University's Innovations in Government Award in 2005 and the American Society for Public Administration's Leadership Award in 2007. During this time, Mr. Peacock also helped develop a performance-based system for funding U.S. Army Corps of Engineers' projects and for this work, in 2006, was awarded the Army's Outstanding Civilian Service Medal.

== EPA deputy administrator ==
During his tenure Peacock overhauled EPA's performance management system. This included publishing a quarterly performance report to the public called the EPAStat Quarterly Report, the first 'Stat' program in the federal government. EPAStat copied performance management systems used by local governments, such as "CitiStat" in the City of Baltimore. These improvements led to EPA winning the President's Quality Award for Overall Management, "the highest award given to federal agencies for management excellence," in 2007 and 2008. It is the first time a federal agency has won the award back-to-back. Peacock was an early adopter of Web 2.0 technology in government and was the first federal political appointee to maintain a public blog.

== The Pew Charitable Trusts ==
Under a two-year contract with the Pew Charitable Trusts from 2009 to 2010, Peacock directed Subsidyscope, an initiative to collect data on subsidies provided by the U.S. government and make this information available to the public.

== Jeb Bush 2016 campaign ==
During Governor Bush's presidential campaign, Peacock served as Bush's deputy director for policy and assisted in directing a group of policy experts. Peacock's work included production of policy ideas and documents for the candidate, management of external working groups, and coordination with Political and Communications departments.

== Minority staff director ==
Peacock served as the minority staff director for the United States Senate, Committee on the Budget from January 2011 to June 2013. His duties included directing staff during committee markup and floor consideration of the fiscal year 2014 budget resolution including the processing of 573 floor amendments—more than double the previous high—and 106 separate votes. Further, over several months in 2012, Peacock assisted minority senators in successfully defending seven consecutive attempts by the majority to waive Budget Act points of order on the Senate floor—the longest such streak since 1974.

== Distinguished Research Professor ==
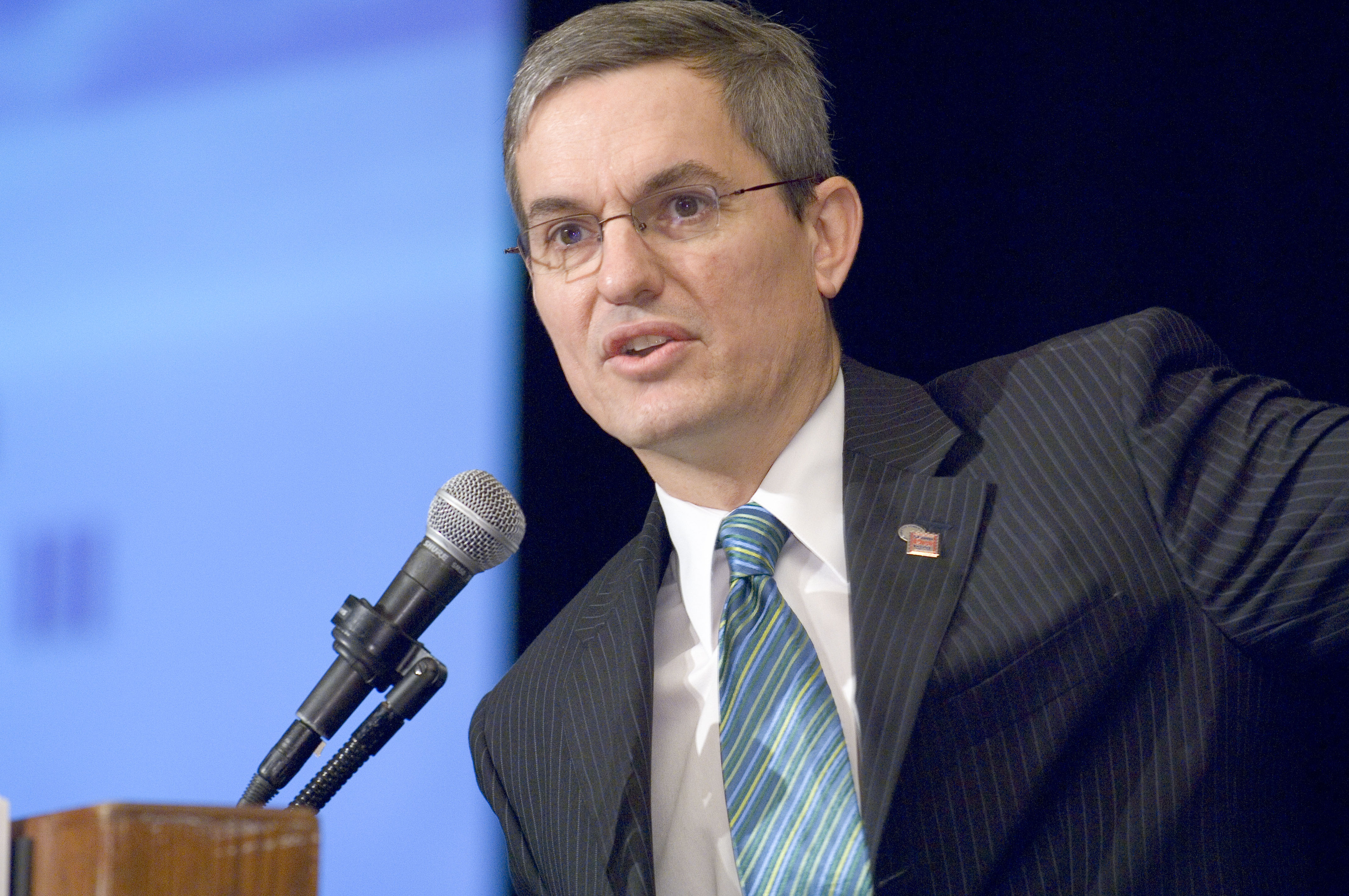
Peacock at the World Energy Forum 2006

From March 2013 to June 2016 Peacock served as a visiting scholar for the George Washington University Regulatory Studies Center. In July 2016 he received the designation of Distinguished Research Professor. As part of his role at the Regulatory Studies Center he writes articles and public comments on regulatory policy and relevant political events.

== Business Roundtable ==
Marcus Peacock was the chief operating officer of lobbying organization Business Roundtable from 2017 to 2022. Donald Trump waived Peacock's five-year lobbying ban on administration officials before Peacock joined Business Roundtable.
