= North Carolina Department of Environmental Quality =

Environmental agency of North Carolina

- Great Seal of the State of North Carolina

Agency overview
- Formed: 2015
- Preceding agency: Department of Environmental and Natural Resources (established 1971)
- Jurisdiction: State of North Carolina
- Headquarters: 217 West Jones Street, Raleigh, North Carolina
- Employees: 1,519
- Agency executive: D. Reid Wilson, Secretary
- Parent agency: Governor of North Carolina
- Website: www.deq.nc.gov

The North Carolina Department of Environmental Quality (NCDEQ) is an agency of the government of North Carolina that focuses on the preservation and protection of natural resources and public health. The department is headed by the Secretary of Environmental Quality, who is appointed by the Governor of North Carolina and is a member of the North Carolina Cabinet. The Department of Environmental Quality was formed in 2015 and it was preceded by the Department of Environmental and Natural Resources, which was formed in 1971 by the North Carolina Executive Reorganization Act. The current secretary is Elizabeth Biser, who was appointed to the role by Governor Roy Cooper.

== History ==
The department was originally established as the Department of Environmental and Natural Resources by the Executive Organization Act of 1971. In 1977 its name was changed to the Department of Natural Resources and Community Development.

== Divisions ==
Current Divisions of the NCDEQ include:

- Air Quality
- Coastal Management
- Energy, Mineral, and Land Resources
- Environmental Assistance and Customer Service
- Environmental Education and Public Affairs
- Marine Fisheries
- Legislative and Intergovernmental Affairs
- Mitigation Services
- Waste Management
- Water Infrastructure
- Water Resources
- Financial Services
- General Counsel
- Human Resources
- Stewardship Program

== Secretaries ==
The Secretaries of the Department of Environmental Quality have included:

- D. Reid Wilson, January 2025 - present
- Elizabeth Biser, July 2021 until January 2025
- Dionne Delli-Gatti (acting), March 2021 until June 2021
- Michael S. Regan, January 2017 until March 2021.
- Donald R. van der Vaart, January 2015 until December 2016.

As the Department of Environmental and Natural Resources, the Secretaries included the following:

- John E. Skvarla, III, 2013 - 2014
- Dee A. Freeman, 2009 - 2013
- William G. Ross Jr., 2001 - 2009
- William E. Holman, 1999 - 2001
- Wayne McDevitt, 1997 - 1999
- Jonathan B. Howes, 1993 - 1997
- William W. Cobey Jr., 1989 - 1993
- S. Thomas Rhodes, 1985 - 1988
- James A. Summer, 1984 - 1985
- Joseph W. Grimsley, 1981 - 1983
- Howard N. Lee, 1977 - 1981
- George W. Little, 1976 - 1977
- James E. Harrington, 1973 - 1976
- Charles W. Bradshaw Jr., 1971 - 1973
- Roy G. Sowers, 1971

== Marine Patrol ==
The North Carolina Marine Patrol is part of the Division of Marine Fisheries. The mission of the Marine Patrol is to "ensure sustainable marine and estuarine fisheries for the benefit of the people of North Carolina". The patrol have jurisdiction over the coastal waters of the state, up to three miles offshore, and up to 200 miles offshore in respect of some federally-regulated species. Carter Witten was appointed colonel of the Marine Patrol in February 2019.

The Marine Patrol are responsible for ensuring compliance with state rules and regulations relating to fisheries and fishing. The work of the Patrol is divided into three districts (Northern, Central and Southern) and an aviation section. Officers are responsible for regulating and inspecting commercial and recreational fishermen, and also provide a general patrol service on waterways, piers, and beaches in coastal areas. The Patrol are also responsible for providing inspection services through the fish supply chain, including wholesalers and restaurants.

== Works cited ==
- Cheney, John L. Jr., ed. (1981). North Carolina Government, 1585-1979: A Narrative and Statistical History (revised ed.). Raleigh: North Carolina Secretary of State. OCLC 1290270510.
