= Lisa P. Jackson =

American politician; EPA administrator

Lisa Jackson
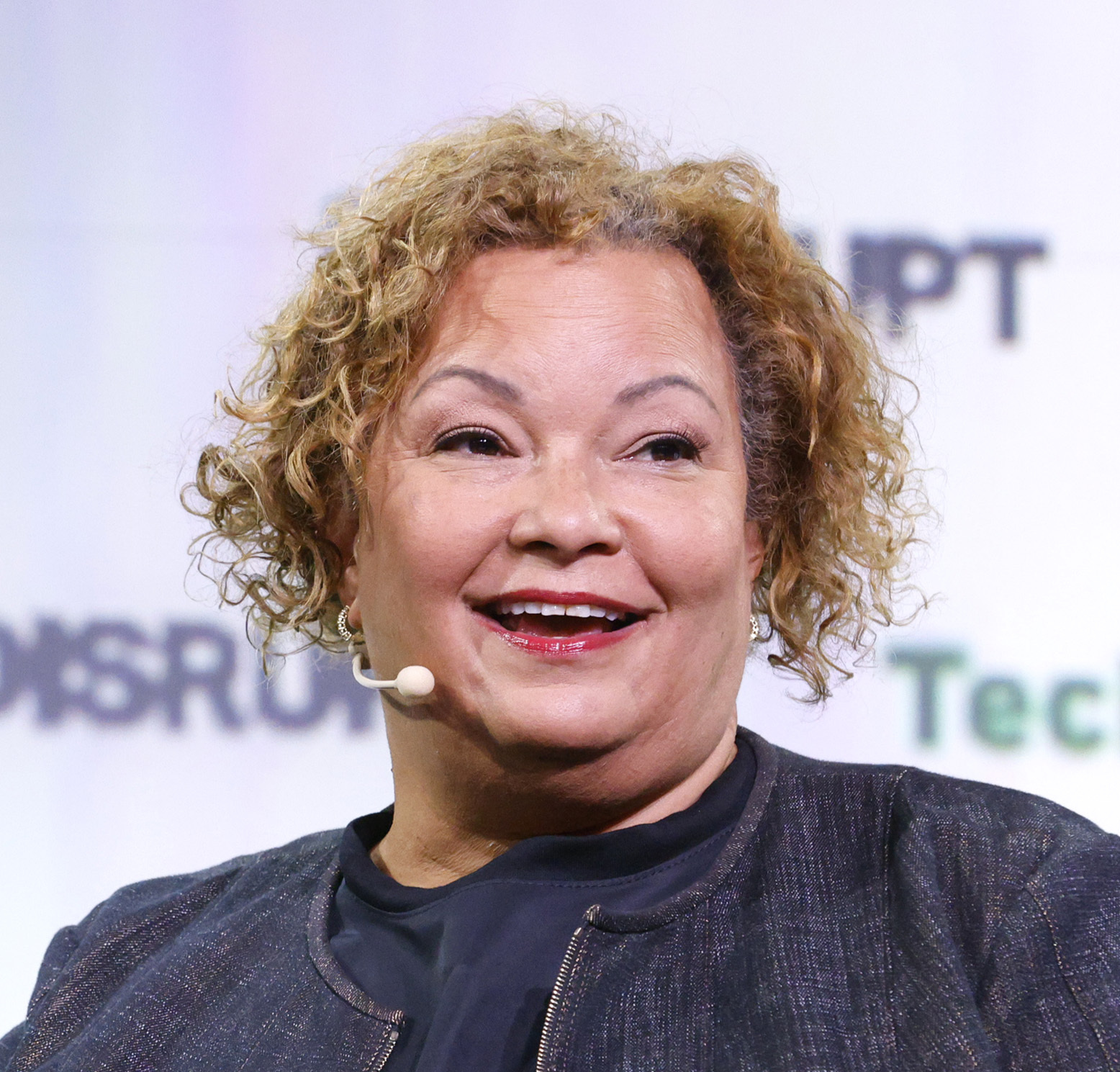
- Jackson in 2023

12th Administrator of the Environmental Protection Agency
- In office January 23, 2009 – February 19, 2013
- President: Barack Obama
- Deputy: Bob Perciasepe
- Preceded by: Stephen Johnson
- Succeeded by: Gina McCarthy

Chief of Staff to the Governor of New Jersey
- In office December 1, 2008 – December 15, 2008
- Governor: Jon Corzine
- Preceded by: Bradley Abelow
- Succeeded by: Edward McBride

Commissioner of Environmental Protection of New Jersey
- In office February 28, 2006 – November 30, 2008
- Governor: Jon Corzine
- Preceded by: Bradley Campbell
- Succeeded by: Mark Mauriello

Personal details
- Born: Lisa Perez; February 8, 1962 (age 64) Philadelphia, Pennsylvania, U.S.
- Party: Democratic
- Spouse: Kenneth Jackson
- Children: 2
- Education: Tulane University (BS); Princeton University (MS)

Lisa Perez Jackson (born February 8, 1962) is an American chemical engineer who served as the administrator of the United States Environmental Protection Agency (EPA) from 2009 to 2013. She was the first African American to hold that position.

In 2002, Jackson joined the New Jersey Department of Environmental Protection as the assistant commissioner of compliance and enforcement and assistant commissioner for land use management. New Jersey governor Jon Corzine appointed Jackson the state's commissioner of environmental protection in 2006. Jackson also briefly served as Corzine's chief of staff in late 2008.

On December 15, 2008, President-elect Barack Obama nominated Jackson to serve as administrator of the Environmental Protection Agency; she was confirmed by the U.S. Senate on January 23, 2009, and took office that same day. During her tenure as EPA administrator, Jackson oversaw the development of stricter fuel efficiency standards and the EPA's response to the Deepwater Horizon oil spill; authorized the recognition of carbon dioxide as a public health threat, granting the EPA authority to set new regulation of greenhouse gases under the Clean Air Act; and proposed amending the National Ambient Air Quality Standards to set stricter smog pollution limits. In December 2012, Jackson announced she would step down as EPA administrator effective February 15, 2013; she was succeeded by Deputy Administrator Bob Perciasepe, who served as acting administrator until the Senate confirmed Gina McCarthy as a permanent successor on July 18, 2013.

== Early life, education and family ==
Jackson was born in Philadelphia and was adopted two weeks after her birth by Benjamin and Marie Perez. She grew up in Pontchartrain Park, a predominantly African-American middle-class neighborhood of New Orleans, Louisiana. In 1979, Jackson graduated as valedictorian from St. Mary's Dominican High School in New Orleans. Due to her exceptional performance in mathematics, she received a scholarship from the National Consortium for Graduate Degrees for Minorities in Engineering & Science, which allowed her to gain early exposure to a college environment.

She attended Tulane University with a scholarship from Shell Oil Company. Jackson was also named a National Merit Scholar. A dean at the Tulane School of Engineering inspired her to pursue engineering, and she graduated summa cum laude with a Bachelor of Science in chemical engineering in 1983. Jackson went on to earn a Master of Science in chemical engineering from Princeton University in 1986.

Jackson's mother was living in New Orleans at the time Hurricane Katrina flooded the city in 2005, and Jackson drove her out of the city. Jackson is married to Kenneth Jackson and is the mother of two children.

Jackson has been a resident of East Windsor Township, New Jersey, along with her husband and two sons.

On July 13, 2013, she was initiated into Delta Sigma Theta sorority as an honorary member during the organization's Centennial Celebration in Washington, DC.

== Early EPA and DEP career ==
As a child, Jackson did not feel any particular affinity for the outdoors, but she became interested in environmental matters following the national and international coverage of the Love Canal Disaster. Prior to the EPA, she spent a year and a half working at Clean Sites, a nonprofit advocating for accelerated cleanup of contaminated areas.

In 1987, Jackson joined the United States Environmental Protection Agency (EPA) at its headquarters in Washington, D.C., as a staff-level engineer. She then moved to the agency's regional office in New York City. During her tenure at EPA, Jackson worked in the federal Superfund site remediation program, developing numerous hazardous waste cleanup regulations and directing multi-million dollar hazardous waste cleanup projects throughout central New Jersey. She later served as deputy director and acting director of the region's enforcement division.

After 16 years with EPA, Jackson joined the New Jersey Department of Environmental Protection (DEP) in March 2002 as assistant commissioner of compliance and enforcement. She served as the assistant commissioner for land use management during 2005. Jackson headed numerous programs, including land use regulation, water supply, geological survey, water monitoring and standards, and watershed management. She focused on developing a system of incentives for stimulating what was in her opinion the right growth in the right places. Under her leadership, the state Department of Environmental Protection developed regulatory standards for implementing the landmark Highlands Water Protection and Planning Act.

== New Jersey commissioner of environmental protection ==
Jon Corzine, Governor of New Jersey, nominated her to serve as commissioner of the New Jersey Department of Environmental Protection. Serving in that position, Jackson led a staff of 2,990 responsible for protecting and improving New Jersey's land, air, and water environment. In addition to overseeing environmental programs for the state, as commissioner, Jackson oversaw state parks and beaches, fish and wildlife programs and historic preservation. As commissioner in July 2006, she had to shut down all state parks and beaches due to the state governmental shutdown in relation to the state budget delay.

As the state's chief environmental enforcer, Jackson led compliance sweeps in Camden and Paterson, two largely working-class cities in which people of color formed the majority of the population and where the effects of pollution on public health had long been neglected. She launched the environmental initiative following multicultural outreach efforts to inform and involve community residents and businesses. Working with county officials, New Jersey State Police and the federal Environmental Protection Agency, the New Jersey Department of Environmental Protection then mobilized more than 70 inspectors to conduct upward of 1,000 compliance investigations in the two cities, the first of a series of enforcement sweeps.

The online environmental magazine Grist interviewed several New Jersey environmental activists and reported that opinion about Jackson was divided: "The split seems to be between those who work on energy and climate policy in the state's capital [who were supportive of Jackson] and those who work on toxic cleanups at the local level [who were critical of her]."

== Chief of staff to the governor of New Jersey ==
On October 24, 2008, Corzine announced that Jackson would take over as his chief of staff, effective December 1, 2008, succeeding Bradley Abelow. As Chief of Staff Jackson would have served as Corzine's top advisor and chief political liaison to the State Legislature. However, Jackson was tapped by President Barack Obama to become administrator of the EPA just days after she became Corzine's chief of staff and resigned on December 15, 2008.

== EPA administrator ==
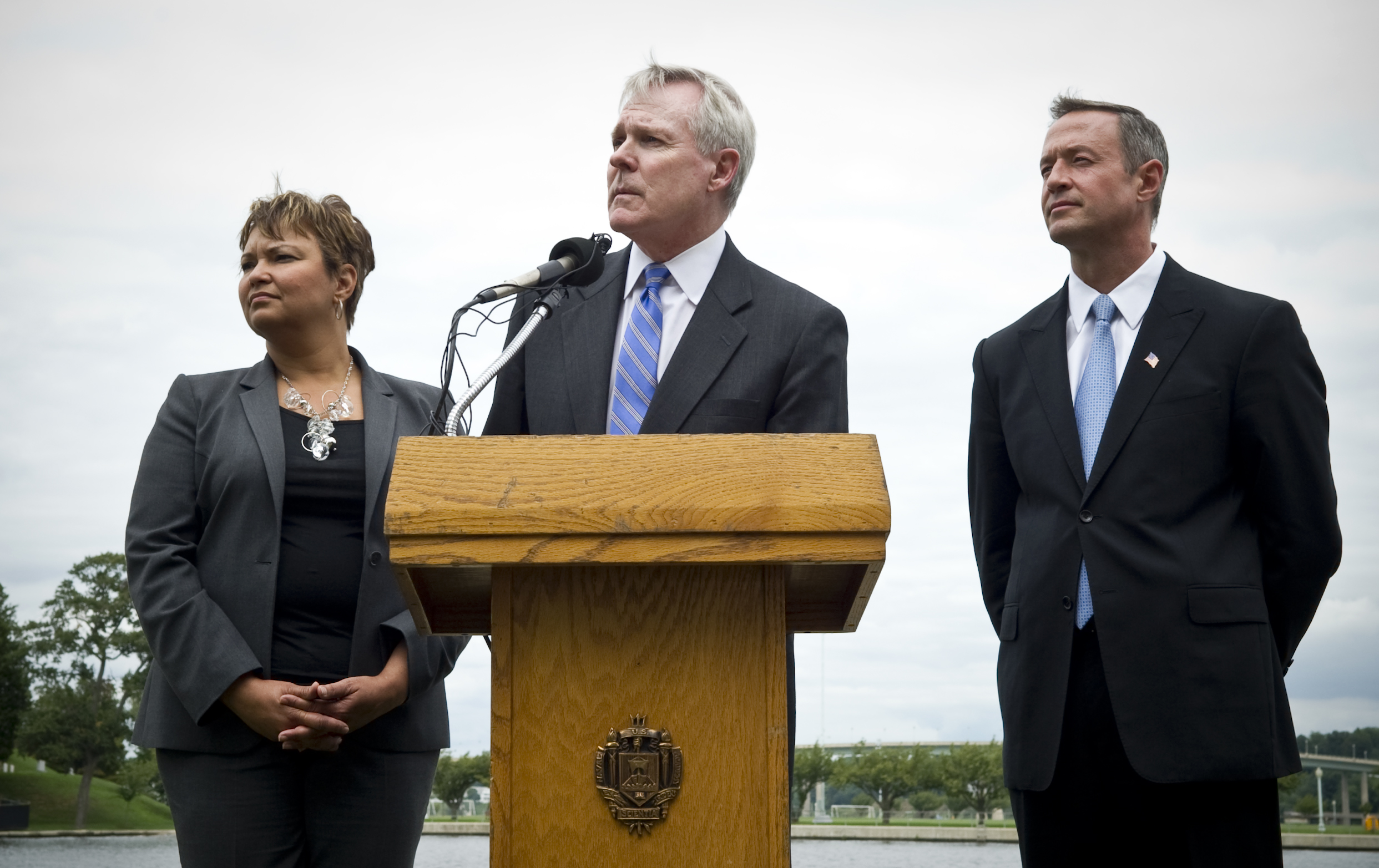
Jackson with Secretary of the Navy Ray Mabus (center), and Maryland Governor Martin O'Malley (right)

On December 15, 2008, then President-elect Barack Obama officially designated Jackson as the nominee for Administrator of the Environmental Protection Agency. She was confirmed by voice vote in the U.S. Senate on January 22, 2009. Jackson is the first African American to serve as EPA administrator, along with being the fourth woman and second New Jerseyan to hold the position. Her deputy administrator was Bob Perciasepe, and additionally she had three associate, twelve assistant, and ten regional administrators overseeing some 17,000 agency employees.

By the EPA's own statements, Administrator Jackson pledged to focus on core issues of protecting air and water quality, preventing exposure to toxic contamination in U.S. communities, and reducing greenhouse gases. She pledged that all of the agency's efforts would follow the best science, adhere to the rule of law, and be implemented with unparalleled transparency. By the same statements, she made it a priority to focus on vulnerable groups – including children, the elderly, and low-income communities – that are particularly susceptible to environmental and health threats. She promised that all stakeholders will be heard in the decision-making process.

She became the first EPA administrator to focus on reforming the Toxic Substances Control Act of 1976, which regulates the introduction of new or already existing chemicals. Indeed, she has called this the issue "closest to my heart ... The law and the structure of the law in no way is modern enough or has enough teeth."

On December 8, 2009, Jackson said in a written statement that the finding, which declares carbon dioxide and five other greenhouse gases a threat to public health, marks the start of a U.S. campaign to tackle greenhouse gas emissions.

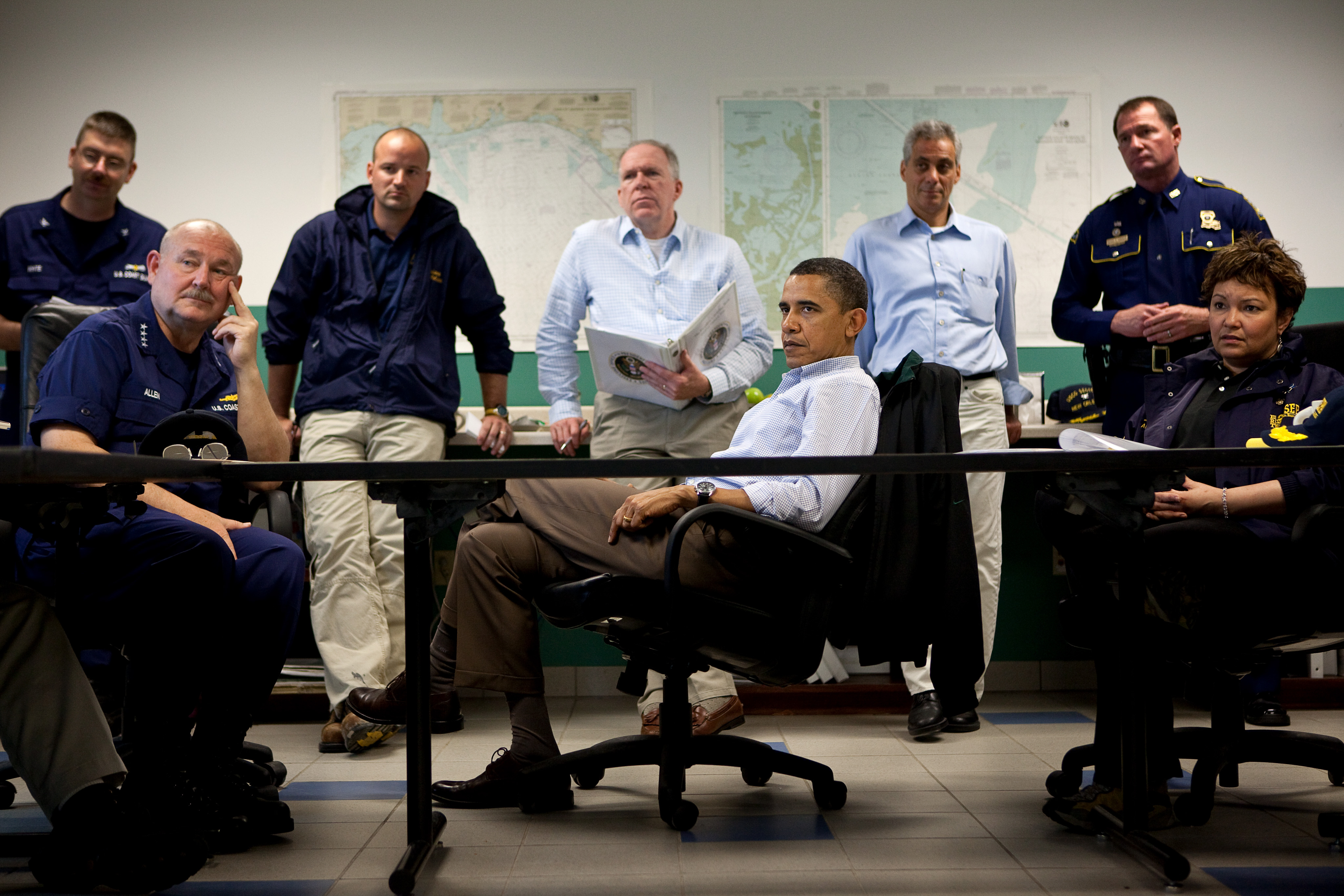
Jackson at a 2010 briefing on the Deepwater Horizon oil spill at the Coast Guard Station Venice in Venice, Louisiana

After the Deepwater Horizon drilling rig explosion, the Obama administration ordered the EPA, the Department of Homeland Security and the Department of Interior to coordinate federal emergency response efforts. Jackson's agency oversaw environmental and public health concerns during the Deepwater Horizon oil spill, including air and water monitoring and assessing aquatic life and other environmental destruction. Jackson authorized and defended BP's choice to use the dispersant Corexit to combat the 210 million gallons of oil spilled in the Gulf of Mexico. The use of Corexit was criticized because it's more toxic and less effective than other EPA approved dispersants, which later studies showed that Corexit had major effects on the aquatic life's food chain in the Gulf of Mexico. While testifying before the Senate Appropriations Subcommittee, Jackson called the use of dispersants an "environmental tradeoff", and that "We know dispersants are generally less toxic than the oils they break down." Jackson's agency faced a lawsuit in response of the spill from health and environmental groups for not setting adequate guidelines on how and where dispersants can be used safely. Jackson was designated by President Obama to serve as chair on the Gulf Coast Ecosystem Restoration Task Force, a federal effort to restore damages and preserve the ecosystem in the Gulf of Mexico.

In 2011, Jackson laid out a plan for stricter limits on the National Ambient Air Quality Standards. The plan was based on adopting a 2007 recommendation from the EPA's science advisory board to set the NAAQS no higher than 70 parts per billion and no lower than 64 parts per billion, though it was later set to 75 parts per billion in 2008. Jackson met opposition to the smog standards proposal from economic advisors within Obama's administration, along with his chief of staff William Daley and regulatory affairs administrator Cass Sunstein. After recommending the plan to President Obama, he conclusively rejected the proposal saying that "Ultimately, I did not support asking state and local governments to begin implementing a new standard that will soon be reconsidered." His decision was met with anger from environmentalists and a lawsuit from environmental and health associations, with calls and speculation on whether Administrator Jackson would resign in protest. Jackson later announced that she would stay with the EPA, "respected President Obama's decision" and that her Agency would "aggressively implement" the curtailed version of the ozone standards.

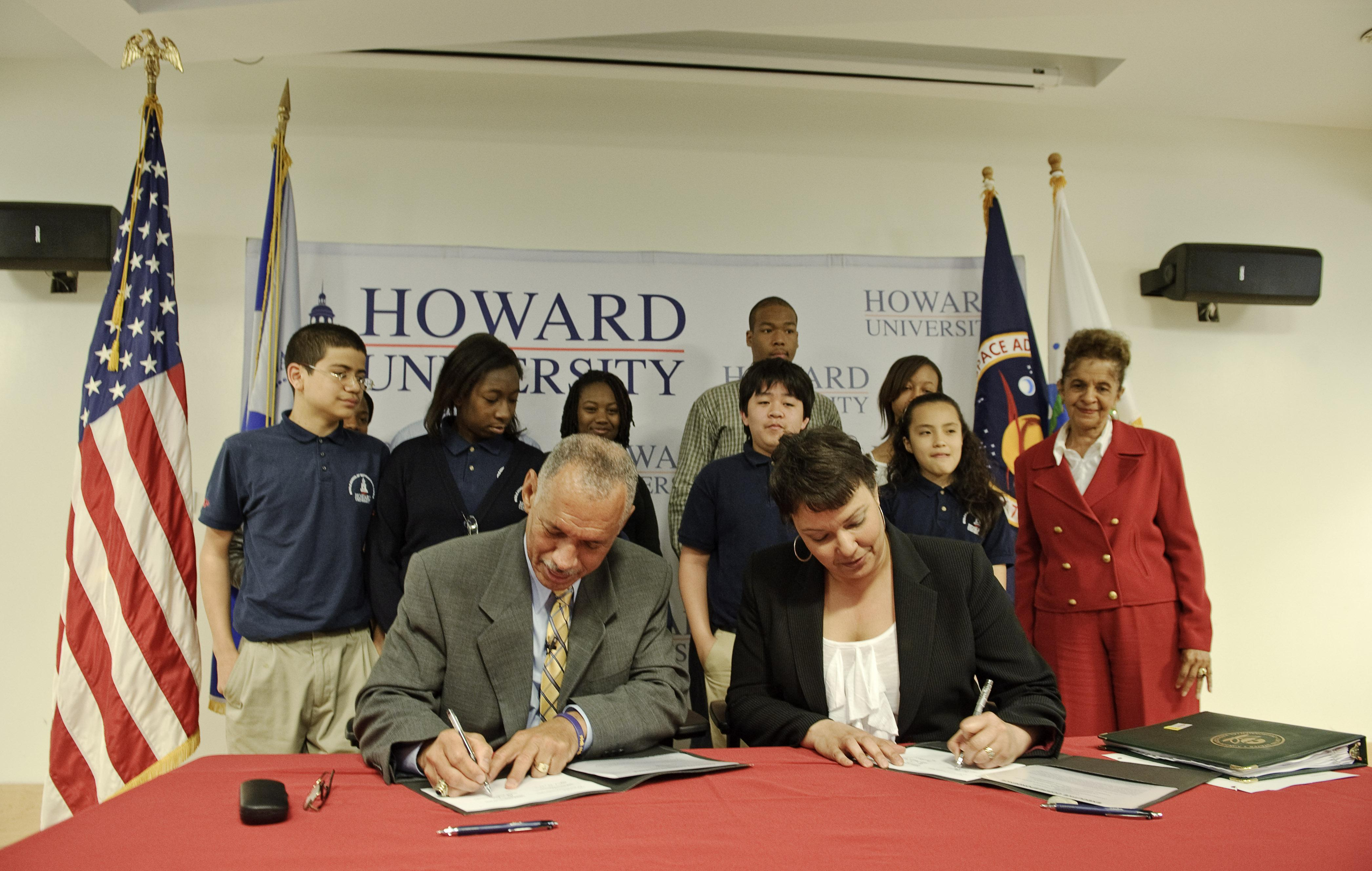
NASA administrator Charles Bolden and Jackson sign an agreement in 2010 to continue collaboration between the two agencies.

Media outlets and industry figures often refer to Jackson's testimony during a May 2011 Senate Hearing Committee that she is not aware of any cases where hydraulic fracturing itself has contaminated water. A 1987 EPA report and reports released since May 2011, however, have identified hydraulic fracturing as the likely source of water contamination in several cases.

During an event with youth environmental leaders at Howard University, Jackson was asked by students about the controversial proposed Keystone Pipeline, she said that "To me, it's awesome; it's awesome that we're having this conversation in this country. This should be a moment where we're having a big conversation." She also urged caution on the proposed project saying that "This isn't a little tiny pipeline; this is a pipeline that cuts our country literally in half."

Jackson spoke out against the Senate Joint Resolution 26 (the Murkowski Amendment), which would take away the EPA's authority to regulate greenhouse gas emissions under the Clean Air Act, which was expanded by the 2007 Supreme Court decision in Massachusetts v. Environmental Protection Agency. In an op-ed in the Huffington Post on the Murkowski Amendment, Jackson said that "now is not the time to take a big step backward, by doubling down on the kinds of energy and environmental policies that keep America addicted to oil." Jackson has argued against claims by lobbying groups and members of congress that the EPA is responsible for a "train wreck" of new clean air regulations and the effect of existing EPA regulations on the economy. Jackson said that "Big polluters are lobbying Congress for loopholes to use our air and water as dumping grounds. The result won't be more jobs; it will be more mercury in our air and water and more health threats to our kids." (For her part, Senator Lisa Murkowski, the author of the amendment, argued that the regulations risked damaging the American economy.)

During her tenure as head of the EPA, Jackson received criticism from the coal industry and Republican members of the House and Senate, most notably Oklahoma senator Jim Inhofe, for claims of the EPA overreaching on regulating toxins released from coal ash and power plant mercury emissions. Senator Inhofe, at the time a ranking member on the Senate Committee on the Environment who did not believe that human activity causes global climate change, called on Jackson to reconsider new greenhouse gas regulations after the Climatic Research Unit email controversy. With Jackson responding saying that "The science behind climate change is settled, and human activity is responsible for global warming," and that "That conclusion is not a partisan one." Though Jackson and Inhofe have conflicted views on Environmental issues, in an interview he called her "One of my favorite Liberals."

On December 13, 2012, the assistant inspector general notified the EPA they would be conducting an audit into recordkeeping practices associated with the use of private email accounts by Jackson under the name of "Richard Windsor." The Justice Department agreed to release 12,000 emails at a rate of 3,000 per week from this account beginning January 14, 2013, in response to a lawsuit brought by a Washington attorney.

On December 27, 2012, Jackson announced that she would be stepping down from her position as EPA administrator. According to the New York Post, Jackson submitted her resignation because she believed that the Obama administration would move to support the Keystone pipeline and she did not want this to occur on her watch. Jackson left office on February 15, 2013, and was succeeded by Deputy Administrator Bob Perciasepe.

At a House hearing in September 2013, Jackson denied knowledge of any government secrecy and denied that she tried to evade federal recordkeeping laws.

== Tenure at Apple ==
In 2013, Jackson became Apple Inc.'s vice president of environment, policy and social initiatives, reporting to CEO Tim Cook. Apple announced in December 2025 that she would retire in January 2026. In February 2026, Conservation International named Jackson interim chair of its board of directors.

== Awards and honors ==
- Member of the American Academy of Arts and Sciences, elected 2021

Political offices
Preceded by Bradley Campbell	Commissioner of Environmental Protection of New Jersey; 2006–2008	Succeeded by Mark Mauriello
Preceded by Bradley Abelow	Chief of Staff to the Governor of New Jersey; 2008	Succeeded by Edward McBride
Preceded by Stephen Johnson	Administrator of the Environmental Protection Agency; 2009–2013	Succeeded by Gina McCarthy
