= David Fotouhi =

American politician

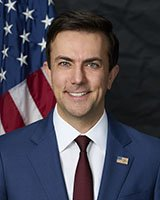
- Official portrait, 2025

Deputy Administrator of the Environmental Protection Agency
- Incumbent
- Assumed office June 16, 2025
- President: Donald Trump
- Preceded by: Janet McCabe

Personal details
- Born: 1984 or 1985 (age 41–42) Venezuela
- Party: Republican
- Education: Vanderbilt University (BA); Harvard University (JD)

David Fotouhi (born 1984/1985) is an American lawyer and government official serving as deputy administrator of the U.S. Environmental Protection Agency (EPA) since June 2025. He previously worked as acting general counsel of the EPA during the first Donald Trump administration and was a partner in environmental litigation at Gibson Dunn.

== Early life and education ==
Fotouhi was born in Venezuela and his family immigrated to the United States when he was a child. He received a bachelor of arts degree from Vanderbilt University and a Juris Doctor from Harvard Law School. He was a law clerk for Raymond Gruender of the United States Court of Appeals for the Eighth Circuit.

== Career ==
Fotouhi began his legal career at the law firm of Gibson Dunn where he worked in the area of environmental litigation. He became a partner at the firm.

In 2017, during the first Donald Trump administration, Fotouhi left Gibson Dunn to join the Environmental Protection Agency (EPA). At the EPA, Fotouhi held roles including acting general counsel, principal deputy general counsel, and deputy general counsel. Fotouhi helped the administration in rolling back climate and water regulations. He directed legal efforts to repeal the 2015 Clean Water Rule rule and set forth a new rule: the Navigable Waters Protection Rule (NWPR), which narrowed federal jurisdiction over waterways, reducing regulatory burdens on landowners and industries. Fotouhi left the EPA in February 2021 to return to his role as a partner at Gibson Dunn.

During his second tenure at Gibson Dunn, Fotouhi challenged the EPA's March 2024 ban on asbestos. Fotouhi argued that the EPA failed to demonstrate that asbestos presents an unreasonable risk of injury for the specific uses that were banned. He also represented International Paper in relation to its use of PFAS and represented a group of businesses in Washington state that sued the EPA over its restrictions on PCB contamination in water.

In January 2025, Fotouhi was nominated by Donald Trump to be deputy administrator of the Environmental Protection Agency. Trump said Fotouhi would "advance pro Growth policies, unleash America's Energy Dominance, and prioritize Clean Air, Clean Water, and Clean Soil for ALL Americans."

During his confirmation hearing, Fotouhi acknowledged that the climate is changing and that burning fossil fuels is a cause. He emphasized China's significant role in contributing to global greenhouse gas emissions. Fotouhi said his focus was on "climate adaptation, not regulation" and that the EPA should confront environmental issues "through smart, transparent, and cost-effective regulatory solutions rooted in sound science" and by "unleashing American innovation".

Fotouhi was confirmed by the U.S. Senate on June 10, 2025, in a 53–41 party-line vote. He was sworn in on June 16, 2025.

In August 2025, Fotouhi announced that the EPA was relaunching efforts to prevent lead poisoning in children.

== Personal life ==
Fotouhi publicly stated that he is a cancer survivor and that his experience battling cancer has shaped his perspective on the EPA's mission to protect human health and the environment.
