= Van der Vaart (surname) =

van der Vaart is a Dutch surname. Notable people with the surname include:

- Aad van der Vaart (born 1959), Dutch statistician
- Donald van der Vaart, American chemical engineer and lawyer
- Jan van der Vaart (ceramist) (1931–2000), Dutch ceramist
- Jan van der Vaart (painter) (c. 1650–1727), Dutch painter
- Macha van der Vaart (born 1972), Dutch field hockey player
- Rafael van der Vaart (born 1983), Dutch footballer
- Sylvie van der Vaart (born 1978), Dutch television personality and model
