= Stephen L. Johnson (politician, born 1951) =

American politician

Stephen Johnson
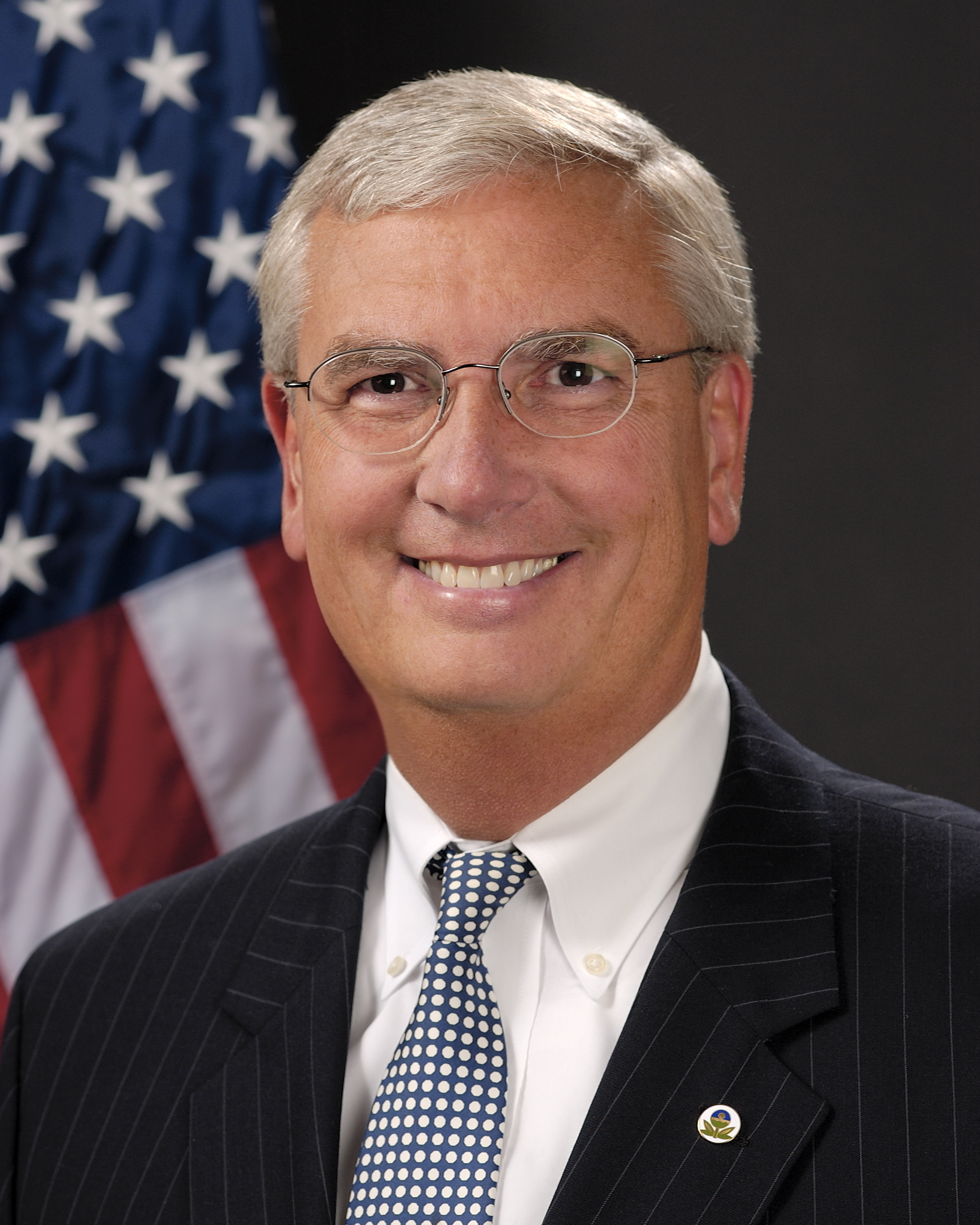

11th Administrator of the Environmental Protection Agency
- In office January 26, 2005 – January 20, 2009; Acting: January 26, 2005 – May 2, 2005
- President: George W. Bush
- Preceded by: Mike Leavitt
- Succeeded by: Lisa P. Jackson
- Acting; July 11, 2003 – July 14, 2003
- President: George W. Bush
- Deputy: Himself (acting)
- Preceded by: Linda Fisher (acting)
- Succeeded by: Marianne Lamont Horinko (acting)

Deputy Administrator of the Environmental Protection Agency
- In office July 11, 2003 – January 26, 2005; Acting: July 11, 2003 – August 1, 2004
- President: George W. Bush
- Preceded by: Linda Fisher
- Succeeded by: Marcus Peacock

Personal details
- Born: Stephen Lee Johnson; March 21, 1951 (age 75) Washington, D.C., U.S.
- Party: Republican
- Spouse: Deborah Jones
- Children: 3
- Education: Taylor University (BS); George Washington University (MS)

Stephen Lee Johnson (born March 21, 1951) is an American politician who served as the Administrator of the Environmental Protection Agency (EPA) under President George W. Bush during the second term of his administration. He has received the Presidential Rank Award, the highest award that can be given to a civilian federal employee.

== Education and career in industry ==
Johnson attended Taylor University, receiving a B.A. in biology followed by a master's degree in pathology from George Washington University. Before working for the U.S. Government, he held a number of positions in laboratory and bio-technology companies. He was also the director of Hazelton Laboratories (now Fortrea). He has been awarded honorary Doctor of Science degrees by Taylor University and Virginia Wesleyan College.

== EPA career prior to becoming administrator ==
Johnson began working at the EPA in 1979. He had been working at a private lab, Litton Bionetics Inc., in Washington. Johnson said that a mentor suggested he get a job at the EPA, learn about regulations from inside government, and then return to industry. "Regulations were really frustrating," Johnson told The Philadelphia Inquirer in 2008, recalling his decision to join the EPA. "I wondered if they really understood what it was like to work in a laboratory."

Johnson's rise from career scientist to EPA chief began in 2001, when he made the jump from civil service bureaucrat to political appointee. In January 2001, Johnson was the lead staff toxics official at EPA. His selection as assistant administrator for the Office of Prevention, Pesticides and Toxic Substances was set in motion by a Kentucky lobbyist, Charles Grizzle, whose clients have included power companies, hospitals, shopping centers, and a formaldehyde industry association. After the 2000 election, Grizzle called then-senior White House aide Karl Rove and suggested that Rove should take a look at Johnson.

When EPA administrator Christine Todd Whitman resigned in 2003, Johnson became the acting deputy administrator, the number two position at EPA, and remained in that position when former Utah governor Mike Leavitt was named administrator.

== EPA Administrator ==
On January 26, 2005, when Leavitt became secretary of the U.S. Department of Health and Human Services, Johnson became acting administrator of EPA. On March 4, 2005, President George W. Bush nominated him formally for the permanent position. He became the first career employee to hold the position of Administrator and the first scientist to head the Agency.

During his April 6, 2005 Senate confirmation hearing, EPA was criticized for support of using human subjects in pesticide testing. Johnson "did not have the opportunity to fully address the committee's criticisms before the hearing was recessed."

In April 2005, a secret hold was placed on his confirmation vote while he evaluated the Children's Environmental Exposure Research Study, which advocated recording the effects of pesticides on children from infancy to age 3. In a letter that reached Senator Barbara Boxer several hours after she raised her concerns, Johnson said, "No additional work will be conducted on this study subject to the outcome of external scientific and ethical review." On April 8, Johnson canceled the study. His nomination was confirmed by the United States Senate on April 29. On February 6, 2006, he issued a final regulation "prohibiting new research involving intentional exposure of pregnant women or children intended for submission to the EPA under the pesticide laws" and other protections.

Johnson tried to block the efforts of 17 states to reduce greenhouse gas emissions and improve fuel economy. He defended his position by arguing that "The Bush administration is moving forward with a clear national solution, not a confusing patchwork of state rules. I believe this is a better approach than if individual states were to act alone." The state rules he was blocking were more stringent than the Bush administration's proposed national solution. Johnson came under investigation for allowing the White House to improperly interfere with the decision to grant California a waiver to limit greenhouse gases. On May 20, 2008, Johnson was questioned for three hours by the House Oversight and Government Reform Committee. On July 29, 2008, four Senators called for Johnson's resignation, alleging he made false statements to Congress.

On December 9, 2008, the Office of Inspector General, US EPA concluded that "EPA's California waiver decision on greenhouse gas automobile emissions met statutory procedural requirements." On May 19, 2009, President Obama also concluded: "a clear and uniform national policy is also good news for the auto industry which will no longer be subjected to a costly patchwork of differing rules and regulations."

Johnson's stance on this and other issues was criticized in an editorial by the scientific journal Nature, which claimed he acted with "reckless disregard for law, science or the agency's own rules — or, it seems, the anguished protests of his own subordinates." In spite of this external criticism and over the objections of the Secretaries of Agriculture, Commerce, Transportation, Energy, Council on Environmental Quality, Office of Science and Technology Policy, Council of Economic Advisors, and Small Business Administration, Johnson issued the Advance Notice of Proposed Rulemaking, "Regulating Greenhouse Gas Emissions Under the Clean Air Act." On February 29, 2008, four labor unions representing 10.000 of the EPA's 17.000 employees (ca. 60%) published an open letter to Johnson, complaining that he had ignored the EPA's official Principles of Scientific Integrity in advancing Bush Administration positions on water fluoridation, pesticide regulation, mercury emissions, and greenhouse gas control.

As Administrator, he managed more than 17,000 Agency employees nationwide and oversaw an annual budget of $7.7 billion. His tenure expired on January 20, 2009.

== Post EPA ==
On June 29, 2010, clean technology company FlexEnergy announced that Johnson had joined its board of directors. According to Johnson, the company's technology can minimize air pollutants in congested cities and industrial sites, as well as provide energy in remote areas around the world.

On November 11, 2010, The Scotts Miracle-Gro Company announced that Johnson had been named to its board of directors.

Johnson also sits on the board of trustees at his alma mater, Taylor University.

Political offices
Preceded by Mike Leavitt	Administrator of the Environmental Protection Agency; 2005–2009	Succeeded by Lisa Jackson
