= Linda Fisher =

American lawyer

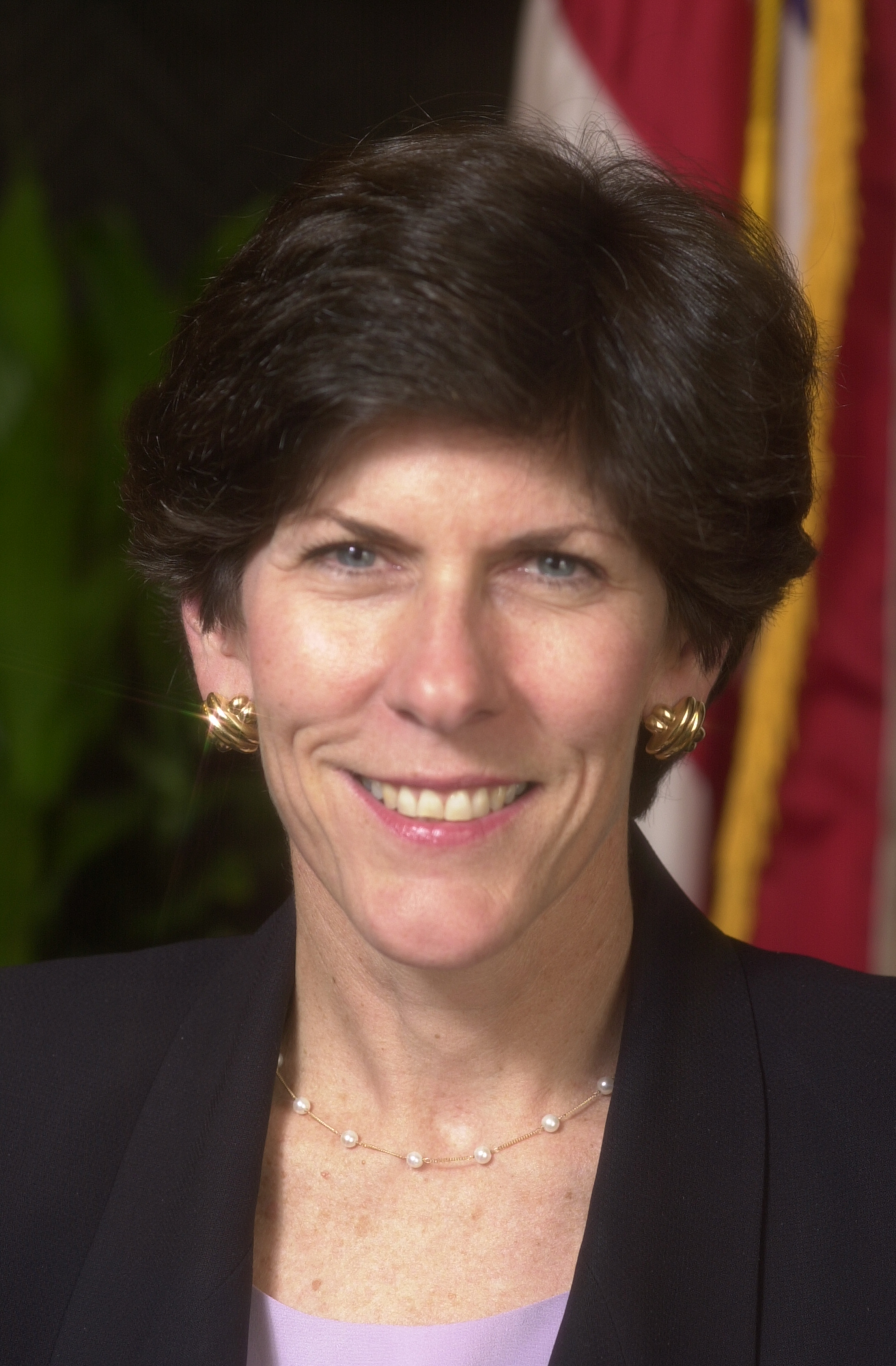

Administrator of the Environmental Protection Agency
- Acting
- In office June 27, 2003 – July 11, 2003
- President: George W. Bush
- Preceded by: Christine Todd Whitman
- Succeeded by: Stephen L. Johnson (acting)

Deputy Administrator of the Environmental Protection Agency
- In office May 31, 2001 – July 11, 2003
- President: George W. Bush
- Preceded by: W. Michael McCabe
- Succeeded by: Stephen L. Johnson

Personal details
- Born: Linda Jane Fisher; June 26, 1952 (age 74) Saginaw, Michigan, U.S.
- Party: Republican
- Education: Miami University (BA); George Washington University (MBA); Ohio State University (JD)

Linda Jane Fisher was a Vice President Safety, Health and Environment and Chief Sustainability Officer of DuPont.

When working for the United States Environmental Protection Agency she was Deputy Administrator in the George W. Bush administration; Assistant Administrator - Office of Prevention, Pesticides and Toxic Substances in the George H. W. Bush administration; and Assistant Administrator - Office of Policy, Planning and Evaluation, and Chief of Staff to the EPA Administrator in the Ronald Reagan administration. She was also Vice President of Government Affairs for Monsanto Company, a pesticide and biotechnology corporation. Fisher was also "Of Counsel" with the law firm Latham & Watkins. She attended Miami University for a B.A. (1974), George Washington University for a master's degree in Business Administration (1978) and the Ohio State University for a Juris Doctor (J.D.) degree (1982).

In an oral history, EPA Administrator William K. Reilly described Fisher as one of his ablest people, proving to be a star as his Assistant Administrator for Toxics and Pesticides.

== Publicity ==
Fisher was mentioned in the documentary Circle of Poison (2018) reporting the export of chemical products manufactured in the US for export that are banned from domestic use.

Fisher was mentioned in the documentary The Future of Food (2004) as an example of a revolving door between Monsanto and the government.

Political offices
Preceded by Christine Todd Whitman	Administrator of the Environmental Protection Agency; Acting; 2003	Succeeded by Marianne Lamont Horinko; Acting
