= Charlotte Bertrand =

American government official

Acting Administrator of the Environmental Protection Agency
- In office January 20, 2021
- President: Joe Biden
- Preceded by: Andrew R. Wheeler
- Succeeded by: Jane Nishida (acting)

Charlotte Bertrand is an American government official who served as Acting Administrator of the United States Environmental Protection Agency in her capacity as Associate Deputy Administrator for Programs for a few hours following the conclusion of the term of Andrew R. Wheeler at noon on January 20, 2021. President Joe Biden signed an executive order naming principal deputy assistant administrator of the Office of International and Tribal Affairs Jane Nishida as Acting Administrator later that day.

Political offices
Preceded by Andrew R. Wheeler	Administrator of the Environmental Protection Agency; Acting; 2021	Succeeded by Jane Nishida; Acting
