= Children's Environmental Exposure Research Study =

Controversial U.S. human experiments

The Children's Environmental Exposure Research Study (or CHEERS) was a study conducted by the United States Environmental Protection Agency designed to examine how children may be exposed to pesticides and other chemicals used in U.S. households, such as phthalates, brominated flame retardants, and perfluorinated compounds (PFOS, PFOA, PFNA, and others). The two-year study began in the summer of 2004 and was conducted in Duval County, Florida, a region with high concentration of pesticides.

On April 8, 2005, Stephen L. Johnson cancelled the study after the program was criticized. Johnson himself was heavily criticized for his support in the use of human test subjects during his tenure as EPA's Assistant Administrator for Toxic Substances.

== Mechanics of the study ==
The study was due to be completed in two years, researchers would follow the progress of 60 young children whose parents sprayed pesticides frequently. They would collect data every six months taken from biological samples such as blood and urine. Parents were also required to document specific information such as food and liquid intake. They must also record their children's activities on video. To qualify, a family has to have a confirmed history of residential pesticide use, a child under the age of 13 months and must agree to continue using pesticides inside the residential abode.

Participating families were promised monetary compensation of up to $970, study T-shirt, framed Certificate of Appreciation, study bib for the baby, calendar, study newsletter, and a camcorder.

== Controversies ==
EPA recruiting information for CHEERS claimed that participation in the study presented "no risk" to the subjects or their families. Critics, however, contended that the state of knowledge about pesticide exposure risks to infants and children while imprecise, suggests that residential pesticide exposure poses developmental risks to infants and children. This meant that CHEERS would have paid families to expose their children to pesticides for two years. EPA denied this, stressing that because CHEERS would have only examined families who used pesticides prior to the study, CHEERS would not have increased the subject families' exposure to pesticides. The argument is based on the fact that the study had an observational, rather than experimental design. There was fear, however, that the study could induce parents to intentionally expose their children to pesticides to be able to qualify in the high-use group of the study.

The study was also criticized for using disproportionately black, lower-income families as subjects. EPA's claim was that Duval County was chosen because they knew that many families in the area were using large amounts of pesticides to control roaches and pests.

The EPA also received $2 million of the proposed 9 million budget for the CHEERS study from the American Chemistry Council, a lobbying group representing 135 chemical companies in exchange for measuring levels of common household chemicals such as flame, retardants, and ingredients in plastic products along with pesticides.

The CHEERS project was terminated in 2005 after it became a political matter. Thereafter, the U.S. Congress also passed a law that bans EPA from funding intentional exposure research that involves children and pregnant or nursing women.

== See also ==
- Philip J. Landrigan
