= Marianne Lamont Horinko =

U.S. Government administrator

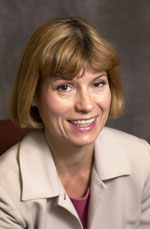

Administrator of the Environmental Protection Agency
- Acting
- In office July 14, 2003 – November 6, 2003
- President: George W. Bush
- Preceded by: Stephen L. Johnson (acting)
- Succeeded by: Mike Leavitt

Personal details
- Born: Marianne Lamont Horinko; May 10, 1961 (age 65) Everett, Massachusetts, U.S.
- Party: Republican
- Education: University of Maryland, College Park (BS); Georgetown University (JD)

Marianne Lamont Horinko (born May 10, 1961) served as Acting Administrator of the United States Environmental Protection Agency (EPA) from July 14, 2003 to November 6, 2003 during the first term of President George W. Bush. Prior to this appointment Horinko was Assistant Administrator for the Office of Solid Waste and Emergency Response (OSWER) at EPA, having been confirmed by the U.S. Senate on October 1, 2001. She continued on as Assistant Administrator until June 1, 2004.

Horinko, an author and speaker on environmental cleanup policy, is currently the President of the Horinko Group, an environmental consulting firm focused on sustainability. She made an unsuccessful bid for a Virginia state Senate seat in late 2009.

== Education ==
Horinko graduated from the University of Maryland, College Park with a Bachelor of Science in analytical chemistry in 1982 and from Georgetown University Law Center with a J.D. in 1986.

== Career and civic service ==
Horinko was an attorney at Morgan, Lewis & Bockius, involved in the areas of pesticides and hazardous waste counseling, Clean Water Act and Superfund litigation, and environmental audits in connection with business transactions. She was responsible for both the Superfund Settlements Project and the Information Network for Superfund Settlements, a policy group of over 120 companies, law firms, and other organizations headquartered in ML&B's Washington office.

During the George H. W. Bush Administration, Horinko was Attorney Advisor to Don Clay, EPA's Assistant Administrator for Solid Waste and Emergency Response. In that capacity she was responsible for Resource Conservation and Recovery Act (RCRA) regulatory issues and Superfund reauthorization. Clay was a career EPA employee who was elevated to the assistant administrator position by William K. Reilly.

After EPA, Horinko was president of Clay Associates, Inc., a national environmental policy consulting firm. She was responsible for launching the RCRA Policy Forum, a membership organization composed of federal and state governments, environmental groups, Capitol Hill staff, and industries interested in furthering constructive dialogue to improve the nation's waste programs. Through July, 1998, Don Clay was serving as president of Don Clay Associates Inc., "a Washington, D.C.-based public policy consulting firm devoted to solid and hazardous waste regulation and environmental cleanup issues." At that time, he took the position of director of regulatory affairs with Koch Industries, one of the companies DCA had been advising, to be based in Washington.

Back at EPA during her tenure as Assistant Administrator, Horinko refocused the goals of her office around five major priorities: Homeland Security/Emergency Response; One Cleanup Program; Land Revitalization; Energy Recovery, Recycling & Waste Minimization; a Retail Environmental Initiative (the Resource Conservation Challenge) and Workforce Development. Following the September 11 attacks in 2001, she spent her first few months at EPA in the role of assisting in environmental cleanup activities at Ground Zero in lower Manhattan, the Pentagon in Washington, D.C., and the anthrax attack at the Hart Senate Office Building.

In 2003, as national program manager, Horinko oversaw EPA's response to the Space Shuttle Columbia disaster. The Brownfields program was signed into law by President Bush in 2002. Under her leadership, the budget for the Brownfields program was doubled.

In mid-May, 2004, in the leadup to the 2004 election, Horinko was questioned in the media relative to an EPA rule about industrial laundry and toxic waste, on the one hand, and gifts to the Bush campaign, particularly by Cintas Corporation founder and Bush Pioneer fundraiser Richard T. Farmer, on the other. Cintas, headquartered in the greater Cincinnati area in the electoral-battleground state of Ohio, was then the biggest company in the industrial laundry business. "In a summary of the rule, the EPA said it would improve 'clarity and consistency' of regulation, 'provide regulatory relief, and save affected facilities over $30 million'" by allowing industrial shop towels to be washed in water that would then go into municipal waste-water treatment systems. At the time, "3 billion of the [towels were being used to] sop up more than 100,000 tons of hazardous solvents such as benzene, xylene, toluene and methyl ethyl ketone" per year. Horinko "said Farmer's campaign contributions had nothing to do with the agency's decision," and Farmer likewise denied he had lobbied EPA directly or contributed to the campaign for the purpose of affecting the EPA ruling. However, Farmer said in the report that he did complain about the rule to Ohio Republican Sen. George V. Voinovich and Rep. Rob Portman, a fellow Bush Pioneer and chairman of Bush's campaign in Ohio. And, "[a]bout the same time in 2002 that Farmer was making his calls and the trade groups were contacting members of Congress, he made a major contribution. On March 19, 2002, Farmer gave $250,000 to the National Republican Congressional Committee." On June 1, Horinko left the agency.

Horinko made a bid for the Republican nomination for the Virginia state Senate seat, 37th District, Fairfax County, Sully District, to replace then-Attorney General-Elect Ken Cuccinelli (R) in a special election. Steve Hunt, who won the nomination and whom Horinko then endorsed, ultimately lost a close race in early January, 2010, to David W. Marsden (D-Fairfax), a result which "def[ied] recent voting trends that saw several Northern Virginia Republicans win big in November."

Horinko is currently president of the Horinko Group, a Washington-based environmental consulting firm.

== Personal life ==
Horinko has two children and lives in Chantilly, Virginia. She resumed use of her maiden name, Marianne Maccini, in 2012. She is active in the lectors ministry at St. Timothy Parish in Chantilly, serves as food coordinator for the Chantilly High School Choral Boosters, and serves as President of the Chantilly High School PTSA.

Political offices
Preceded by Linda Fisher; Acting	Administrator of the Environmental Protection Agency; Acting; 2003	Succeeded by Mike Leavitt
