= Bob Perciasepe =

American politician

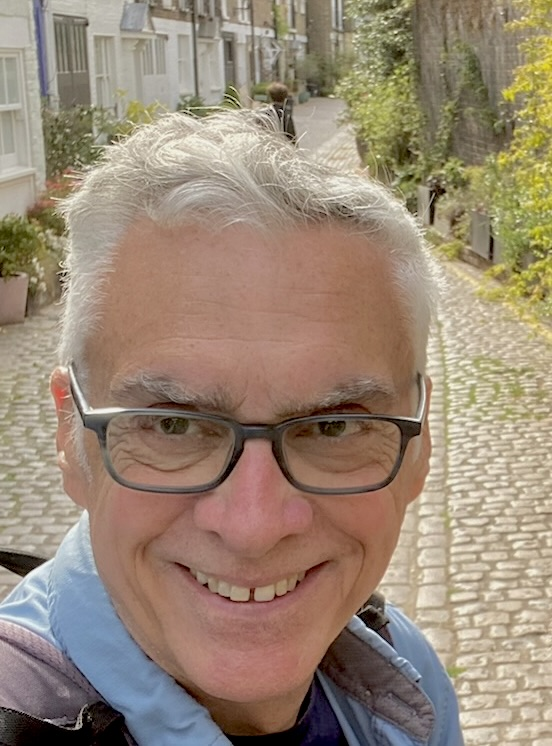

Acting Administrator of the Environmental Protection Agency
- In office February 19, 2013 – July 18, 2013
- President: Barack Obama
- Preceded by: Lisa Jackson
- Succeeded by: Gina McCarthy

Deputy Administrator of the Environmental Protection Agency
- In office December 24, 2009 – August 8, 2014
- President: Barack Obama
- Preceded by: Marcus Peacock
- Succeeded by: Andrew R. Wheeler

Personal details
- Born: Robert Perciasepe New Rochelle, New York, U.S.
- Party: Democratic
- Education: Cornell University (BS); Syracuse University (MPA)

Robert Perciasepe is an American former government official who currently serves as a senior adviser to the nonprofit Center for Climate and Energy Solutions, following his role as President of the organization. Pericasepe also serves as Board Chair to the George B. Storer Foundation and as a Board member for the Keystone Policy Center. He served as the Deputy Administrator and Acting Administrator of the U.S. Environmental Protection Agency during the administration of Barack Obama.

Prior to joining the Obama administration, Perciasepe was Chief Operating Officer for the environmental conservation non-profit National Audubon Society. Before that, he served in the administration of President Bill Clinton as the EPA's Assistant Administrator for clean water and then later as the Assistant Administrator for clean air.

Prior to that time he served as Maryland's Secretary of the Environment after holding the positions of Chief of Capital Planning and Assistant Director for Planning for the city of Baltimore.

== Early life and career ==
Born in New Rochelle, New York, Perciasepe was raised in Brewster, New York and later Ancram, New York. He attended Immaculate High School in Danbury, Connecticut, graduating in 1969. In 1974 he graduated from Cornell University with a Bachelor of Science in natural resources and in 1976 received his Master's Degree in Planning and Public Administration from the Maxwell School of Citizenship and Public Affairs at Syracuse University.

After graduation, Perciasepe began working in the Baltimore City Planning Department (1976–80), where he later served as Chief of Capital Planning (1980–86) and as Assistant Director for Planning (1986–87). In 1987, Perciasepe joined the Maryland Department of the Environment (MDE), serving as Assistant Secretary of Planning and Capital Programs until 1989, when he was appointed Deputy Secretary of the full Department by then Maryland Governor William Donald Schaefer.

In 1987, Governor Schaefer appointed Martin Walsh as the first Secretary of the Environment.

After Governor Schaefer was re-elected in 1990, he announced that he would "reorganize his administration," appointing Perciasepe to be Walsh's replacement as Maryland's Secretary of the Environment, thus making Perciasepe the second Secretary of MDE.

During his tenure as Secretary of the Environment, Perciasepe oversaw the agency's $59 million budget and 770 employees. While there, he took actions that included re-evaluating the Chesapeake Bay Program's efforts to reduce harmful nutrients, chairing the Northeast Ozone Transport Commission for cleaner regional air quality, reducing emissions from cars, and initiating new recycling requirements.

== Early EPA career ==
In 1993, President Clinton appointed Perciasepe to serve as EPA's Assistant Administrator for Water. While in that job, Perciasepe guided development of the Clean Water Action Plan for slowing wetlands loss.

Perciasepe headed the Clinton Administration's engagement with the U.S. Congress in support of passage of new amendments to strengthen the nation's Safe Drinking Water Act - amendments signed into law by President Clinton on August 6, 1996. He was in charge of implementing the new provisions set forth under those amendments, which included setting more protective health standards for drinking water quality, expanding citizen right-to-know information about the quality of their tap water, and improving local infrastructure through a new multibillion-dollar state revolving loan fund.

In 1998, President Clinton appointed Perciasepe to become the EPA's Assistant Administrator for Air and Radiation.

While head of EPA's clean air program, he took action to reduce harmful emissions from cars and heavy duty trucks by requiring reduced sulfur content in gasoline and diesel fuel. He oversaw initial findings on the need to reduce levels of mercury emitted by power plants. And he worked to ensure that EPA standards for any potential nuclear waste repository – for instance, such as the one once proposed for Yucca Mountain – will be protective of human health.

== National Audubon Society ==
After leaving the Clinton Administration in 2001, Perciasepe joined the National Audubon Society as Senior Vice President for Public Policy and head of the Washington, DC, office. In 2004, he was named Chief Operating Officer of the Society, where he coordinated efforts to protect wetlands. While there, Perciasepe also worked with the Board of Directors to establish Audubon Centers in urban areas like Columbus, Dallas and Phoenix to expand access to nature education in underserved communities.

== Deputy Administrator of the EPA ==
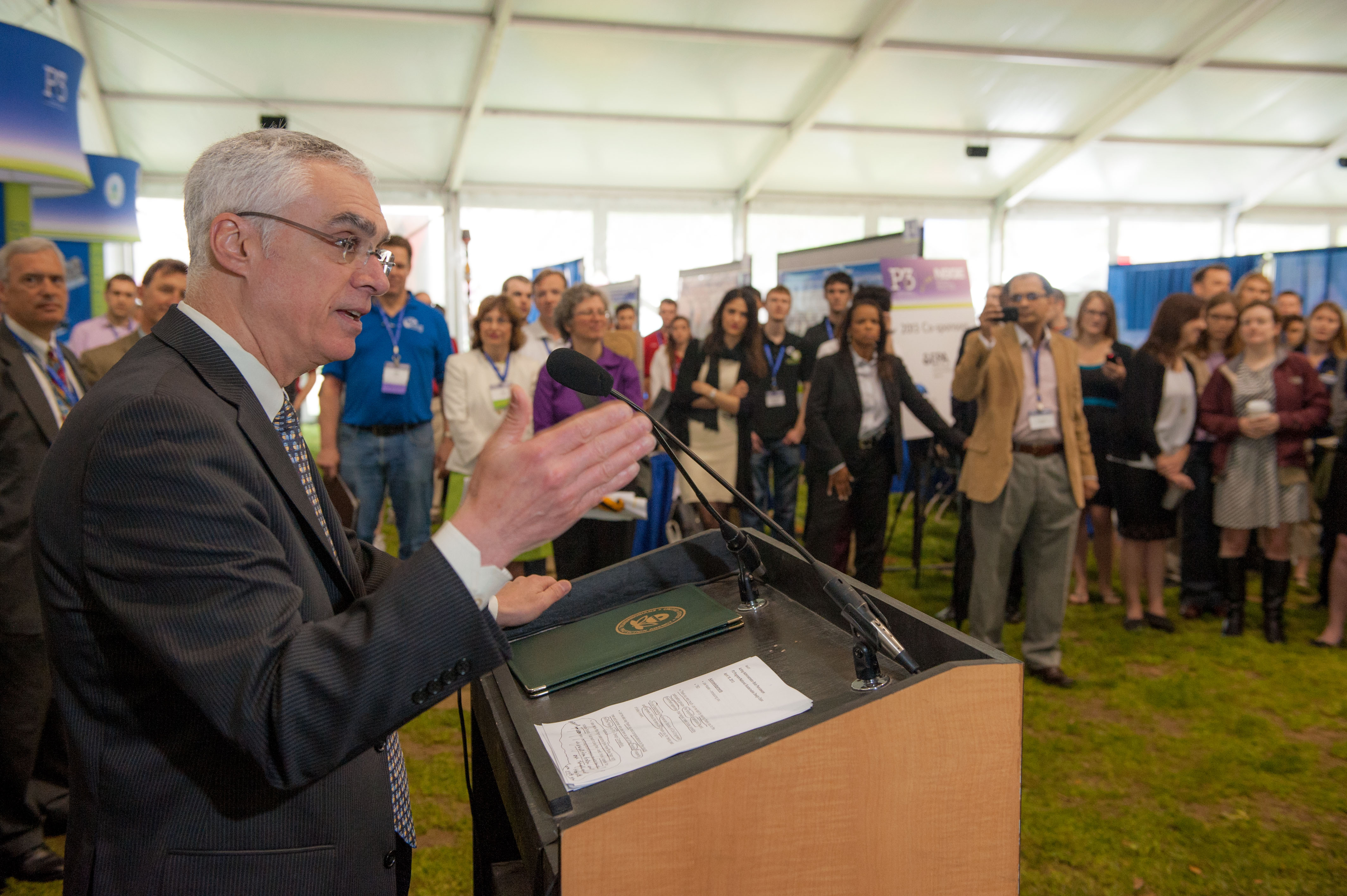
Perciasepe speaks at the National Sustainable Design Expo in 2013

On May 18, 2009, President Barack Obama announced his intentions to nominate Perciasepe as Deputy Administrator of the Environmental Protection Agency and the official nomination came one month later. Perciasepe was confirmed by the Senate on December 24, 2009, becoming the Agency's Deputy Administrator.

On February 15, 2013, EPA Administrator Lisa P. Jackson resigned from her post and Perciasepe was named Acting Administrator in addition to his Deputy role. On July 19, 2013, EPA Administrator Gina McCarthy was sworn in, and Perciasepe resumed his role as Deputy Administrator.

He became president of the Center for Climate and Energy Solutions (C2ES) on August 11, 2014, and served as president until 2021. Perciasepe now serves as a senior adviser on climate change to a limited number of institutions including C2ES. He also serves on a number of non-profit boards including the Executive Committee of the Keystone Policy Center Board and Chair of the George B. Storer Foundation Board

Political offices
Preceded by Marcus Peacock	Deputy Administrator of the Environmental Protection Agency; 2009–2014	Succeeded by Andrew R. Wheeler
Preceded by Lisa Jackson	Administrator of the Environmental Protection Agency; Acting; 2013	Succeeded by Gina McCarthy
