= Janet McCabe =

American lawyer

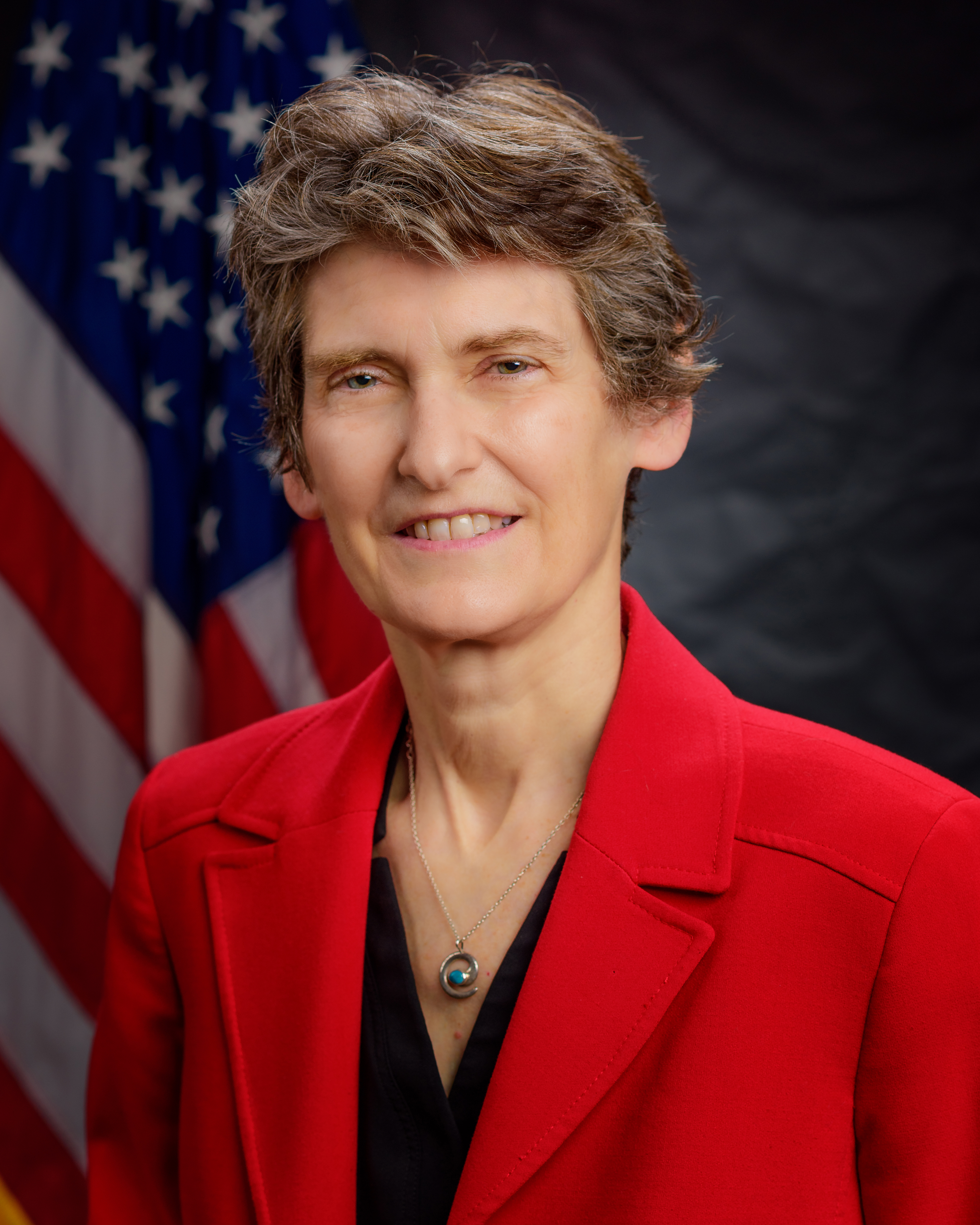

Deputy Administrator of the Environmental Protection Agency
- In office April 29, 2021 – October 4, 2024
- President: Joe Biden
- Preceded by: Andrew R. Wheeler
- Succeeded by: David Fotouhi

Personal details
- Born: Janet Garvin McCabe
- Education: Harvard University (BA, JD)

Janet Garvin McCabe is an American attorney and academic who served as the deputy administrator of the United States Environmental Protection Agency from April 29, 2021, to October 4, 2024.

== Education ==
McCabe earned a Bachelor of Arts degree and Juris Doctor from Harvard University.

== Career ==
McCabe served as the air director of the Indiana Department of Environmental Management from 1999 to 2005 before joining the United States Environmental Protection Agency in 2009 as principal deputy assistant administrator for the Office of Air and Radiation. From July 2013 to January 2017, she served as acting assistant administrator for the Office of Air and Radiation. After leaving government, McCabe became the director of the Environmental Resilience Institute at Indiana University and a professor at the Indiana University Robert H. McKinney School of Law.

On January 15, 2021, it was announced that McCabe would be Joe Biden's nominee for deputy administrator of the United States Environmental Protection Agency. McCabe was confirmed by the US Senate on April 27, 2021, by a vote of 52–42. She was sworn in as Deputy Administrator on April 29, 2021.
