= Andrew R. Wheeler =

American attorney (born 1964)

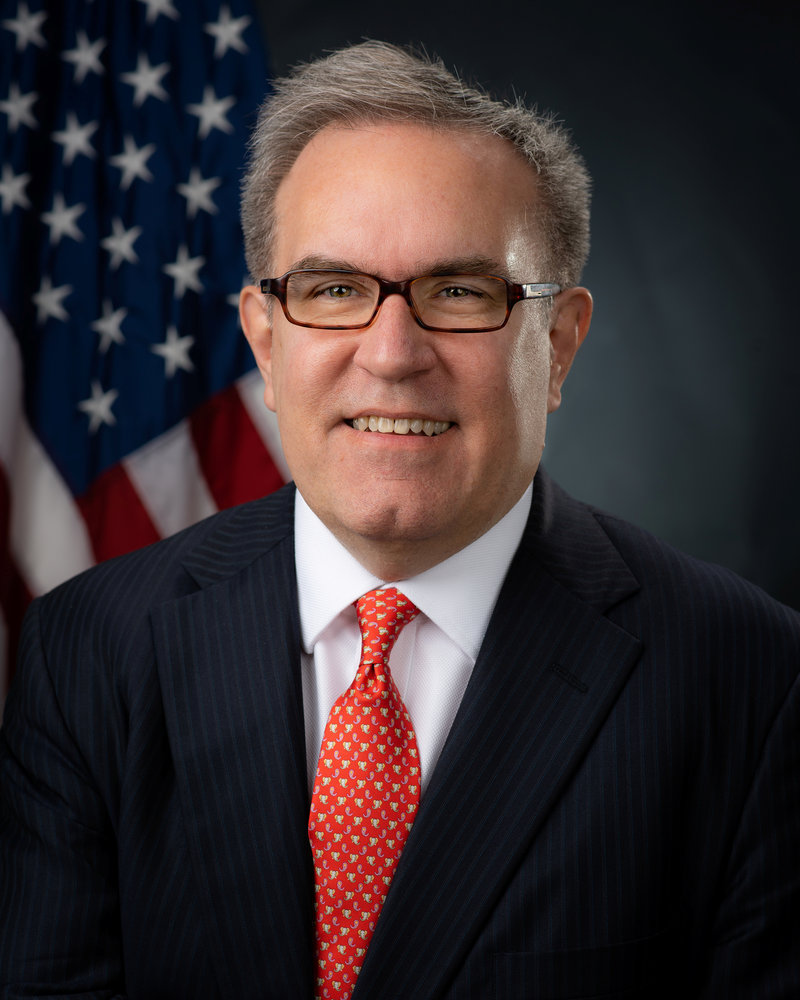
- Official portrait, 2018

12th Virginia Secretary of Natural Resources
- In office January 15, 2022 – March 15, 2024
- Governor: Glenn Youngkin
- Preceded by: Ann Jennings
- Succeeded by: Travis Voyles

15th Administrator of the Environmental Protection Agency
- In office July 9, 2018 – January 20, 2021; Acting: July 9, 2018 – February 28, 2019
- President: Donald Trump
- Deputy: Henry Darwin (acting)
- Preceded by: Scott Pruitt
- Succeeded by: Michael S. Regan

Deputy Administrator of the Environmental Protection Agency
- In office April 20, 2018 – February 28, 2019
- President: Donald Trump
- Preceded by: Robert Perciasepe
- Succeeded by: Henry Darwin (acting)

Personal details
- Born: December 23, 1964 (age 61) Hamilton, Ohio, U.S.
- Party: Republican
- Education: Case Western Reserve University (BA); Washington University in St. Louis (JD); George Mason University (MBA)

Andrew R. Wheeler (born December 23, 1964) is an American attorney who served as the 15th administrator of the Environmental Protection Agency (EPA) from 2019 to 2021. He served as the deputy administrator from April to July 2018, and served as the acting administrator from July 2018 to February 2019. He has been a senior advisor to Governor of Virginia Glenn Youngkin since March 2022. He previously worked in the law firm Faegre Baker Daniels, representing coal magnate Robert E. Murray and lobbying against the Obama administration's environmental regulations. Wheeler served as chief counsel to the United States Senate Committee on Environment and Public Works and to the chairman U.S. senator James Inhofe, prominent for his rejection of climate change. Wheeler is a critic of limits on greenhouse gas emissions and the Intergovernmental Panel on Climate Change.

In October 2017, Wheeler was nominated by President Donald Trump, renominated in January 2018, and confirmed as Deputy Administrator of the EPA in April 2018. On July 9, 2018, Wheeler became the acting administrator following the resignation of Scott Pruitt. On November 16, 2018, President Trump announced he would nominate Wheeler to serve as the EPA's permanent administrator. He was confirmed for the position by a 52–47 vote in the Senate on February 28, 2019.

== Early life and education ==
Wheeler was born in Hamilton, Ohio, on December 23, 1964. He is an Eagle Scout. He obtained a Bachelor of Arts degree, with majors in English and biology, from Case Western Reserve University in Cleveland, Ohio, in 1987; and a Juris Doctor degree from the Washington University School of Law, in 1990. In 1998, he completed a Master of Business Administration degree at George Mason University.

== Career ==
=== EPA ===
Wheeler's first job between 1991 and 1995 was as special assistant to the Information Management Division director in the Environmental Protection Agency's Office of Pollution Prevention and Toxics working on toxic chemical, pollution prevention, and right-to-know issues. Wheeler received the Agency's bronze medal in 1993 and twice in 1994.

=== Senate staff ===
From January 1995 until January 1997, Wheeler worked as Chief Counsel of Senator Jim Inhofe. In 1997, Wheeler entered his first work in Congress as majority staff director at the US Senate Subcommittee on Clean Air, Climate Change, Wetlands, and Nuclear Safety, which Inhofe chaired until 2001; thereafter he was minority staff director under Chairman George Voinovich from 2001 to 2003. From 2003 to 2009, he was chief counsel at the Senate Committee on Environment and Public Works. During this time, Wheeler generally sought to reduce government regulations on industries that generate greenhouse gases. Senator James Inhofe was prominent for his rejection of climate change, and famously brought a snowball to the Senate as alleged proof that climate change was not real.

During his time at the Senate, Wheeler was named by the National Journal as one of the Top Congressional Staff Leaders in 2005 and was a John C. Stennis Congressional Staff Fellow in the 106th Congress.

=== Lobbyist ===
From 2009 until 2017, Wheeler was a lobbyist in the law firm Faegre Baker Daniels' energy and natural resources practice. Since 2009, he represented the coal producer Murray Energy, privately owned by Robert E. Murray, a supporter of President Trump. Murray Energy was Wheeler's best-paying client, paying at least $300,000, and possibly as much as $3,300,000 during the period 2009–2017. Wheeler lobbied against the Obama administration's climate regulations for power plants and also sought to persuade the Energy Department to subsidize coal plants. Wheeler set up a meeting between Murray and Energy Secretary Rick Perry in March 2017; at the meeting, Murray advocated for the rollback of environmental regulations and for protections for the coal industry.

=== EPA deputy administrator ===
In October 2017, Wheeler was nominated by President Trump to become Deputy Administrator of the United States Environmental Protection Agency. His nomination was returned to the White House on January 3, 2018, as the Senate had adjourned at the end of 2017 without taking up the nomination (Senate Rule XXXI, paragraph 6). His nomination was resubmitted and he was confirmed as Deputy Administrator of the EPA on April 12, 2018, by a mostly party-line vote of 53–45, which included three Democratic senators: Joe Manchin, Heidi Heitkamp, and Joe Donnelly.

Since being sworn in, Wheeler has had at least three meetings with former lobbying clients of his in a potential violation of the Trump administration's ethics pledge and the promises that Wheeler made during his confirmation hearing. Justina Fugh, an EPA ethics official, said that Wheeler's meetings with former lobbying clients did not violate the Trump administration's ethics pledge, because Wheeler had not worked on their behalf in the two years prior to joining the EPA. Vermont senator Bernie Sanders said he was "vigorously opposed" to Wheeler replacing Pruitt.

=== EPA acting administrator ===
Scott Pruitt announced on July 5, 2018, he would be resigning effective July 6. He left Wheeler as the acting head of the agency. On October 14, 2018, The New York Times published an op-ed against Wheeler's proposal to denigrate the public health benefits of reducing air pollution, aimed at a 2011 Obama administration finding that saw this as an asset to any information in controlling a particular pollutant. Later, on November 16, 2018, Wheeler was nominated to be Administrator of the EPA, after being deputy administrator for five months.

In 2018, after a National Climate Assessment report about the impact of climate change in the United States was released by the Trump administration (which had been in the works for several years, stretching into the Obama presidency), the EPA under Wheeler's tenure dismissed the report's findings. The EPA falsely claimed that the Obama administration had pushed the authors of the report to focus on the worst-case scenario. In doing so, the EPA cited a story by the Daily Caller, a conservative website founded by Fox News pundit Tucker Carlson. FactCheck.Org wrote about the Daily Caller story that there was no evidence for the claims made, the report focused both on lower and higher scenarios, and much of the report looked at climate change impacts that had already occurred. FactCheck.Org noted that the report underwent multiple reviews, both internally and externally, and that the report was available for public review for three months. The Daily Caller cited as evidence for its claims a memo that allegedly showed that the Obama administration pushed the authors of the report to include worst-case scenarios; FactCheck.Org noted the memo "does not show that the Obama administration pushed for certain scenarios".

Asked in November 2018 to name three EPA policies that had contributed to cleaner air, Wheeler struggled to answer, and two of his three answers were about rollbacks of Obama administration policies intended to curb pollution.

=== EPA administrator ===
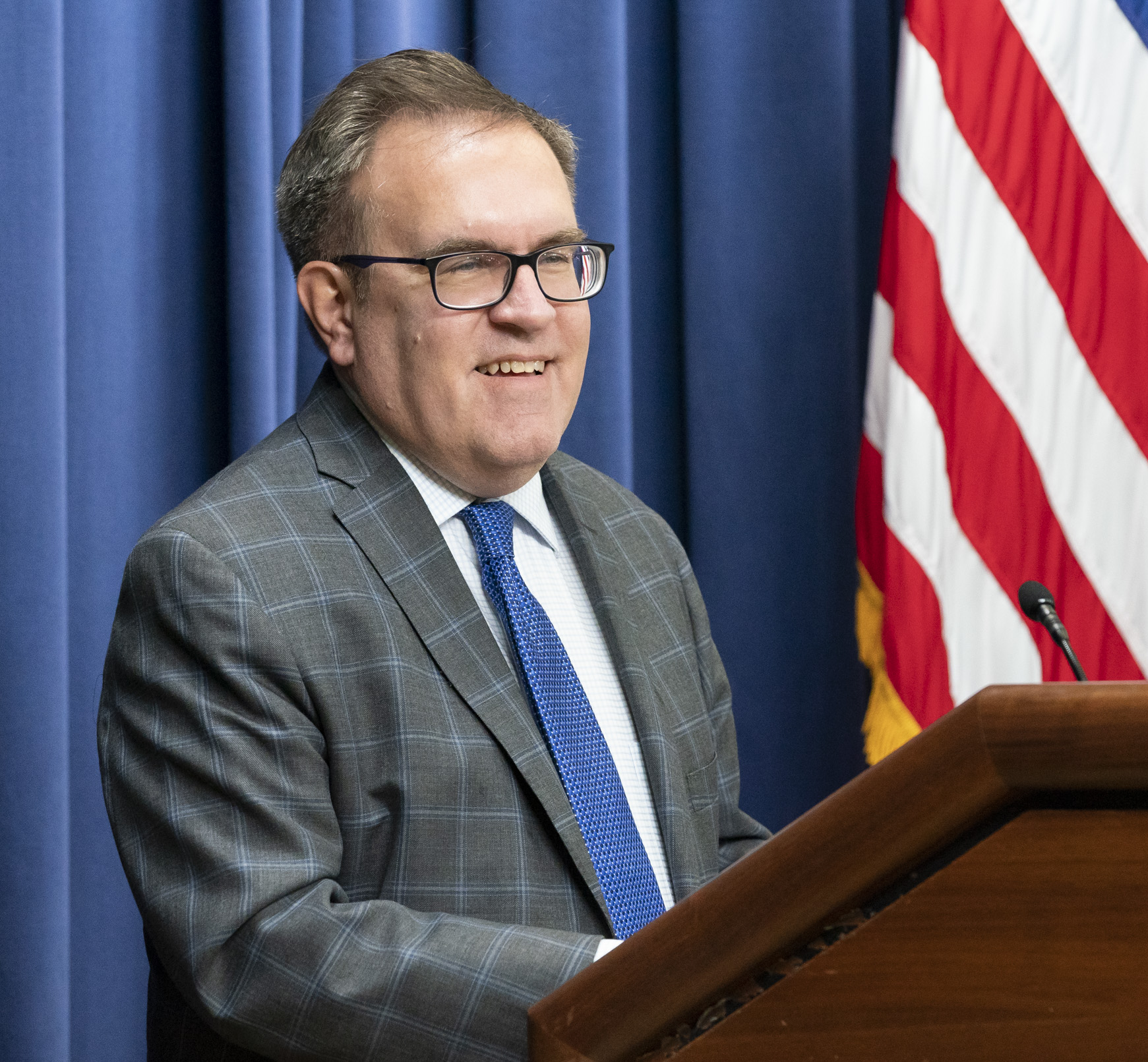
Wheeler speaks in September 2019.

Wheeler's nomination to become head of the EPA was confirmed by the Senate in a 52–47 vote in February 2019, in a largely party-line vote.

In 2019, Wheeler argued in favor of a proposed EPA rule that would prohibit the EPA from using studies that do not make raw data publicly available, a rule first proposed under Wheeler's predecessor, Scott Pruitt. Wheeler framed the proposal as a "transparency" rule; scientists opposed the rule, stating that it would seriously limit the research available to the EPA, because studies do not tend to make personal and confidential information available. The proposal could prevent EPA from using many important studies underpinning various regulations, including regulations on air pollution. The proposed rule was denounced by 69 scientific and medical groups (including the American Lung Association, American Medical Association, and American Psychological Association) and the editors of five leading scientific journals (Nature, Cell, PLOS One, and Proceedings of the National Academy of Sciences). A bipartisan group of former EPA administrators, testifying before the House Energy Subcommittee on Oversight, also criticized proposals to restrict the use of science in EPA decision making. The EPA's Science Advisory Board also pushed back against the proposal.

In September 2019, Wheeler signed a directive to prioritize efforts to reduce animal testing. Instead, the research should focus on new alternative test methods. The goal is to reduce its requests for, and funding of, mammal studies by 30% by 2025 and eliminate all mammal study requests and funding by 2035, though some may still be approved on a case-by-case basis.

In March 2020, during the COVID-19 pandemic in the United States, the EPA declared that for an indefinite amount of time, it would generally not fine companies for violating environment regulations for "routine compliance monitoring [of pollution], integrity testing, sampling, laboratory analysis, training, and reporting or certification obligations", if the EPA agreed that the COVID-19 pandemic caused the violation. Wheeler said that the EPA "recognizes challenges resulting from efforts to protect workers and the public from Covid-19 may directly impact the ability of regulated facilities to meet all federal regulatory requirements."

In April 2020, the EPA declined to raise environmental standards for fine soot pollution (PM 2.5), during a mandated review. A draft scientific assessment by the EPA had estimated that the current standards (12 micrograms per cubic meter) were "associated with 45,000 deaths" per year, but if the standards were raised (9 micrograms per cubic meter), then 12,150 lives would be saved. After the publication of that report, numerous industries, including oil and coal companies, automakers and chemical manufacturers, urged the Trump administration to disregard the findings and not tighten the rule. The draft of the new rule stated Wheeler placed "little weight on quantitative estimates" of deaths caused by fine soot pollution, reported the New York Times.

Also in April 2020, the EPA weakened mercury regulation in the United States by drastically curtailing the health benefits considered in calculations for making future regulations. Wheeler declared that this was an "honest accounting method", while the Trump administration took the stance that mercury cleanup was not "appropriate and necessary".

Wheeler did not enact any rules that reduced air pollution or carbon emissions.

=== Later career ===
In 2022, Governor of Virginia Glenn Youngkin nominated Wheeler to serve as the Virginia secretary of natural resources, but his confirmation vote was tabled by the Virginia Senate by a vote of 19–21. Pursuant to the Virginia Constitution, Wheeler assumed office immediately upon being nominated, and was eligible to continue serving until his nomination expired. After it became clear he had no path to confirmation, Wheeler stepped down on March 15 to serve as a senior advisor to Youngkin, and Deputy Secretary Travis Voyles took over as Acting Secretary. Wheeler was the first Virginia Cabinet nominee to be denied confirmation since 2006.

On July 1, 2022, Youngkin picked Wheeler to be director of his newly created Office of Regulatory Management, in addition to still being a senior advisor. The new office's responsibilities include a goal to cut the state's regulations by 25%.

Wheeler stepped down from his position in the Youngkin administration on March 29, 2024.

On April 2, 2024, the law and lobbying firm Holland & Hart said it hired Wheeler to be a partner and lead its federal affairs business in Washington, D.C.

Hours before Trump's June 27, 2024, debate against President Joe Biden in the 2024 presidential election, Trump posted to social media a set of talking points Wheeler sent him for the debate.

== Environmental views ==
Wheeler published articles in the magazine Law360. In 2010, he questioned the scientific rigor of the Intergovernmental Panel on Climate Change, expressing his impression that the positions of the organization were based more on political worldview than scientific facts. When asked if he accepted the scientific consensus on climate change during his confirmation hearings as deputy director of the EPA, Wheeler answered, "I believe that man has an impact on the climate but what's not completely understood is what the impact is."

In March 2019, Wheeler said he did not believe climate change was an existential threat. His remarks came in the wake of an IPCC report which concluded that if greenhouse gas emissions were not halved by 2030, there would be catastrophic consequences.

Wheeler is Chairman Emeritus of the National Energy Resources Organization. He is Vice President of the Washington Coal Club.

Political offices
Preceded by Robert Perciasepe	Deputy Administrator of the Environmental Protection Agency; 2018–2019	Succeeded by Henry Darwin; Acting
Preceded by Scott Pruitt	Administrator of the Environmental Protection Agency; 2018–2021	Succeeded by Charlotte Bertrand; Acting
