= Donald van der Vaart =

American chemical engineer and lawyer

- Education: University of Cambridge (Ph.D. Eng); North Carolina Central University (J.D.); North Carolina State University (M.S.ChemEng); University of North Carolina at Chapel Hill (B.S.chemistry)
- Occupations: Chemical engineer and lawyer
- Spouse: Sandy

Donald van der Vaart is an American chemical engineer and lawyer who served as Secretary of the North Carolina Department of Environmental Quality (DEQ) from 2015 to 2017. Van der Vaart was the first DEQ secretary to rise through the ranks as a scientist. Van der Vaart was replaced by Michael Regan in 2017.

== Education ==
Van der Vaart received a bachelor's degree in chemistry from the University of North Carolina at Chapel Hill. He went on to receive a Juris Doctor degree from North Carolina Central University and a master's degree in chemical engineering from North Carolina State University. Additionally, van der Vaart holds a doctorate in chemical engineering from the University of Cambridge.

== Career ==
=== Early career ===
Van Der Vaart served as Deputy Secretary and Energy Policy Advisor for North Carolina Department of Environment & Natural Resources. He was a longtime manager in the department before he was named deputy secretary. He has an extensive background in energy, environmental and regulatory work in academia, state government and the private sector. He also worked as an Engineering Supervisor and later a Program Manager for the N.C. Division of Air Quality. His background is in engineering and environmental regulation. He has also worked in the energy and utility sectors. He is an adjunct professor in engineering at N.C. State University, where he also teaches environmental policy and law. His previous work includes scientific research at Virginia Polytechnic Institute and State University and at Research Triangle Institute (now RTI International). He has published numerous technical and legal articles and holds two patents.

=== Secretary of the Department of Environmental Quality (DEQ) ===
Van der Vaart was sworn in as Secretary of the North Carolina Department of Environmental Quality (DEQ_ on 2 January 2015, when Governor Pat McCrory named his predecessor John E. Skvarla to lead the North Carolina Department of Commerce. After the election of Roy Cooper as new Governor of North Carolina, van der Vaart returned to the air quality division where he had extensive experience as a regulator and had previously worked for 20 years as an engineering supervisor and later as program manager.

Van der Vaart was a leading figure in McCrory's administration in the push-back of two dozen U.S. states against EPA regulations which they saw as overreaching. He is an advocate for decentralized regulations which should adhere to a cost-benefit calculation regarding the balance between conservation of the environment and protection of jobs. In March 2015, van der Vaart gave testimony before the House Committee on Energy and the Commerce Subcommittee on Energy and Power regarding legal and cost issues conflicting with the Obama Administration's proposed 111(d) rule for existing power plants. The same month, van der Vaart appeared before the U.S. Senate Committee on Agriculture, Nutrition and Forestry to testify on the impacts of the Obama administration's proposed "Waters of the United States" rule.

At N.C. State University, van der Vaart is an adjunct professor in engineering, and also teaches environmental policy and law. His previous work includes scientific research at Virginia Polytechnic Institute and State University and at Research Triangle Institute (now RTI International).

=== Trump Administration ===
Following the election of Donald Trump as president, van der Vaart was mentioned for a number of roles in his administration. In 2017, he was reportedly considered for the position of Deputy Administrator of the Environmental Protection Agency (EPA), though he ultimately didn't receive the position. In 2018, van der Vaart's name emerged as a potential candidate to lead the Council on Environmental Quality (CEQ), and as a possible replacement for Scott Pruitt to lead the EPA.

=== Appointments ===
On July 1, 2021, N. C. Supreme Court Chief Justice Paul Newby appointed van der Vaart Chief Administrative Law Judge and Director of the N. C. Office of Administrative Hearings.

Four years later, van der Vaart was appointed to the North Carolina Utilities Commission by North Carolina State Treasurer Brad Briner. Van der Vaart resigned in 2026.

== Political positions ==
On 16 November 2016, van der Vaart along with his counterparts from Alabama, Nebraska, North Dakota and West Virginia signed a letter which urged then president-elect Trump to rein in the EPA, which in their view has "run out of control" and "return environmental leadership to the states." The letter did acknowledge that an agency to address environmental needs was necessary, when it stated that "[o]ur country still needs the EPA, but not the EPA of recent years," which has become a danger to the nation's competitiveness on the international market through overregulation.

There, the letter goes on, "we must put an end to the idea that more regulation is always good, and instead allow state and local experts to improve the environment." In a podcast interview released by the John Locke Foundation on 21 September 2015, he discussed what he titled as "EPA Intrusion: The Federal Power Grab Over North Carolina’s Environment."

== Personal life ==
Van der Vaart is father of two sons and lives with his wife Sandy in Raleigh, North Carolina.
