= Bradley M. Campbell =

American lawyer

Bradley Campbell
- Born: 1961 (age 64–65); Philadelphia, Pennsylvania, U.S.
- Education: Amherst College; University of Chicago
- Political party: Democratic

Bradley McAllerton Campbell (born March 24, 1961) is an American attorney and political figure. He has served at senior levels in the United States Environmental Protection Agency (EPA) and as commissioner of the New Jersey Department of Environmental Protection (NJDEP). He is currently the President of Conservation Law Foundation (CLF), an advocacy nonprofit that forges lasting solutions to the environmental challenges for the people of New England.

Campbell was born in Northeast Philadelphia. His Lebanese family had adopted the surname "Campbell" as an American version of its family name Kamel and his father gave him the middle name "McAllerton" to make him sound as Americanized as possible. His father died when Bradley was eight years old, so he was raised by Jewish stepfathers and an uncle; he would say in jest that his "aspiration is to become ambassador-at-large in the Middle East". He attended the Friends' Central School and learned to sail during summers spent at the Echo Hill Outdoor School. Campbell earned his undergraduate degree from Amherst College in 1983 and was awarded a J.D. degree from the University of Chicago Law School, where he was an editor of the University of Chicago Law Review. After graduating he was a law clerk for United States Court of Appeals for the District of Columbia Circuit Judge Carl E. McGowan. He entered private practice as an attorney at the firm of Rogovin, Huge & Schiller, working on civil and criminal litigation, representing environmental organizations in the Chesapeake Bay watershed.

Campbell served on the White House Council on Environmental Quality, overseeing executive office policy on issues including agricultural policy, brownfield land and Superfund sites. At the United States Department of Justice, he was lead counsel in the case Kelley v. EPA on lender liability which reaffirmed the obligation of polluters to cover the costs of cleaning up Superfund sites.

In 1993, Campbell received the Arthur S. Flemming Award for distinguished government service, which is based on a national competition. He was also chosen that year to receive the John Marshall Award, the highest level of recognition granted by the Department of Justice.

Campbell was nominated by President Clinton on December 15, 1999, to serve as the Regional Administrator of EPA's Middle Atlantic Region succeeding W. Michael McCabe, who had been named Deputy Administrator. As regional administrator, in cooperation with governors and senior state officials, Campbell directed the implementation of federal environmental programs in the states of Delaware, Maryland, Pennsylvania, Virginia, West Virginia, and the District of Columbia.

Campbell took office as head of NJDEP in January 2002, having been nominated to the post by Governor Jim McGreevey. In October 2004 Senator Anthony Bucco of Morris County invoked senatorial courtesy to block four nominations to the Highlands Commission. Bucco sought to register his concern about how the Highlands Water Protection and Planning Act would limit development in the New Jersey Highlands, and dropped his block after Campbell met with Bucco, Assemblyman Guy R. Gregg and the mayors of several municipalities in Morris County, with Bucco saying "All I wanted was my day in court".

After his appointment to NJDEP, Campbell moved to Lambertville, New Jersey, where he lives with his wife, artist Katherine Hackl.

Since resigning as Commissioner of NJDEP in 2006, he has worked as an attorney and consultant specializing in issues related to the environment, energy, entrepreneurship, and science. Campbell became President of the Conservation Law Foundation on September 8, 2015.
