= Tom Alberg =

American lawyer and businessman (1940–2022)

- Born: February 12, 1940; San Francisco, California, U.S.
- Died: August 5, 2022 (aged 82)
- Education: Harvard University; Columbia Law School
- Occupations: Founder and managing partner of Madrona Venture Group
- Spouses: Mary Ann Johnke (m. 1963; div. 1989); Judy Beck (m. 1989)
- Children: 5

Thomas Austin Alberg (February 12, 1940 – August 5, 2022) was an American lawyer and businessman, founder and managing partner of the venture capital firm Madrona Venture Group, and a director of Amazon.com from 1996 to 2019. In addition to investing in many high tech startups, he was one of the earliest investors in Amazon. At Madrona, some of Alberg's investments included Impinj, a RFID technology start-up, online real estate brokerage Redfin, business management as-a-service provider Apptio and Isilon Systems, a storage software provider which was later acquired by the Emc Corporation.

== Early life ==
Alberg was born on February 12, 1940, in San Francisco, California, the son of Thomas Alberg and Miriam Twitchell Alberg. His grandfather had immigrated from Sweden. Alberg grew up in Seattle, Washington where he attended Ballard High School. During this time he also worked at the family farm in Carnation. He studied at Harvard University, where he received a BA in International Affairs in 1962. He then studied at Columbia Law School, where he received a JD degree in 1965.

== Career ==
Alberg started his career in 1965 with Cravath, Swaine & Moore, a New York–based law firm, after graduating from Columbia. He returned to Seattle in 1967 and joined Perkins Coie, a law firm based in the city. He went on to become the chair of the executive committee and served Boeing, Alaska Airlines, and other clients in the high-tech industry. During his time with the firm, he led the shift from public offerings toward private investments and venture capital, helping the firm focus on the emerging technology companies in the region. His work with Advanced Technology Labs, an ultrasound imaging technology company was a step in this direction.

He joined McCaw Cellular in 1990 as an executive vice president, having been recruited by the then chairman Craig McCaw. In the mid-1990s, he quit McCaw after it was acquired by AT&T. After acting as an advisor to the board and being part of the negotiating team during this time, he quit the combined entity in 1995. He then partnered with William Ruckelshaus, who had earlier served as the administrator of the Environmental Protection Agency, to form Madrona Venture Group, a venture capital firm headquartered in Seattle. Some of the investments by Madrona included Impinj, a RFID technology start-up, online real estate brokerage Redfin, business management as-a-service provider Apptio and Isilon Systems, a storage software provider which was later acquired by the Emc Corporation.

Alberg was noted for his association with Jeff Bezos and Amazon, where he was one of the earliest investors after being introduced to Bezos in 1995 by a friend. While he loved physical bookstores, it is noted that he was convinced by Bezos' online store after he failed to find a book by management consultant Peter Drucker in his neighborhood bookstore. He started with an investment of $50,000 in the company and partnered in convincing twenty-two other investors to raise a total of $1 million. The other early investors included both Bezos' parents and Alberg's parents. Alberg joined the company's board in 1996, and by mid-1999, he was noted to have made at least $21 million on the investment. He stepped down from the board in 2019 after serving for 23 years.

Alberg set up Oxbow Farms, a conservation center spread over 240 acres along the Snoqualmie River on land that was handed down to him by his father in Carnation, Washington. The non-profit organization focused on sustainable agriculture methods for growing food. He also was the founder of Novelty Hill Winery in Woodinville, Washington which he founded with winemaker Mike Januik. He also owned a vineyard in Royal City, Washington. In the late 2010s and early 2020s, Alberg shifted his focus toward urban planning, and tackling the problem of homelessness and affordable housing. During this period, he also wrote his book Flywheels: How Cities Are Creating Their Own Futures (2021), which focused on Seattle's technology-led urban renaissance and how it can serve as a template for other cities seeking to emerge as innovation hubs. Alberg was an investor in local journalism efforts focused in the Pacific Northwest including Seattle Weekly's Eastside Week and The New Pacific. Crosscut, an online news website that he started with venture capitalist David Brewster later merged with KCTS 9 to form the non profit Cascade Public Media.

Alberg was made a member of then-US President Barack Obama's National Advisory Council on Innovation and Entrepreneurship in 2009. In 2015, Alberg received the Lifetime Achievement Award at Seattle Business Magazine's Tech Impact Awards. His work with Madrona Venture Group and Amazon.com were noted. Alberg also helped start the Paul G. Allen School of Computer Science and Engineering at the University of Washington and also worked with former Washington state governor Christine Gregoire to set up Challenge Seattle, a non-profit that allowed business and technology leaders to contribute towards solving civic issues in the region.

== Personal life ==
Alberg married Mary Ann Johnke, a physics professor, in 1963. The couple had three children. The marriage ended in a divorce in 1989. He married Judi Beck the same year and remained married until his death. The couple had two children. He was an avid sailor and a winemaker.

Alberg died on August 5, 2022, at the age of 82, approximately one year after a stroke.

== Published works ==
- Alberg, Tom (November 2, 2021). Flywheels: How Cities Are Creating Their Own Futures. New York: Columbia University Press. ISBN 978-0-231-55318-6. OCLC 1331413788.
