= Senator Ruckelshaus =

Senator Ruckelshaus may refer to:

- John C. Ruckelshaus (1930–2015), Indiana State Senate
- John Ruckelshaus (fl. 1990s–2010s), Indiana State Senate
