= Alberg =

Alberg is a surname. Notable people with the surname include:

- Carl Alberg (1900–1986), ship engineer and sailboat constructor
- Ifrish Alberg (born 1988), Surinamese sprinter
- Mary Alberg, American physicist, married to Tom
- Mildred Freed Alberg (1921-2002), American producer
- Petur Alberg (1885–1940), Faroese violinist, composer, and author
- Roland Alberg (born 1990), Dutch footballer
- Tom Alberg (1940–2022), American lawyer and businessman, married to Mary
