= Lubbers (surname) =

Lubbers is a Dutch patronymic surname ("Lubbert's son"). People with this name include:

- Arend Lubbers (born 1931), American educator
- Bob Lubbers (1922–2017), American comic strip and comic book artist
- Eva Lubbers (born 1992), Dutch sprinter and high jumper
- Reinder Lubbers (born 1984), Dutch rower
- Rudie Lubbers (born 1945), Dutch Olympic boxer
- Ruud Lubbers (1939–2018), Prime Minister of the Netherlands from 1982 to 1994
- Steven Lubbers (born 1953), Dutch cricketer
- Teresa Lubbers (born 1939), American (Indiana) state senator

== See also ==
- Hartford City Glass Company, contains a description of the John H. Lubbers glassblowing machine
- Lubber, a species of grasshopper
- Marinus van der Lubbe
