= Roamer of Switzerland =

Swiss watchmaker

Roamer, AG
- Type: Private
- Industry: Watch manufacturing
- Founded: 1888
- Founder: Fritz Meyer
- Headquarters: Wallbach, Aargau, Switzerland
- Key people: Christian Frommherz (CEO)
- Products: Watches
- Parent: Chungnam Group of Companies
- Website: www.roamer.ch

Roamer is a Swiss manufacturer of luxury watches, based in Wallbach, Switzerland. Founded in 1888 by Fritz Meyer, the company initially manufactured cylinder escapements. It developed its first calibre in 1895 following a surge of employees, and, as of 2002, Roamer is a member of the Federation of the Swiss Watch Industry FH. In 2026, Roamer partnered with Titan Company, resulting in the company entering the Indian market.

== History ==
Roamer was founded in 1888 in Solothurn, Switzerland by Fritz Meyer, who registered the company two years later, and as a watch manufacturer in 1899.

The company originally concentrated on manufacturing cylinder escapements. Within seven years, the company grew to sixty employees and started producing complete watches. In 1895, the company developed its first calibre and named it "Number 38" to commemorate Meyer's 38th birthday.

In 1905, Meyer joined fellow watchmaker Johann Stüdeli to form the partnership Meyer and Stüdeli (MST), which continued to develop new calibres.

The earliest identified watch is an unmarked lady's pocket watch containing an MST 41 cylinder escapement that has London silver hallmarks for 1908.

In 1917, they purchased fellow Solothurn watchmaker L. Tieche Gammeter (LTG). In 1918, the partnership incorporated Meyer & Stuedeli SA into the company.

By 1923, production grew to one million units. The jewelled lever-escapement watches were sold under the brand "Roamer", which LTG registered 15 years prior.

Cylinder, and later pin-lever, watches were sold under the brands Medana and Meda. In 1932, the company started its own dial production line.

In 1952, Meyer and Stuedeli officially changed its name to Roamer Watch Co. SA. In 1955, Roamer patented the Anfibio watertight watchcase, which proved to be a commercial success. The company launched its first quartz movement in 1972.

In 2002, Roamer became a member of the Federation of the Swiss Watch Industry FH. The following year, Roamer returned to manufacturing mechanical watches.

To mark its 125th anniversary in 2013, the company launched a limited-edition Stingray Chrono Diver.

Christian Frommherz, who had served as CEO since 2003, acquired the brand in 2018.

Expansion of the C-Line collection continued in 2020 with the introduction of the C-Line Automatic. With the 120th anniversary of its first in-house MST movement approaching, Roamer began developing an updated version, the MST 2.0, and in 2024 released the Mechano, the first watch powered by this calibre. In 2025, Roamer introduced the first solar-powered dial watch, the Helios Power.

=== Outside of Switzerland ===
Roamer has seen business outside of Switzerland since 1945, when a representative office opened in New York City. The company sells its products to over 70 countries; as of 2024, Roamer watches have been circulated in Dhaka under the Bangladeshi watch distributor Saco Watch Co., and the brand was featured in the Port City Duty Free Mall in Colombo, Sri Lanka, the following year. Due to a partnership with Titan Company, Roamer entered India, where Bollywood actor Arjun Rampal represents the company, in May 2026. Frommherz decided that Roamer's Indian branch should be based in Bengaluru.

== Gallery ==
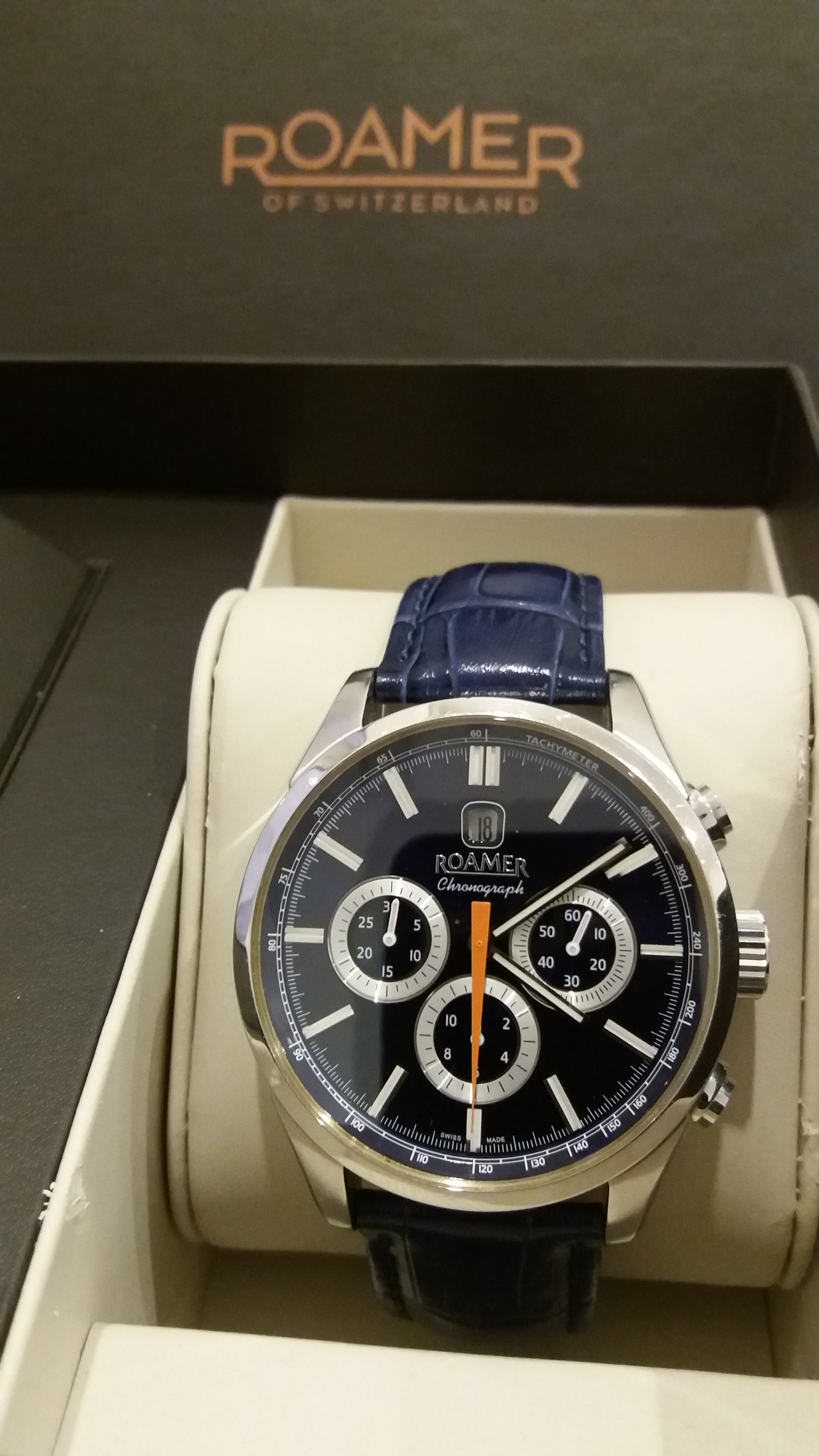
Roamer Competence La Grande Chronograph, equipped with the unique Dubois Dépraz 2025 chronograph module

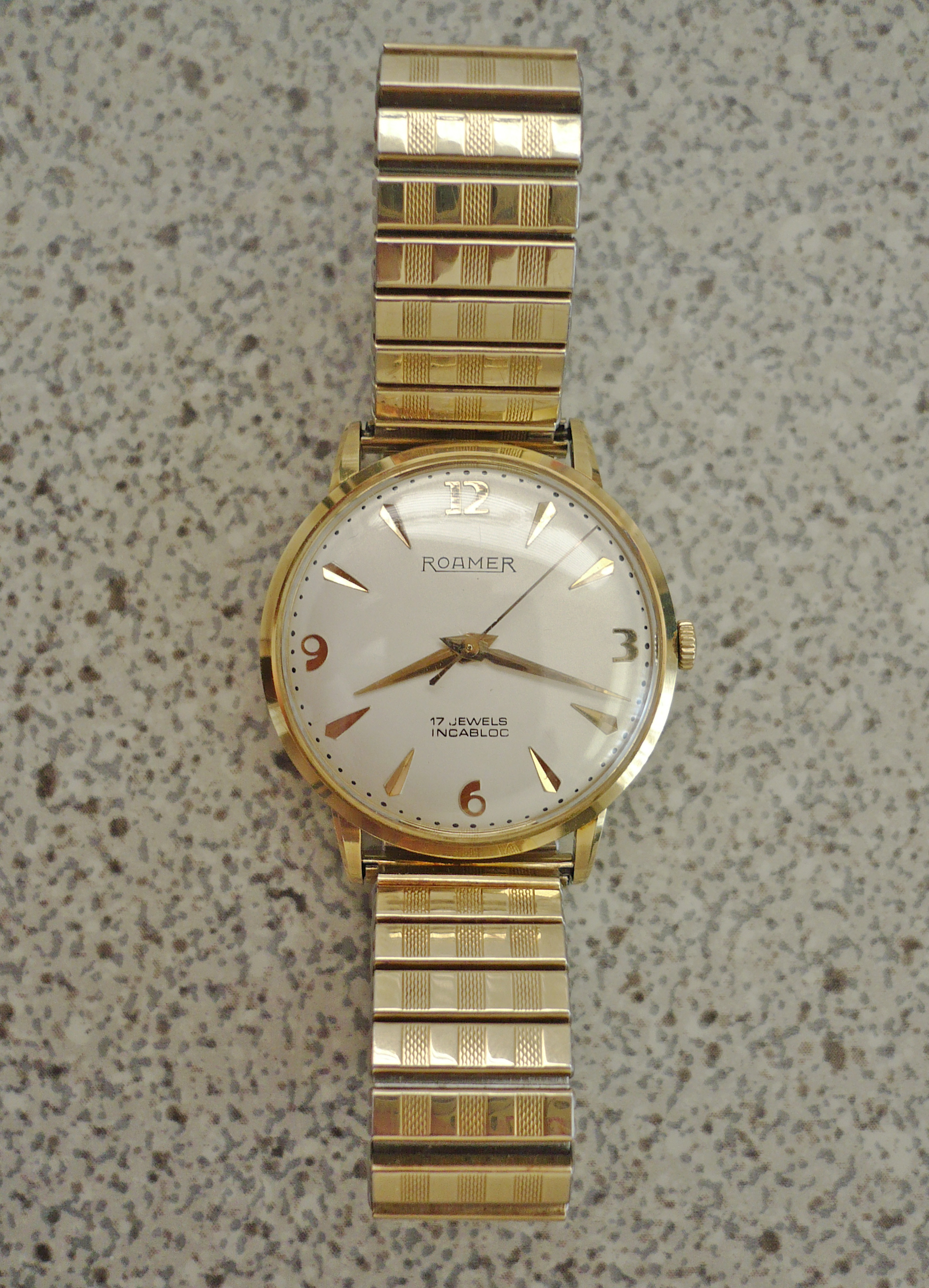
Roamer Premier (1961)

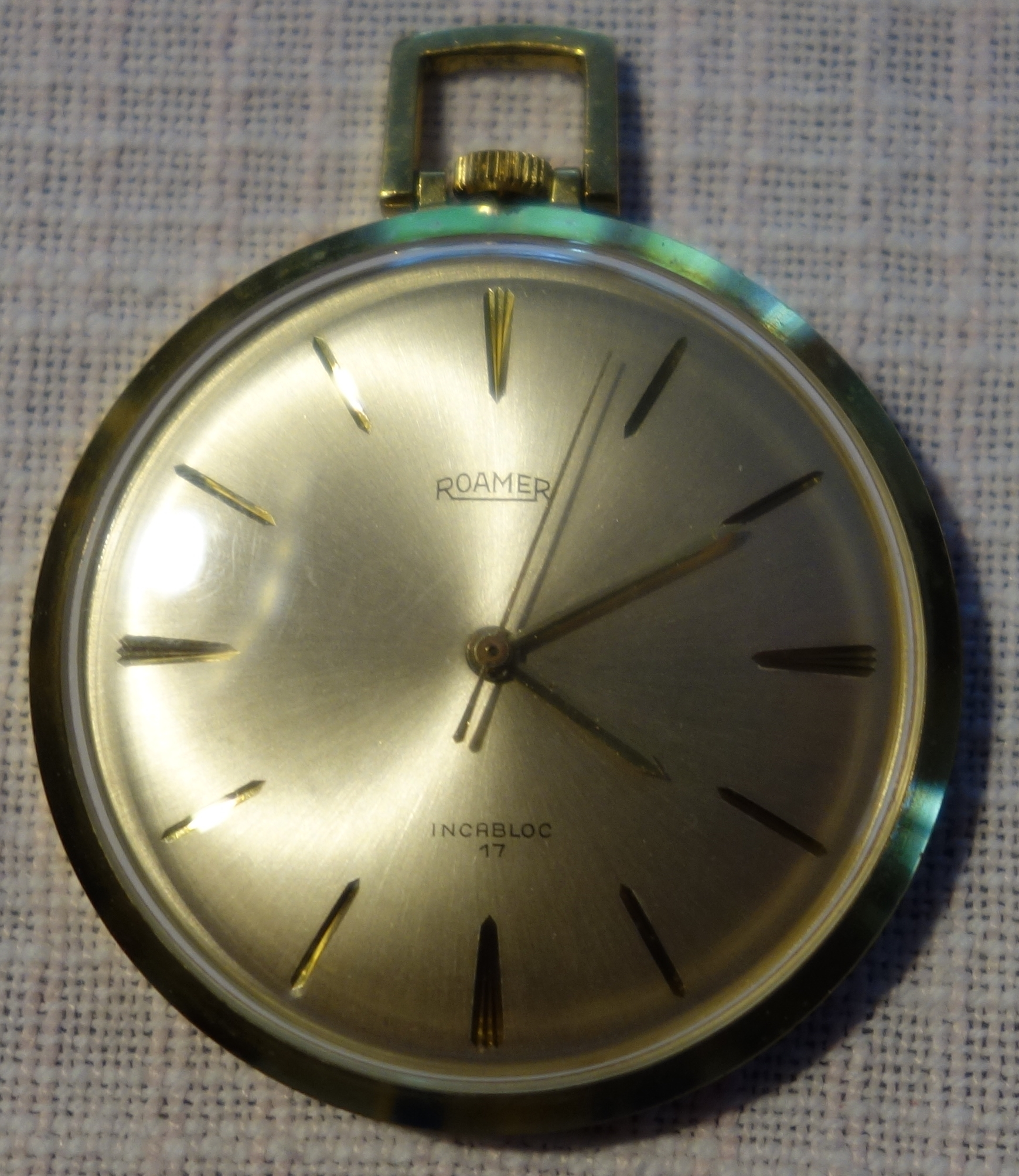
Roamer gold-plated pocket watch (1966)
