= Madrona Venture Group =

American venture capital firm

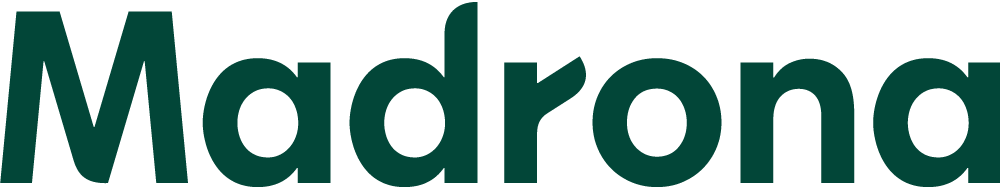
- Type: Private
- Industry: Venture capital
- Founded: 1995; 31 years ago
- Founders: Tom Alberg; Paul Goodrich; Gerald Grinstein; William Ruckelshaus
- Headquarters: Seattle, Washington, US
- Website: madrona.com

Madrona Venture Group is an American venture capital firm, founded in 1995 and based in Seattle, Washington. Madrona specializes in seed, startup, Series A and early stage investments.

== Company ==
Madrona was founded in 1995 by Tom Alberg, Paul Goodrich, Gerald Grinstein, and William Ruckelshaus. Madrona has invested in the information technology sector including consumer internet commercial software and services, cloud computing, digital media and advertising, wireless, networking, mobile, and infrastructure sectors. As of 2015, more than 90% of the firms investments were in companies based in the Pacific Northwest.

In 2012, Madrona raised a $300 million fund.

In 2014, Madrona Venture Group launched a startup studio, Madrona Venture Labs, as an in-house startup incubator.

In 2018, Madrona raised Madrona Fund VII of $300 million.

In October 2020, Madrona Venture Group invested in Temporal, a Seattle-based company that is developing microservice orchestration platform.

At the end of 2020, the Group announced that it had raised over $500 million in new capital. Over $345 million of that figure was raised for its eighth fund, its largest to date, and $161 million for a second later-stage fund.

In September 2022, Madrona Venture Group raised its largest fund ever, $690 million.

Companies invested in include Apptio, Impinj, Redfin, The Riveter, Rover.com, and Smartsheet.
