= Alvin L. Alm =

American environmental regulator (1937–2000)

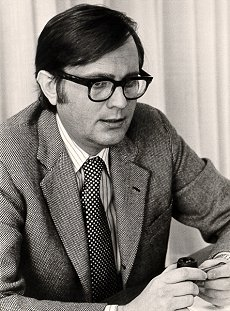
EPA Deputy Administrator Alvin L. Alm

Alvin "Al" Alm (January 27, 1937 – July 24, 2000) was an Assistant Administrator for Planning and Management for the Environmental Protection Agency (EPA), and was one of the leading figures in environmental regulation in the United States.

== Early life ==
The son of a Swedish immigrant tailor, Alm grew up in Denver where he was fond of fishing and other outdoors activities. After graduating from the University of Denver, attended the Maxwell School of Citizenship and Public Affairs of Syracuse University in 1960. Upon graduating, he interned at the Bureau of the Budget, where he was first introduced to the budgeting process for pollution programs throughout the government.

In 1970, Russell Train, of the recently created Council on Environmental Quality, asked Alm to become his staff director. Alm accepted, and three years later was asked by William Ruckelshaus, the EPA director, to become the Assistant Administrator for Planning and Management for the newly created EPA. Soon after Alm arrived at EPA, Ruckelshaus left for the position of FBI director, and Russell Train became the next EPA Administrator.

== Career ==
Alm developed the effluent guideline process, the NPDES permit program, and created financial safeguards for the construction grant program. He was responsible for the economic-analysis program of the EPA, to ensure that the agency would minimize the negative economic impact of its regulations.

By the mid 1970s, Alm was deeply involved in all energy issues. The agency's mandate received less attention due to the rapid increase in prices resulting from the OPEC oil embargo of 1973–1974. He was invited to Camp David by President Ford to help create his administration's energy policy. Due to his achievements, he gained a seat in the Carter administration, first working under James Schlesinger on Carter's energy policy, and then as the Assistant Secretary for Policy and Evaluation at the newly created Department of Energy. He was considered an expert on budgeting, economics, and regulation.

In 1979, Alm became the director of Harvard University's energy security program. After the resignation of Ronald Reagan's first EPA Administrator Ann Gorsuch, William Ruckelshaus returned to the agency, and called for Al Alm to serve the Agency as Deputy Administrator. Ruckelshaus and Alm served through Reagan's first term, and then both left the government for the private sector after successfully stabilizing the agency. Alm became the senior vice president of Science Applications International Corporation, Inc. in McLean, VA.

His final notable achievement in the government was creating a 10-year plan to clean up the nuclear dumps of the nation; a task that was thought to take nearly 70 years. After this achievement, he began work at Chambers Associates, a policy consulting company.

== Death ==
Alm died on July 24, 2000, due to heart failure in Virginia.

== Legacy ==
Alm was one of the most influential characters in creating the government's campaign to control and limit environmental degradation. Before his work, the Federal government had almost no effective pollution control system; after his career, the government has fully functional regulations and agencies to promote environmental conservation. Alm and his colleagues curbed the widespread trend of degradation of the American environment, and laid a foundation for future environmental progress. His impact on environmental regulation and policy far exceeds the scope of his life and his name recognition.
