= John Ruckelshaus =

American politician

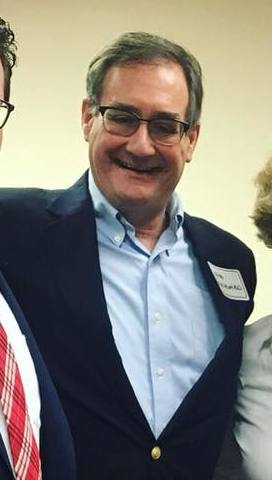

Member of the Indiana Senate from the 30th district
- In office November 9, 2016 – November 9, 2020
- Preceded by: Scott Schneider
- Succeeded by: Fady Qaddoura

Member of the Indiana House of Representatives from the 49th district
- In office November 7, 1990 – November 4, 1992
- Preceded by: Bill Spencer
- Succeeded by: Phillip Warner

Personal details
- Born: John Christian Ruckelshaus III
- Party: Republican
- Spouse: Mary
- Children: 3
- Relatives: John C. Ruckelshaus (father); William Ruckelshaus (uncle)
- Education: Indiana University Bloomington (BA)

John Christian Ruckelshaus III is an American, conservative politician who served in the Indiana House of Representatives from 1990 to 1992 and the Indiana Senate from 2016 to 2020 as a Republican. He ran in the Republican primary for Indiana Senate District 29 in the 2026 midterm elections. He won the primary in May 2026 and will now face Democrat Kristina Moorhead in the November general election.

== Biography ==
Ruckelshaus is a Republican politician who was a member of the Indiana Senate representing the 30th district where he served from 2016 to 2020. He previously served in the Indiana House of Representatives from 1990 to 1992 from the 49th district. He ran when incumbent State Representative Bill Spencer retired. Ruckelshaus ran for the State Senate in 1992, but lost the Republican primary to Teresa Lubbers. He was succeeded by Phillip T. Warner in the 49th district. Ruckelshaus previously served as the Deputy Commissioner of the Indiana Department of Workforce Development for Government Affairs from 2006 to 2008. He replaced Deputy Commissioner Anne Valentine after she retired. He was replaced by Michelle Marshel. Ruckelshaus previously served as a Member of the Washington Township Marion County Advisory Board from 1986 to 1990. Ruckelshaus is the nephew of William Ruckelshaus, the former Deputy Attorney General under President Richard Nixon and the former Administrator of the Environmental Protection Agency under Nixon and President Ronald Reagan. His father John C. Ruckelshaus also served in the Indiana Senate.
