= 1976 Republican Party vice presidential candidate selection =

1976 Republican vice presidential nomination
- August 19, 1976
| Nominee | Bob Dole |
| Home state | Kansas |
Previous Vice Presidential nominee
Spiro Agnew
Vice Presidential nominee
Bob Dole

This article lists those who were potential candidates for the Republican nomination for Vice President of the United States in the 1976 election. At the 1976 Republican National Convention, incumbent President Gerald Ford narrowly won the presidential nomination over former California Governor Ronald Reagan. Ford had decided not to choose incumbent Vice President Nelson Rockefeller as his running mate, due to Rockefeller's unpopularity with the right wing of the Republican Party and Rockefeller wanting to retire from politics all together, which probably hurt his campaign for doing so. He instead chose Senator Bob Dole of Kansas. Dole was acceptable to the conservative wing of the party, and Ford hoped that Dole would help the ticket win the western states and the agricultural vote. The Ford–Dole ticket ultimately lost to the Carter–Mondale ticket in the general election.

Though he would not win the presidential nomination, Reagan announced before the convention that he would pick Senator Richard Schweiker of Pennsylvania as his running mate. Dole went on to become Senate Republican leader, and the Republican presidential nominee in 1996 but ultimately lost to incumbent President Bill Clinton in the general election.

== Potential candidates ==
=== Nominee ===
Senator
Bob Dole
from Kansas
(1969–1996)

=== Other potential candidates ===
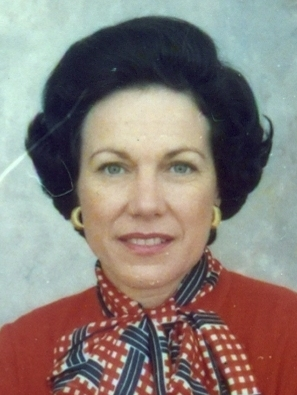
Ambassador
Anne Armstrong
from Texas
(1976–1977)

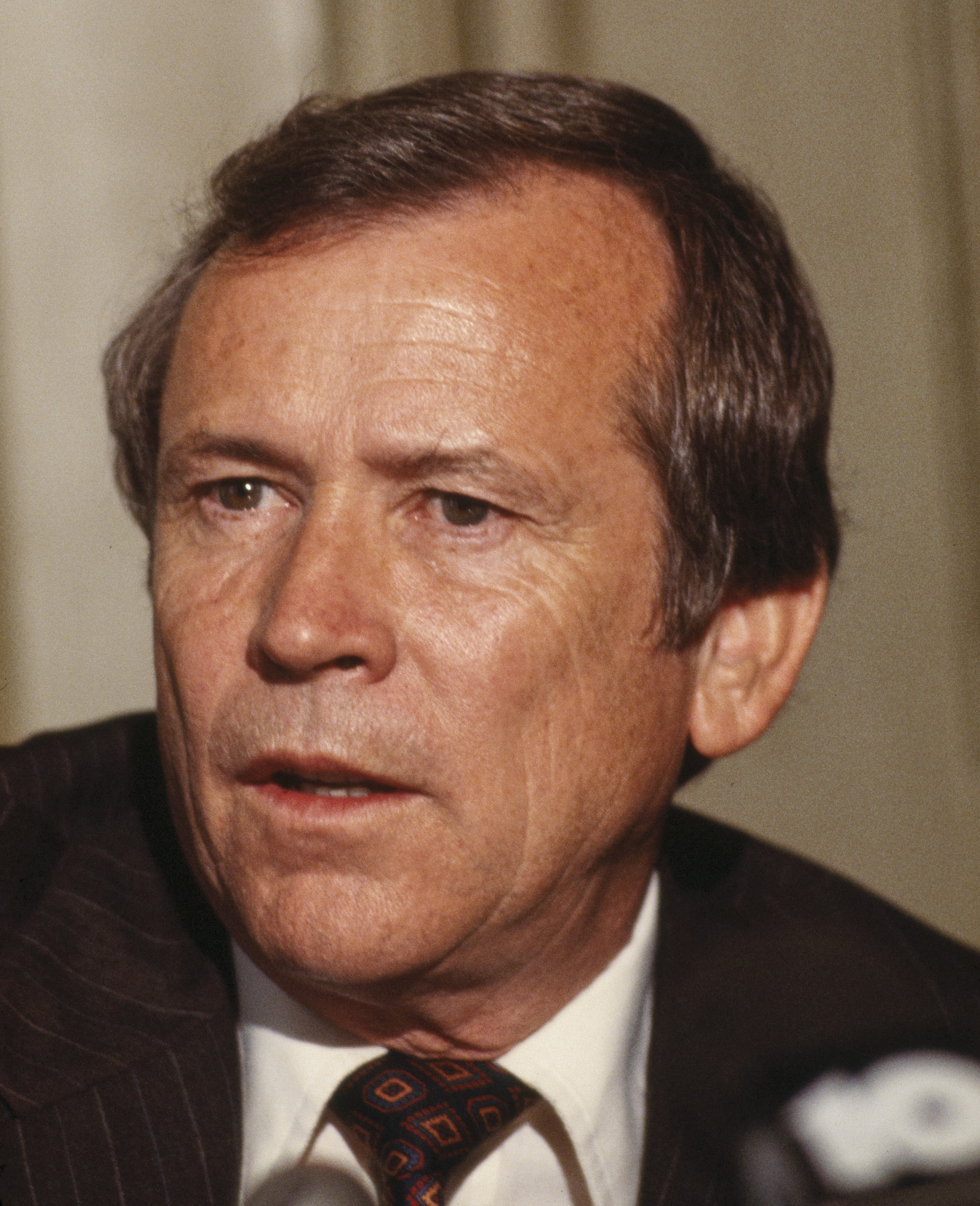
Senator
Howard Baker
from Tennessee
(1967–1985)

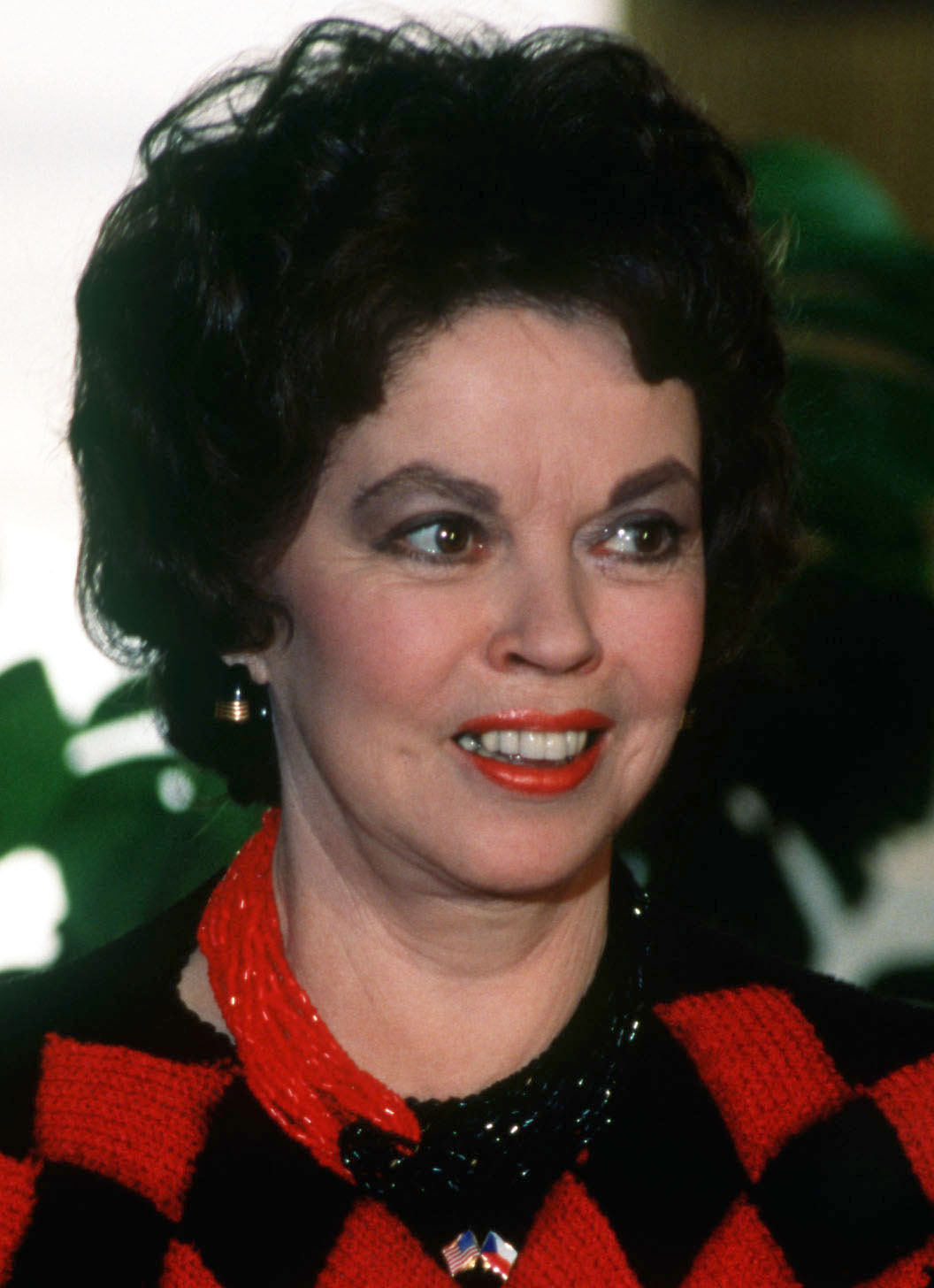
Ambassador
Shirley Temple Black
from California
(1974–1976)

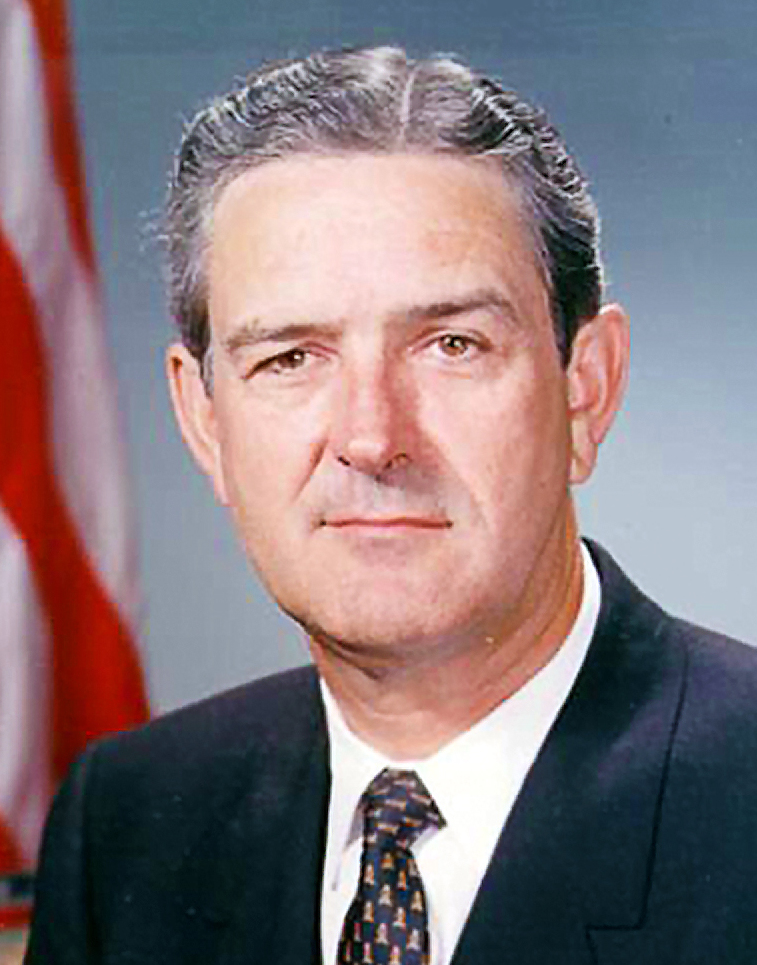
Former Secretary of the Treasury
John Connally
from Texas
(1971–1972)

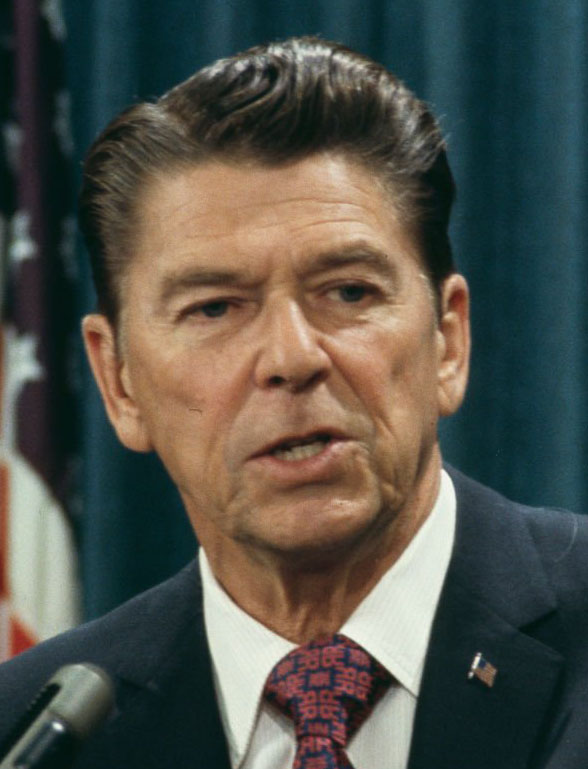
Former Governor
Ronald Reagan
of California
(1967–1975)

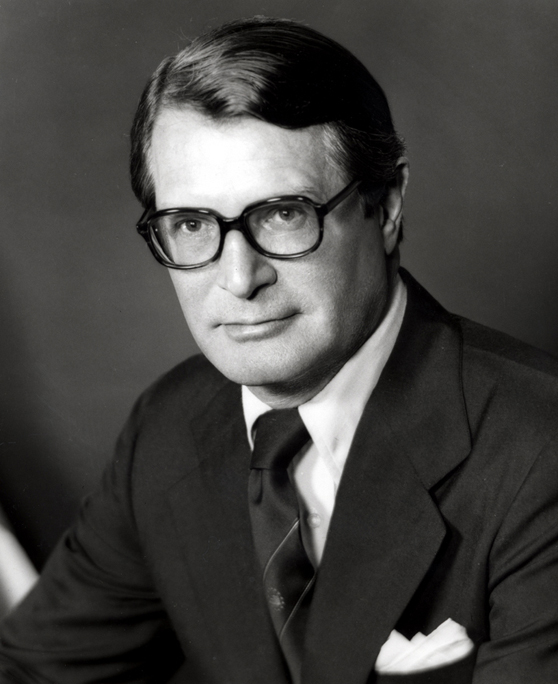
Secretary of Commerce
Elliot Richardson
from Massachusetts
(1976–1977)

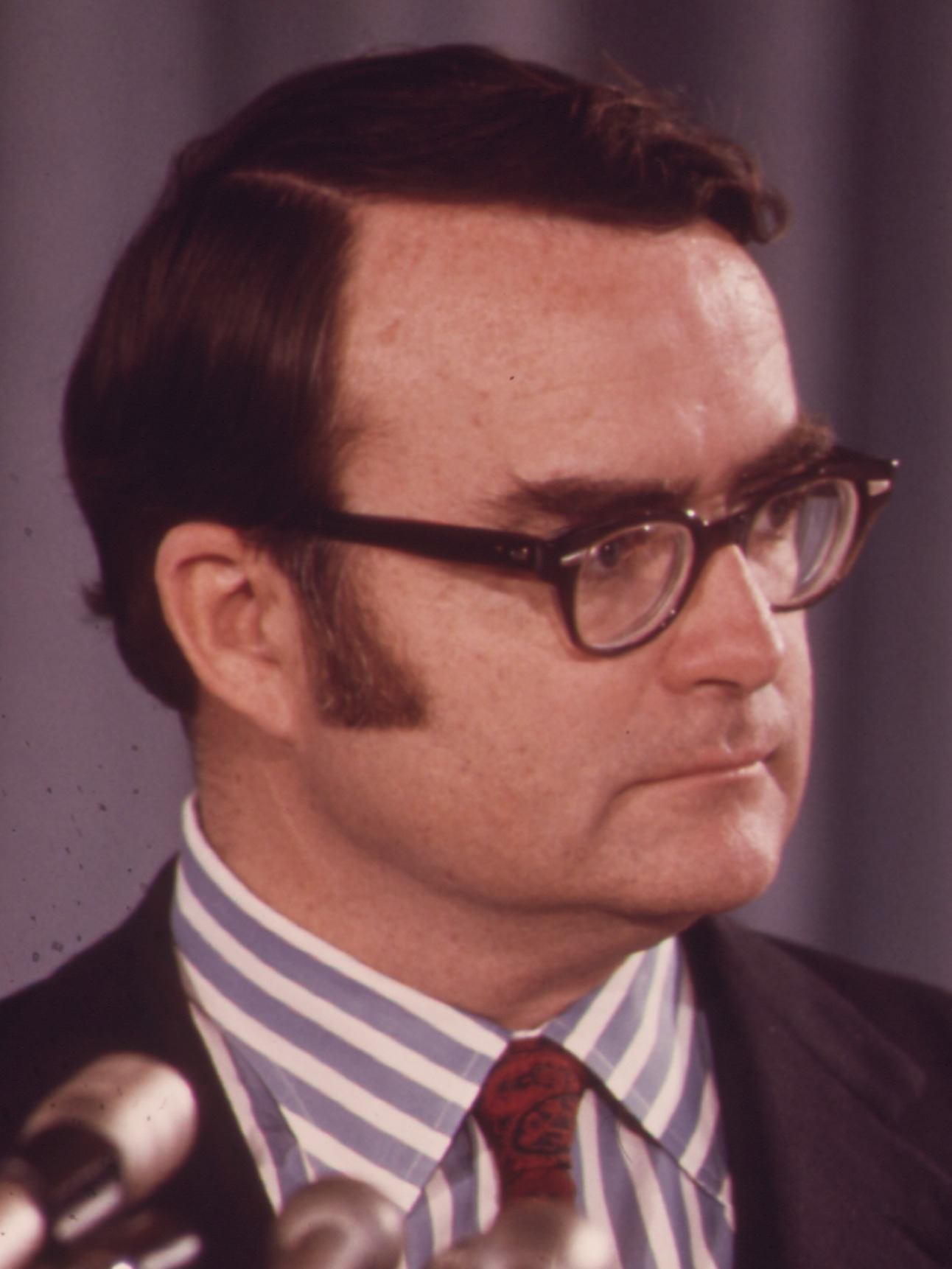
Former Deputy Attorney General
William Ruckelshaus
from Washington
(1973)

Secretary of Treasury
William E. Simon
from California
(1974–1977)

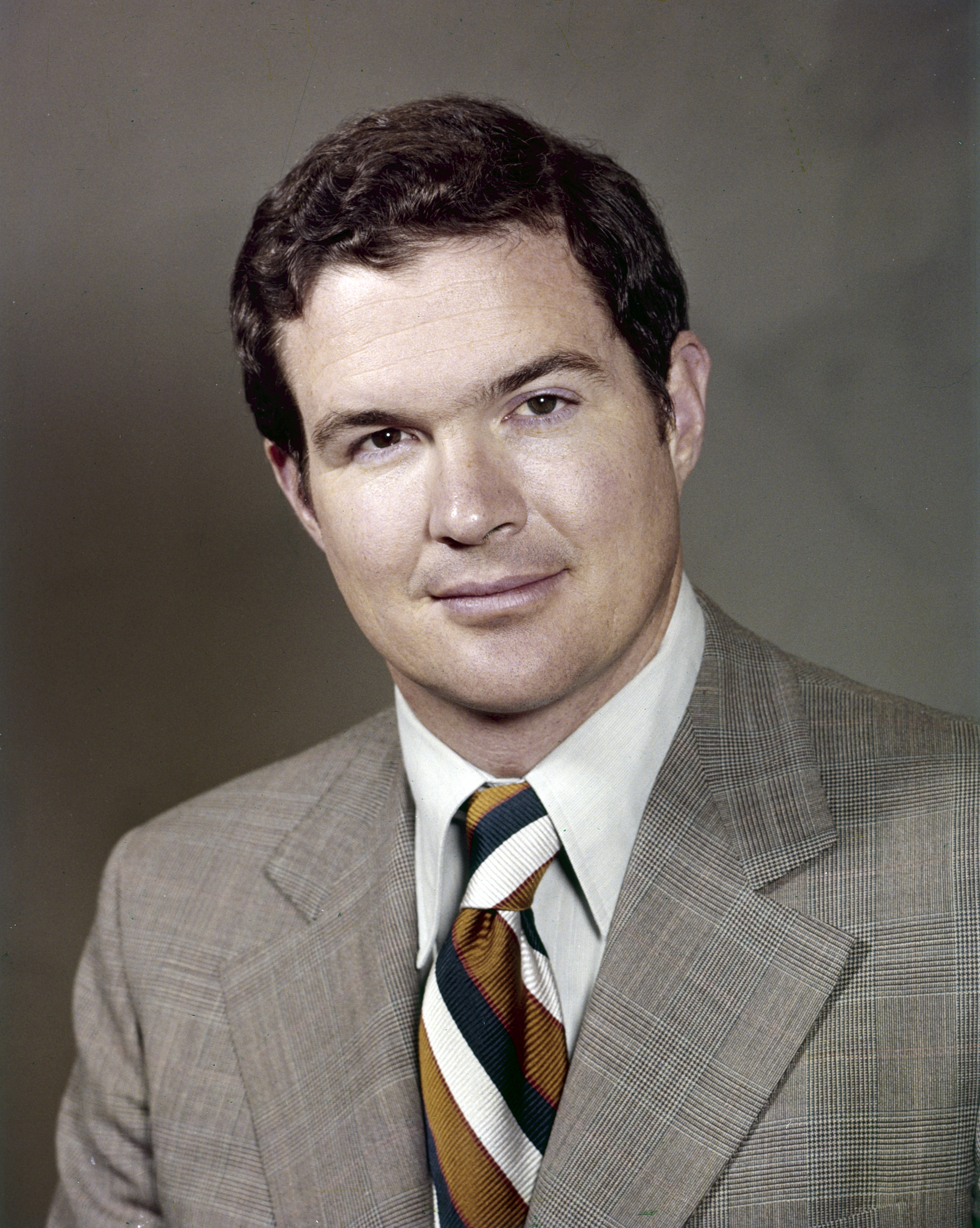
Governor
Kit Bond
of Missouri
(1973–1977)

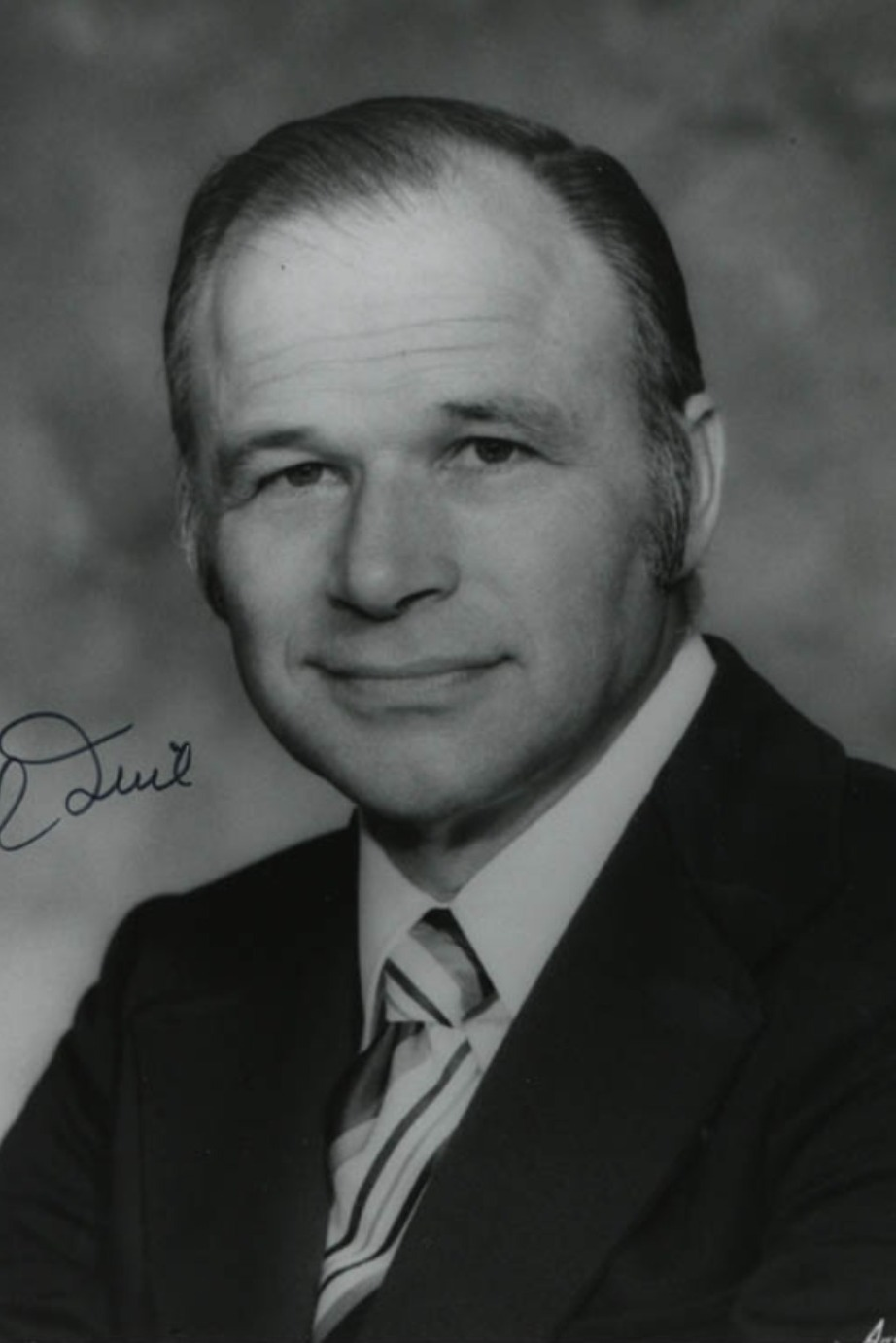
Congressman
Al Quie
from Minnesota
(1958–1979)

== See also ==
- Gerald Ford 1976 presidential campaign
- 1976 Republican Party presidential primaries
- 1976 Republican National Convention
- 1976 United States presidential election
- List of United States major party presidential tickets
