= Digital Fuel =

- Type: Private
- Industry: Software as a service
- Founded: 2000
- Founder: Ben Lehmann; Israel Dancziger; Gilad Raz; Yakov Kogan
- Headquarters: Los Angeles, CA, United states
- Parent: VMware (2011-2016) Skyview LLC (2016-2018) Apptio (2018-current)

Digital Fuel is a provider of IT financial management software. The company's headquarters is in Los Angeles, California.

== History ==
Digital Fuel was co-founded in 2000 by Benny Lehmann, Israel Dancziger, Gilad Raz and Yakov Kogan who served as the company's CEO, CTO, and vice president of engineering, respectively. Digital Fuel's ServiceFlow software was originally sold to corporate IT teams and to service providers to help them manage service level agreements (SLAs) for outsourcing agreements.

In 2008, Digital Fuel expanded its product line to include IT financial management tools.

Digital Fuel has raised over $30m in funding from investors including Apax Partners, Benchmark Capital, Israel Seed Partners, and Sigma Partners.

In June 2011, VMware purchased Digital Fuel for $85 million.

In September 2016, Skyview Capital acquired Digital Fuel from VMware.

In February 2018, Apptio, Inc. acquired Digital Fuel from Skyview Capital.

== See also ==
- IT cost transparency
- IT service management
