= Fady Qaddoura =

American politician

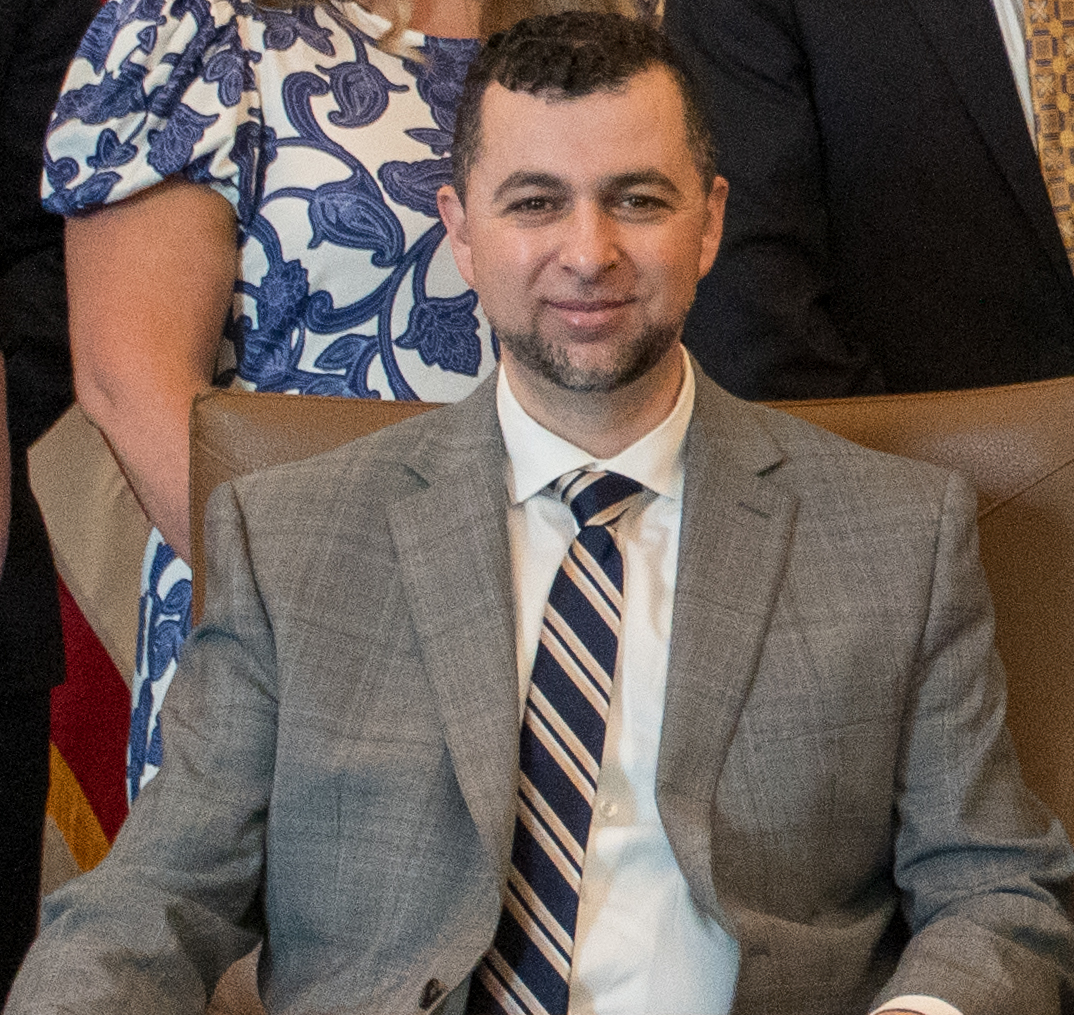

Member of the Indiana Senate from the 30th district
- Incumbent
- Assumed office November 9, 2020
- Preceded by: John Ruckelshaus

Personal details
- Born: 1980 (age 45–46) Ramallah, West Bank
- Party: Democratic
- Spouse: Samar
- Children: 2
- Education: University of New Orleans (BS, MS); Indiana University–Purdue University Indianapolis (MPA, PhD)
- Occupation: Politician

Fady Qaddoura (Arabic: فادي قدورة; born 1980) is an American politician from Indianapolis. A Palestinian American, and a member of the Democratic Party, he was elected to represent Senate District 30 in the Indiana Senate in the 2020 general election, becoming the first Arab Muslim lawmaker in the state's history. In the election, he defeated his Republican opponent, winning 52.5% of the vote.

== Life ==
Qaddoura was born in 1980 in Ramallah, in the West Bank, to Palestinian parents. Qaddoura traveled at the age of 18 to study computer science in the United States. He lost his home in 2005 after Hurricane Katrina.

Qaddoura studied at the University of New Orleans and obtained a bachelor's and a master's degree in computer science. He later studied at Rice University, where he obtained a master's degree in public administration and nonprofit management; he also holds a doctorate in philosophy (PhD) in philanthropy and public policy from Indiana University – Purdue University Indianapolis.

He has worked in scientific research at the University of Texas System and the University of New Orleans. He also has served as an adjunct faculty member at Indiana University – Purdue University Indianapolis. While studying at IUPUI, Qaddoura worked for the city of Indianapolis as a Chief Financial Officer. In 2018 he was named CFO of the Year by the Indianapolis Business Journal for balancing the city's budget three years in a row.

Qaddoura is married and has two daughters.

== Volunteering ==
Qaddoura volunteered with the Muslim American Society in Houston to help feed those in need after Hurricane Katrina while also being an evacuee himself. He was involved in providing logistical support digitally, building databases for the Muslim American Society to use in its efforts to provide resources to evacuees. During Ramadan of 2007, Qaddoura organized a community iftar, hosting refugees coming from Sudan, Somalia, and Nigeria.
