= Apptio =

American business software company

Apptio, Inc.
- Type: Subsidiary
- Traded as: Nasdaq: APTI
- Industry: Computer software IT services
- Founded: 2007; 19 years ago
- Founders: Sunny Gupta; Paul Mclachlan; Kurt Shintaffer
- Headquarters: Bellevue, Washington, United States
- Area served: Worldwide
- Key people: Sunny Gupta (CEO); Kurt Shintaffer (CFO); Jeremy Ung (CTO); Allison Breeding (CMO)
- Products: Business Management Applications, Cloud Financial Management, Investment Planning
- Revenue: $300 million (2020)
- Owner: Vista Equity Partners (2019–2023)
- Number of employees: 1,200 (2020)
- Parent: IBM (2023–present)
- Website: www.apptio.com

Apptio, Inc. is a Bellevue, Washington-based company founded in 2007 that develops technology business management (TBM) software as a service (SaaS) applications. Apptio enterprise apps are designed to assess and communicate the cost of IT services for planning, budgeting and forecasting purposes; Apptio's services offer tools for CIOs to manage technology departments' storage, applications, energy usage, cybersecurity, and reporting obligations; manage the costs of public cloud, migration to public cloud and SaaS portfolios; and adopt and scale Agile across the enterprise.

In 2009, the company was the first investment for Silicon Valley venture capital firm Andreessen Horowitz. The company has approximately 550 customers of various sizes. The company went public in September 2016.

On November 11, 2018, it was announced that Apptio would be acquired by the private equity firm Vista Equity Partners for $1.9 billion. That same year, Apptio acquired Digital Fuel, a cloud computing expenditure company, for $42.5 million.

In June 2023, IBM agreed to acquire Apptio from Vista for $4.6 billion. The acquisition was completed on August 10, 2023.

== History ==
The company was founded in 2007 by Sunny Gupta, Kurt Shintaffer and Paul McLachlan. Prior to founding the company, Gupta and Shintaffer worked together at iConclude before it was purchased by Opsware in 2007. In November 2007, the company received $7 million in funding from Madrona Venture Group and Greylock Partners while it was operating in stealth mode. Apptio raised an additional $14 million in Series B funding from the newly formed Andreessen Horowitz fund in 2009.

In 2010, the company raised an additional $16.5 million in Series C funding led by Shasta Ventures, with participation from previous investors.

In March 2012, the company raised an additional $50 million in Series D funding to continue scaling, hiring and expanding its services. In 2013, Apptio raised an additional $45 million in Series E funding, bringing its total raised to $136 million from firms including Greylock Partners, Madrona Venture Group, Janus Capital and T. Rowe Price.

In March 2014, Apptio opened offices in Sydney and Melbourne, Australia. In 2015, the company announced that it was adding an office in Denver. Apptio added another international office in March 2016, when it announced it would open an office in Paris, France. On September 23, 2016, Apptio raised $96 million with its IPO, opening on the NASDAQ stock exchange under the symbol APTI at $16 per share.

On February 2, 2018, Apptio completed the acquisition of Digital Fuel SV, LLC, a provider of IT business management (ITBM) tools. On November 11, 2018, Apptio entered into definitive agreement to be acquired by Vista Equity Partners for $1.94 billion. Apptio shareholders received $38.00 in cash per share, representing a 53% premium to the unaffected closing price as of November 9, 2018.

In 2019, Apptio acquired Cloudability, a firm that manages cloud spend. Apptio opened its first India office location in August 2019. In May 2020, LeanIX revealed technology collaboration with Apptio to include core IT spending data analytics.

In February 2021, the company acquired Targetprocess, a software platform that specializes in business investments, for agile. In April 2021, Apptio launched a redesigned portfolio of products including: ApptioOne, Targetprocess, and Cloudability. Apptio announced its first certified solution and integration with ServiceNow in July 2021. The following month, Apptio opened its Kraków, Poland office.

In December 2021, the company announced its collaboration with Microsoft to deploy Apptio’s platform on Microsoft Cloud to help enterprises migrate and optimize workloads. Apptio also partnered with IBM to accelerate enterprise transformation and improve hybrid cloud technology that same year.

In June 2023, IBM agreed to acquire Apptio from Vista Equity Partners for $4.6 billion in an all-cash deal. In August, the company announced the completion of the acquisition of Apptio.

== Technology Business Management Council ==
Apptio founded the Technology Business Management Council in 2012, a non-profit organization that had over 2,900 CIOs and other senior IT leaders by 2014. It was reported by the Puget Sound Business Journal that the council "aims to help IT departments run like businesses by setting standards and best practices" . The council held its first conference in November 2013.
