= Scott Schneider =

American politician

Member of the Indiana Senate from the 30th district
- In office July 21, 2009 – December 31, 2016
- Preceded by: Teresa Lubbers
- Succeeded by: John Ruckelshaus

Member of the Indianapolis City-County Council
- In office January 3, 2000 – 2007
- Preceded by: William Schneider
- Succeeded by: Christine Scales

Personal details
- Party: Republican
- Education: Indiana Wesleyan University
- Occupation: VP of Sales and Marketing at Mister Ice of Indianapolis, Inc.

Scott Schneider is a former Republican member of the Indiana Senate, representing the 30th District from 2009 to 2016. He attended Indiana Wesleyan University. Schneider served two terms on the Indianapolis City–County Council from 1999 to 2007. He succeeded his father, William Schneider, on the City Council. Schneider was succeeded by Christine Scales. He has been working as the VP of Sales and Marketing at Mister Ice of Indianapolis, Inc. since 1989.

Schneider supported a bill that would have allowed creationism to be taught along with evolutionary biology in Indiana public schools. He also authored a bill to stop federal money from going to Planned Parenthood of Indiana. In 2012 Schneider led an effort to get anti-union "right to work" legislation enacted in Indiana. In 2015 Schneider was an author of and voted for Indiana SB 101.

Schneider issued a press release on September 12, 2015, announcing that he would not be seeking re-election once his term ended in 2016
