= Wallbach, Aargau =

Wallbach
- Municipality
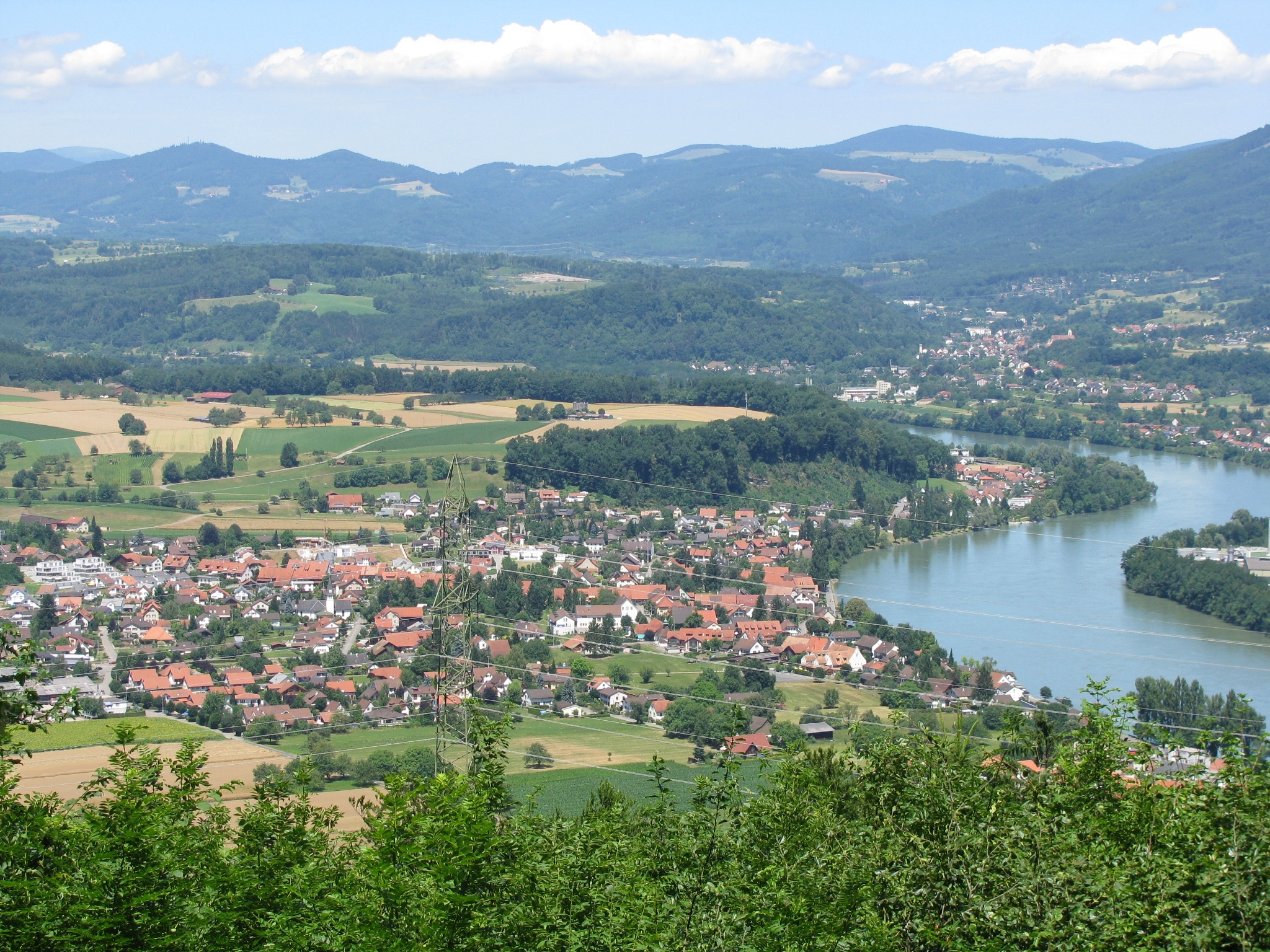
- Wallbach village

- Flag Coat of arms
- Location of Wallbach
- Location within Switzerland Location within Canton of Aargau
- Coordinates: 47°34′N 7°54′E
- Country: Switzerland
- Canton: Aargau
- District: Rheinfelden

Government
  - Mayor: Marion Wegner-Hänggi (Die Mitte)

Area
  - Total: 4.51 km^{2} (1.74 sq mi)
- Elevation: 288 m (945 ft)

Population (December 2005)
  - Total: 1,642
  - Density: 364/km^{2} (943/sq mi)
- Time zone: UTC+01:00 (CET)
  - Summer (DST): UTC+02:00 (CEST)
- Postal code: 4323
- SFOS number: 4261
- ISO 3166 code: CH-AG
- Surrounded by: Bad Säckingen (DE-BW), Möhlin, Mumpf, Wehr (DE-BW), Zeiningen
- Website: www.wallbach.ch

Wallbach (German pronunciation: [ˈvalbax]) is a municipality in the district of Rheinfelden in the canton of Aargau in Switzerland.

== Geography ==
Aerial view (1949)

Wallbach has an area, as of 2009, of 4.51 square kilometers (1.74 sq mi). Of this area, 1.95 km^{2} (0.75 sq mi) or 43.2% is used for agricultural purposes, while 1.32 km^{2} (0.51 sq mi) or 29.3% is forested. Of the rest of the land, 0.81 km^{2} (0.31 sq mi) or 18.0% is settled (buildings or roads), 0.4 km^{2} (0.15 sq mi) or 8.9% is either rivers or lakes.

Of the built up area, industrial buildings made up 1.8% of the total area while housing and buildings made up 11.1% and transportation infrastructure made up 3.8%. Out of the forested land, all of the forested land area is covered with heavy forests. Of the agricultural land, 33.7% is used for growing crops and 8.4% is pastures, while 1.1% is used for orchards or vine crops. All the water in the municipality is flowing water.

== Coat of arms ==
The blazon of the municipal coat of arms is Gules a Patriarchal Cross pattee Argent and in chief a Mullet of the same.

== Demographics ==
Wallbach has a population (as of December 2020) of 1,999. As of June 2009, 10.0% of the population are foreign nationals. Over the last 10 years (1997–2007) the population has changed at a rate of 17.8%. Most of the population (as of 2000) speaks German (94.2%), with Italian being second most common ( 1.2%) and French being third ( 1.1%).

The age distribution, as of 2008, in Wallbach is; 166 children or 9.5% of the population are between 0 and 9 years old and 230 teenagers or 13.1% are between 10 and 19. Of the adult population, 153 people or 8.7% of the population who are between 20 and 29 years old. 214 people or 12.2% are between 30 and 39, 369 people or 21.0% are between 40 and 49, and 255 people or 14.5% are between 50 and 59. The senior population distribution is 196 people or 11.2% of the population are between 60 and 69 years old, 121 people or 6.9% are between 70 and 79, there are 43 people or 2.5% who are between 80 and 89, and there are 8 people or 0.5% who are 90 and older.

As of 2000, there were 38 homes with 1 or 2 persons in the household, 328 homes with 3 or 4 persons in the household, and 237 homes with 5 or more persons in the household. As of 2000, there were 623 private households (homes and apartments) in the municipality, and an average of 2.4 persons per household. In 2008 there were 434 single family homes (or 58.3% of the total) out of a total of 744 homes and apartments. There were a total of 6 empty apartments for a 0.8% vacancy rate. As of 2007, the construction rate of new housing units was 14.6 new units per 1000 residents.

In the 2007 federal election the most popular party was the SVP which received 40.34% of the vote. The next three most popular parties were the CVP (17.86%), the FDP (14.69%) and the SP (14%). In the federal election, a total of 520 votes were cast, and the voter turnout was 41.9%.

The historical population is given in the following table:

Historical population
Year	Pop.	±%
1975	1,057	—
1980	1,068	+1.0%
1990	1,253	+17.3%
2000	1,532	+22.3%

== Heritage sites of national significance ==
The Businger house and the Stelli, both parts of the late-Roman era Rhine fortifications are listed as Swiss heritage sites of national significance. The entire village of Wallbach is designated as part of the Inventory of Swiss Heritage Sites.

== Economy ==
As of 2007, Wallbach had an unemployment rate of 1.41%. As of 2005, there were 28 people employed in the primary economic sector and about 12 businesses involved in this sector. 386 people are employed in the secondary sector and there are 20 businesses in this sector. 160 people are employed in the tertiary sector, with 41 businesses in this sector.

In 2000 there were 802 workers who lived in the municipality. Of these, 595 or about 74.2% of the residents worked outside Wallbach while 284 people commuted into the municipality for work. There were a total of 491 jobs (of at least 6 hours per week) in the municipality. Of the working population, 13.9% used public transportation to get to work, and 54.7% used a private car.

Swiss watch companies Roamer and Jaques du Manoir have their headquarters in Wallbach.

== Religion ==
From the 2000 census, 794 or 52.0% were Roman Catholic, while 336 or 22.0% belonged to the Swiss Reformed Church. Of the rest of the population, there were 118 individuals (or about 7.73% of the population) who belonged to the Christian Catholic faith.

== Education ==
In Wallbach about 77.3% of the population (between age 25–64) have completed either non-mandatory upper secondary education or additional higher education (either university or a Fachhochschule). Of the school age population (in the 2008/2009 school year), there are 124 students attending primary school in the municipality.

Wallbach is home to the Schul-u. Dorfbibliothek Wallbach (School and Village library). The library has (as of 2008) 5,021 books or other media, and loaned out 13,500 items in the same year. It was open a total of 270 days with average of 6 hours per week during that year.
