= William Ruckelshaus =

American government official (1932–2019)

Bill Ruckelshaus
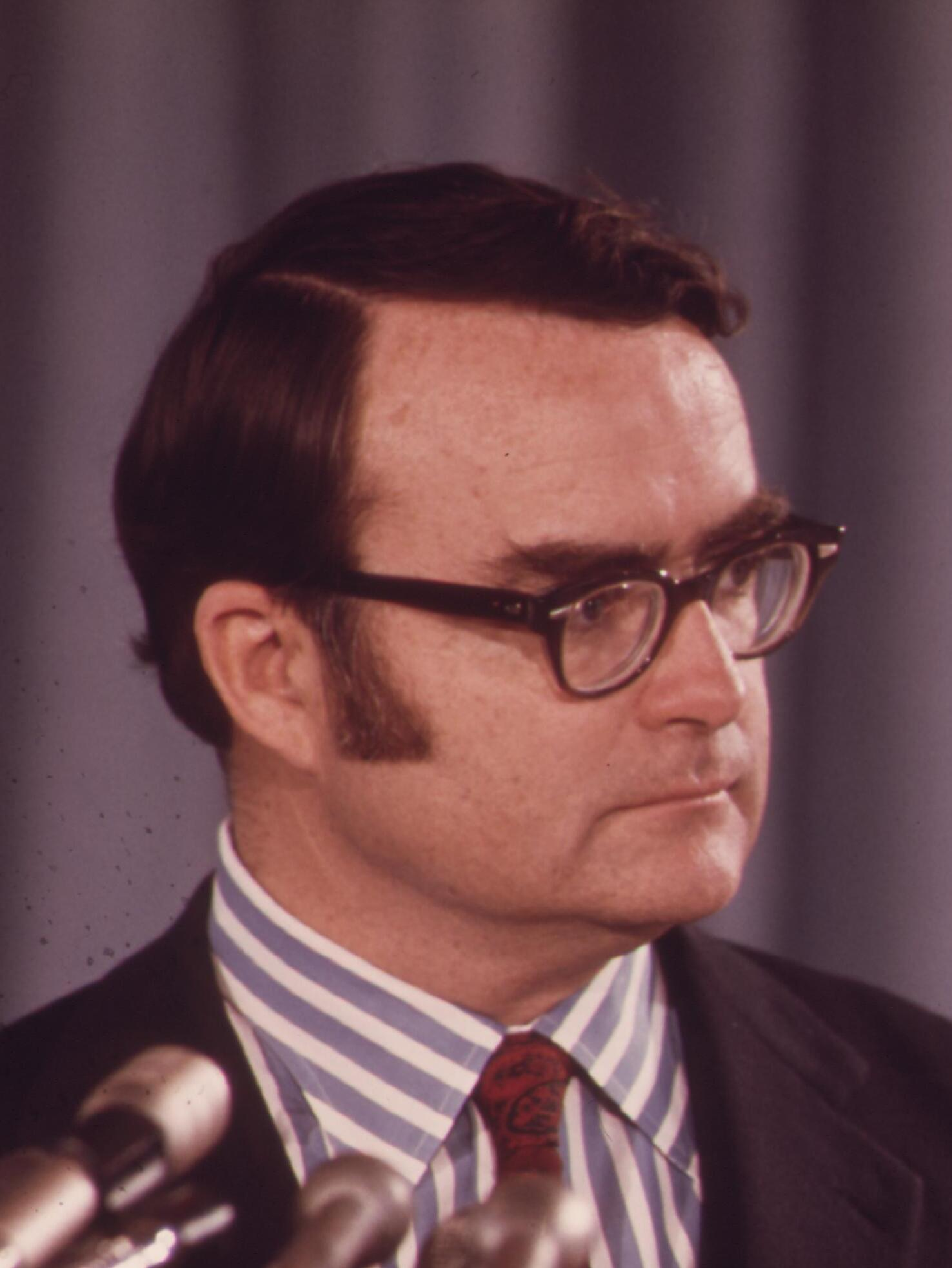
- Ruckelshaus in 1972

1st and 5th Administrator of the Environmental Protection Agency
- In office May 15, 1983 – February 7, 1985
- President: Ronald Reagan
- Deputy: Alvin L. Alm
- Preceded by: Anne Gorsuch Burford
- Succeeded by: Lee M. Thomas
- In office December 4, 1970 – April 30, 1973
- President: Richard Nixon
- Deputy: Robert W. Fri
- Preceded by: Position established
- Succeeded by: Russell E. Train

Acting United States Attorney General
- In office October 20, 1973
- President: Richard Nixon
- Deputy: Himself
- Preceded by: Elliot Richardson
- Succeeded by: Robert Bork (acting)

13th United States Deputy Attorney General
- In office July 9, 1973 – October 20, 1973
- President: Richard Nixon
- Preceded by: Joseph Tyree Sneed III
- Succeeded by: Laurence Silberman

Director of the Federal Bureau of Investigation
- Acting
- In office April 30, 1973 – July 9, 1973
- President: Richard Nixon
- Preceded by: L. Patrick Gray (acting)
- Succeeded by: Clarence M. Kelley

United States Assistant Attorney General for the Civil Division
- In office January 20, 1969 – December 4, 1970
- President: Richard Nixon
- Preceded by: Edwin Weisl
- Succeeded by: L. Patrick Gray

Member of the Indiana House of Representatives from the 26th district
- In office November 9, 1966 – November 6, 1968
- Preceded by: Multi-member district
- Succeeded by: Multi-member district

Personal details
- Born: William Doyle Ruckelshaus; July 24, 1932 Indianapolis, Indiana, U.S.
- Died: November 27, 2019 (aged 87) Medina, Washington, U.S.
- Party: Republican
- Spouses: Ellen Urban (m. 1960; died 1961); Jill Strickland (m. 1962)
- Children: 5
- Relatives: John C. Ruckelshaus (brother); John Ruckelshaus (nephew)
- Education: Princeton University (BA); Harvard University (LLB)
- Awards: Presidential Medal of Freedom (2015)

Military service
- Allegiance: United States
- Branch: United States Army
- Service years: 1953–1955
- Rank: Sergeant

William Doyle Ruckelshaus (July 24, 1932 – November 27, 2019) was an American attorney and government official.

Ruckelshaus served in the Indiana House of Representatives from 1966 to 1968, and was the United States Assistant Attorney General for the Civil Division from 1969 to 1970. He was also the first Administrator of the US Environmental Protection Agency (EPA) from 1970 to 1973, after being nominated by Richard Nixon. He returned to the position from 1983 to 1985, as the fifth Administrator of the EPA, during the Reagan administration. In 1973, he was also the acting FBI Director.

While serving as US Deputy Attorney General in October 1973, in what became known as the "Saturday Night Massacre," Ruckelshaus and US Attorney General Elliot Richardson resigned from their positions rather than obey the order of US President Richard Nixon to fire the independent special prosecutor, Archibald Cox, who was tasked with investigating Nixon's role in the Watergate scandal.

== Early life, military service, and education ==
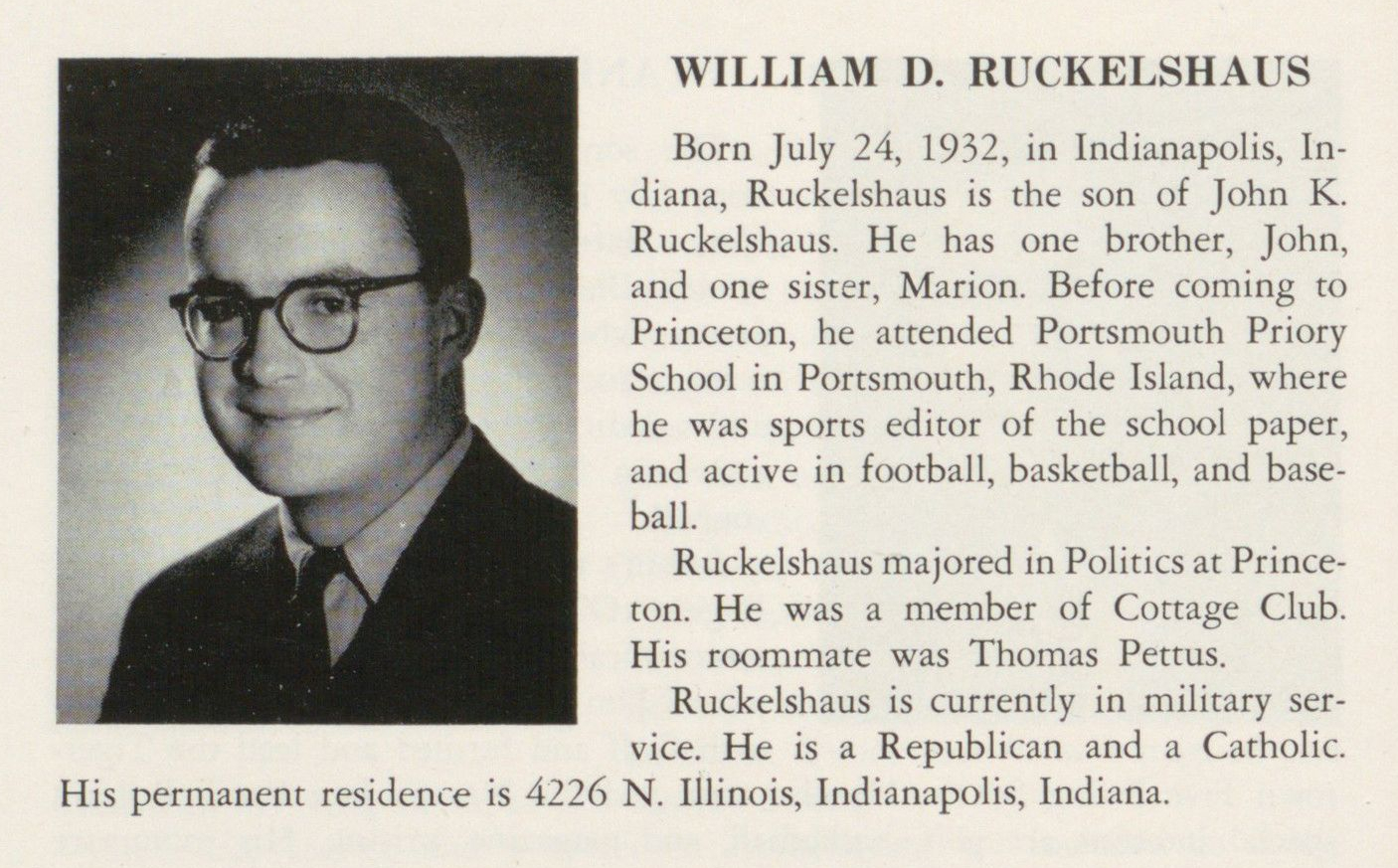
Ruckelshaus in the Princeton University yearbook, 1955

Ruckelshaus was born in Indianapolis, Indiana, on July 24, 1932, the son of Marion Doyle (née Covington) and John K. Ruckelshaus. He was from a distinguished family with a long history of practicing law in Indianapolis and serving in Republican Party politics.

He attended parochial schools until the age of 16, then finished high school in Portsmouth, Rhode Island, at the Portsmouth Abbey School.

He began college at Princeton University before being drafted and serving for two years in the United States Army, becoming a drill sergeant at Fort Lewis in Tacoma, Washington. He left the Army in 1955, returning to and graduating from Princeton with an A.B. (cum laude) in history in 1957 after completing a senior thesis titled "American Attitudes toward the Spanish Civil War." In 1960 he earned an LL.B. from Harvard Law School and joined the family law firm in Indianapolis.

In 1960, Ruckelshaus married Ellen Urban, who died the following year from complications incurred after giving birth to their twin daughters. In 1962 he remarried, to Jill Strickland, with whom he had three children.

His brother was John C. Ruckelshaus and his nephew was John Ruckelshaus; they also served in the Indiana General Assembly.

== Early legal and political career (1960–1970) ==
After passing the Indiana bar exam, Ruckelshaus joined the family law firm of Ruckelshaus, Bobbitt, and O'Connor.

In 1960, at age 28, he was appointed as Deputy Attorney General of Indiana, and served through 1965. For two years he was assigned to the Indiana Board of Health. As counsel to the Indiana Stream Pollution Control Board, Ruckelshaus obtained court orders prohibiting industries and municipalities from heavily polluting the state's water supply; he also helped draft the Indiana Air Pollution Control Act of 1961, the state's first attempt to reduce that problem. After that assignment, he spent two years as Chief Counsel for the Attorney General's Office.

In 1964, Ruckelshaus ran as a moderate Republican in the U.S. House election in Indiana's 11th district, losing in the primary to Don Tabbert, a candidate from the conservative wing of the party. He subsequently spent a year as minority attorney for the Indiana Senate.

He won a seat in the Indiana House of Representatives in 1966, benefiting from an up year for Republicans overall. He served in the House for one term, until 1968. He became the first first-term legislator to serve as majority leader of the House.

Ruckelshaus ran in the 1968 United States Senate election in Indiana, winning the Republican nomination, but losing the general election, 51%–48%, to incumbent Birch Bayh.

In 1969, President Richard Nixon appointed him as U.S. Assistant Attorney General for the Civil Division of the U.S. Department of Justice in Nixon's new administration. Ruckelshaus held the post until his appointment as the first administrator of the Environmental Protection Agency in 1970.

== EPA Administrator (1970–1973) ==
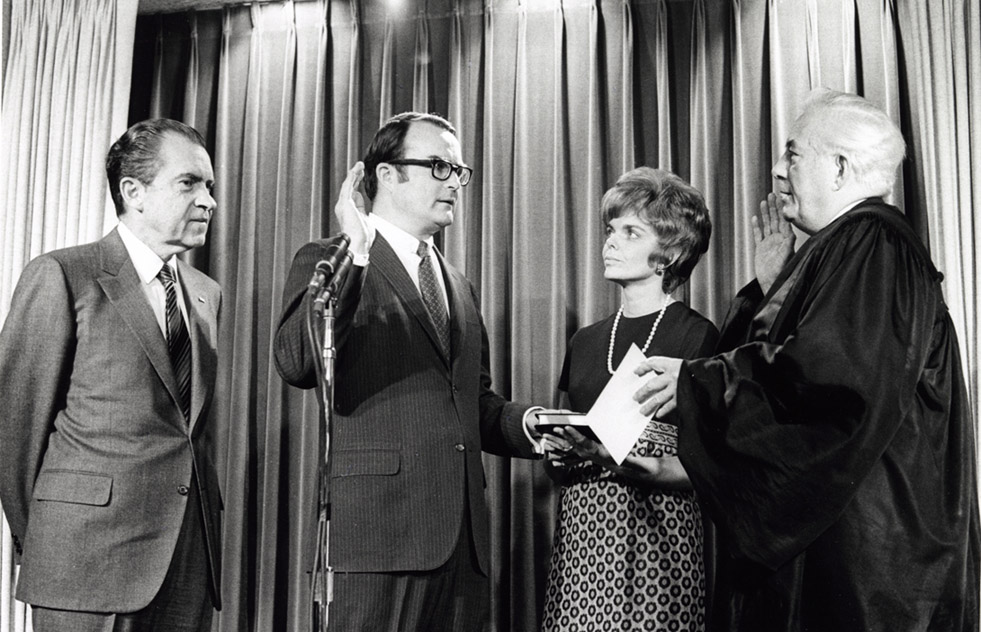
Ruckelshaus sworn in as first EPA Administrator. Those pictured from left to right are: President Richard M. Nixon, William Ruckelshaus, Jill Ruckelshaus, and Chief Justice Warren Burger.

Ruckelshaus became the US Environmental Protection Agency's first administrator when the agency was formed on December 2, 1970, by Nixon. Although many people were mentioned as possibilities for the new position, the choice of Ruckelshaus had been based upon the strong recommendation of US Attorney General John N. Mitchell. Ruckelhaus had been suggested in a Newsweek opinion column by a friend without his knowledge and was later approached Mitchell about the position.

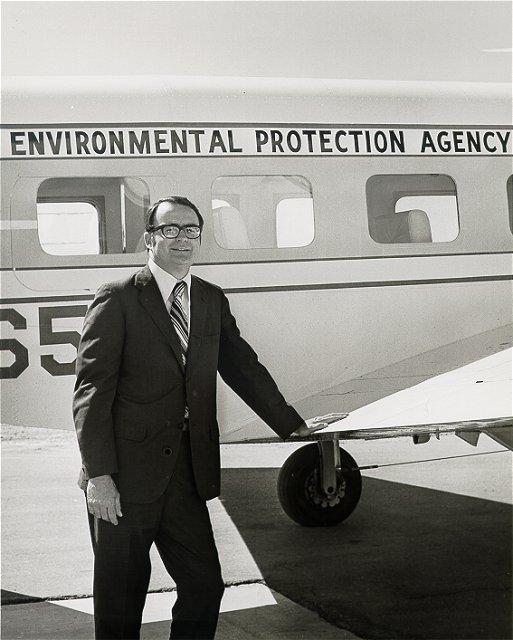
Administrator Ruckelshaus on a tour of the Four Corners Air Quality Region by EPA airplane, 1971

The burning of the Cuyahoga River had created a national outcry. The Justice Department under Mitchell filed a civil lawsuit against the Jones and Laughlin Steel Company "for discharging substantial quantities of cyanide into the Cuyahoga" at Ruckelshaus's request and sought an injunction "to halt the discharge of these deleterious materials into the river ...".

Also during his first tenure at the EPA, Ruckelshaus advocated for and enacted a ban on the insecticide DDT.

Ruckelshaus laid the foundation for the EPA by hiring its leaders by defining its mission, deciding on priorities, and selecting an organizational structure. He also oversaw the implementation of the Clean Air Act of 1970.

== Saturday Night Massacre (1973) ==
In April 1973, during the growing Watergate scandal, there was a major reshuffling of Nixon administration posts because of the resignations of White House Chief of Staff H. R. Haldeman and Domestic Affairs Advisor John Ehrlichman. Ruckelshaus's record of success at EPA and Justice and his reputation for integrity led to his being appointed acting Director of the Federal Bureau of Investigation to replace L. Patrick Gray III, "who had allowed Nixon aides to examine Watergate files and had even destroyed evidence in the case." Later that year, Ruckelshaus was promoted to Deputy Attorney General.

On October 20, 1973, in the event known as the "Saturday Night Massacre," Attorney General Elliot Richardson and then Ruckelshaus resigned their positions, rather than obey orders from Nixon to fire the Watergate special prosecutor, Archibald Cox, who was investigating official misconduct by Nixon and his aides and sought "tape recordings that... would incriminate" Nixon. After the resignations, the third in command at the Justice Department, US Solicitor General Robert Bork immediately effected the firing and the abolition of the special prosecutor's office, completing the "Massacre." However, 300,000 telegrams, release of the tapes, the reinstatement of a special prosecutor, and (ultimately) Nixon's resignation in August 1974 would occur over the next 10 months.

== Private law (1973–1983) ==
After leaving the Justice Department, Ruckelshaus returned to the private sector as an attorney at the Washington law firm of Ruckelshaus, Beveridge, Fairbanks, and Diamond from 1973 to 1975.

In 1975, Ruckelshaus moved to Seattle, Washington, where he accepted a position as senior vice-president for law and corporate affairs of the Tacoma-based Weyerhaeuser timber company. Ruckelshaus remained in that position until 1983.

Ruckelshaus was one of Gerald Ford's preferred candidates to be his vice presidential running mate in the 1976 election. Ford selected Bob Dole; the two lost the election to Democrat Jimmy Carter and his running mate, Walter Mondale.

== Return to the EPA (1983–1985) ==
In 1983, with the EPA in crisis due to mass resignations over the mishandling of the Superfund program, President Ronald Reagan appointed Ruckelshaus to serve as EPA Administrator again. This time it was White House Chief of Staff James Baker who was Ruckelshaus's champion in asking him to return to the agency. The White House acceded to Ruckhelshaus's request to allow him maximum autonomy in the choice of new appointees.

Ruckelshaus's predecessor, Anne Gorsuch Burford (mother of future U.S. Supreme Court Justice Neil Gorsuch), had depleted the EPA by asking Congress to cut the agency's budget, eliminating jobs and halting enforcement activities. On his second day after taking over for Burford, Ruckelsaus fired four people on the agency's management team.

Under Ruckelshaus's tenure, the issue of asbestos in schools was directed against the EPA.

Ruckelshaus attempted to win back public confidence in the EPA, a challenging task in the face of a skeptical press and a wary Congress, both of whom scrutinized all aspects of the agency's activities and some of whom interpreted a number of its actions in the worst possible light. Nonetheless, Ruckelshaus filled the top-level staffing slots with persons of competence, turned the attention of the staff back to the agency's fundamental mission, and raised the esteem of the agency in the public mind.

On November 28, 1984, Ruckelshaus announced that he would be retiring as EPA head, effective January 5, 1985, around the start of President Reagan's second term. He remained Administrator until February 7, 1985, when his successor, Lee M. Thomas, was confirmed.

Of his two tenures at EPA, Ruckelshaus later reflected:

I've had an awful lot of jobs in my lifetime, and in moving from one to another, have had the opportunity to think about what makes them worthwhile. I've concluded there are four important criteria: interest, excitement, challenge, and fulfillment. I've never worked anywhere where I could find all four to quite the same extent as at EPA. I can find interest, challenge, and excitement as [board chair of a company]. I do have an interesting job. But it is tough to find the same degree of fulfillment I found in the government. At EPA, you work for a cause that is beyond self-interest and larger than the goals people normally pursue. You're not there for the money, you're there for something beyond yourself.

== Subsequent career ==
=== 1980s and 1990s ===
Ruckelshaus was at Perkins Coie, a Seattle-based law firm, from 1985 to 1988. From 1983 to 1986, he was on the World Commission on Environment and Development set up by the United Nations.

From 1988 to 1999, he was chief executive officer of Browning-Ferris Industries of Houston, Texas, a major and expanding waste-removal firm. During his tenure, Browning Ferris shifted from a focus on hazardous wastes to recycling. As the company expanded its operations into New York City, Ruckelshaus "helped investigators infiltrate a Mafia-dominated carting conspiracy, leading prosecutors to obtain indictments."

After leaving Browning-Ferris, Ruckelshaus became a partner in the private investment firm, Madrona Venture Group.

President Bill Clinton appointed Ruckelshaus as a member of the President's Council for Sustainable Development from 1993 to 1997, and as U.S. special envoy in the implementation of the Pacific Salmon Treaty from 1997 to 1998. He was also appointed Chairman of the Salmon Recovery Funding Board for the state of Washington.

=== 2000s and 2010s ===
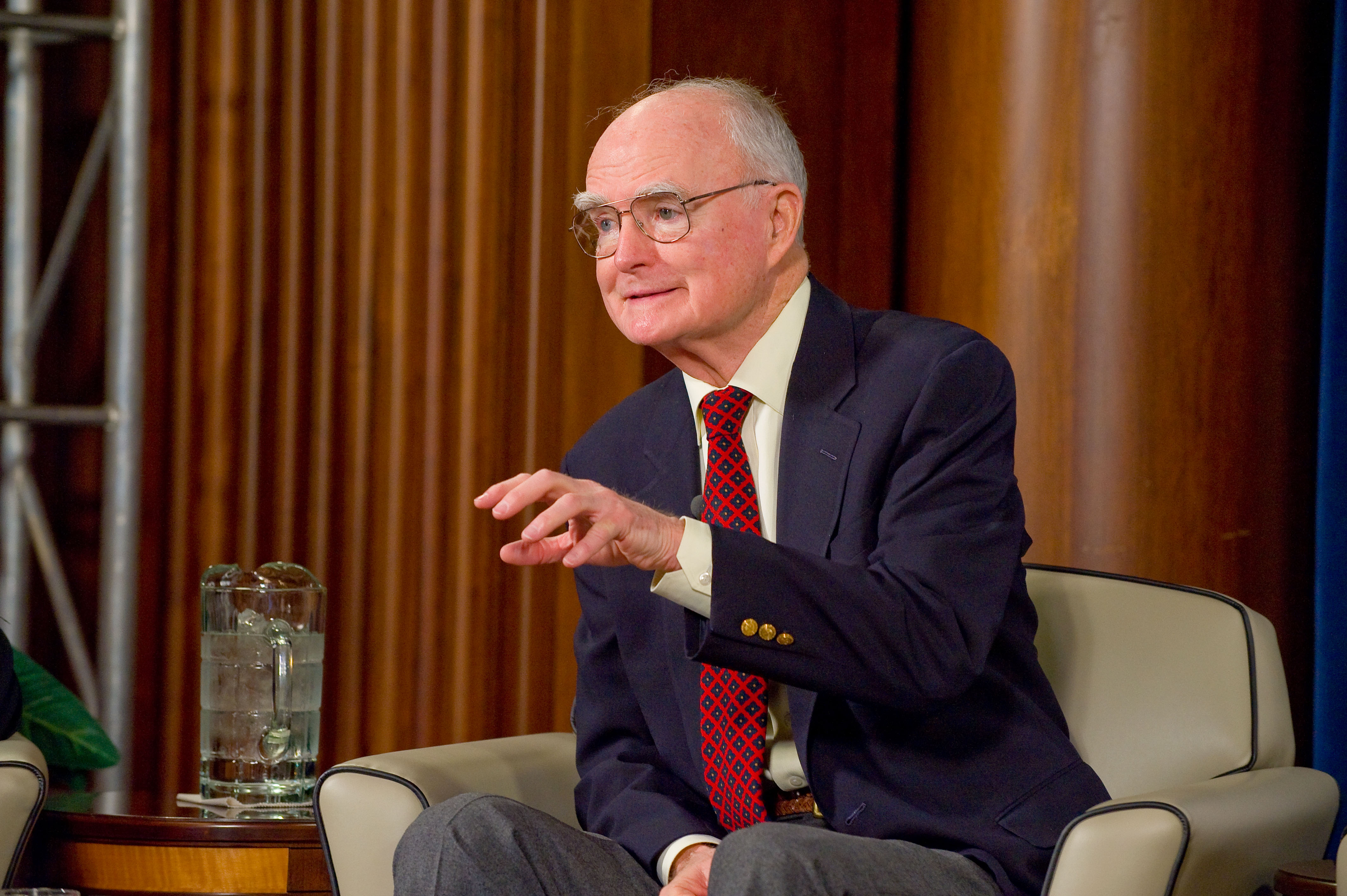
Ruckelshaus speaking at an EPA event celebrating the agency's 40th anniversary in 2010.

Ruckelshaus was appointed by President George W. Bush to serve on the United States Commission on Ocean Policy, which submitted its Final Report to the President and Congress, An Ocean Blueprint for the 21st Century, in 2004.

In June 2010, Ruckelshaus became co-chair of the Joint Ocean Commission Initiative.

Ruckelshaus was a director on boards of corporations, including Isilon Systems, Monsanto, Cummins, Pharmacia, Solutia, Coinstar, Nordstrom, Pfizer, and Weyerhaeuser.

He was Chair of the Advisory Board of The William D. Ruckelshaus Center at the University of Washington and Washington State University, Chair Emeritus of the University of Wyoming's Ruckelshaus Institute for Environment and Natural Resources, Chairman Emeritus of the World Resources Institute, and Chair of the Meridian Institute. He was a director of the Initiative for Global Development.

In 2008, Ruckelshaus endorsed Barack Obama in the 2008 election for President of the United States. In August 2016, Ruckelshaus and another former Republican-appointed EPA administrator, William K. Reilly, jointly endorsed Hillary Clinton for president in the 2016 election.

In 2008, Ruckelshaus was appointed to the Washington State Puget Sound Partnership, an agency devoted to cleaning up Puget Sound. In early 2012, Ruckelshaus was appointed co-chair of the Washington Blue Ribbon Panel on ocean acidification.

In August 2018, Ruckelshaus drew parallels to the actions of President Donald Trump's administration relating to special prosecutor Robert Mueller and Ruckelshaus's own experiences during the Massacre and with President Nixon's "disrespect for the rule of law" in an opinion-editorial in The Washington Post.

=== Presidential Medal of Freedom ===
In November 2015, Ruckelshaus was awarded the Presidential Medal of Freedom by President Barack Obama during a ceremony at the White House.

== Death ==
Ruckelshaus died at his home in Medina, Washington, on November 27, 2019, at age 87.

Party political offices
Preceded by Homer Capehart	Republican nominee for U.S. Senator from Indiana (Class 3); 1968	Succeeded by Richard Lugar
Legal offices
Preceded by Edwin Weisl	United States Assistant Attorney General for the Civil Division; 1969–1970	Succeeded by Pat Gray
Preceded by Joseph Tyree Sneed III	United States Deputy Attorney General; 1973	Succeeded by Laurence Silberman
Preceded by Elliot Richardson	United States Attorney General; Acting; 1973	Succeeded by Robert Bork; Acting
Political offices
New office	Administrator of the Environmental Protection Agency; 1970–1973	Succeeded by Russell Train
Preceded by Anne Gorsuch	Administrator of the Environmental Protection Agency; 1983–1985	Succeeded by Lee Thomas
Government offices
Preceded by Pat Gray; Acting	Director of the Federal Bureau of Investigation; Acting; 1973	Succeeded by Clarence Kelley
