= John C. Ruckelshaus =

American politician

John Ruckelshaus

Member of the Indianapolis City-County Council
- In office 1971–1975

Member of the Indiana Senate from the Marion County district
- In office November 20, 1956 – November 17, 1964 Serving with C. Wendell Martin, J. Russell Townsend Jr., Robert L. Brokenburr
- Preceded by: John G. Tinder; Donald M. Ream
- Succeeded by: Nelson G. Grills; Marie Theresa Lauck; Patrick E. Chavis Jr. Hugh E. Miles

Personal details
- Born: John Christian Ruckelshaus; January 4, 1930 Indianapolis, Indiana, U.S.
- Died: May 22, 2015 (aged 85)
- Party: Republican
- Spouse: Patricia
- Relations: William Ruckelshaus (brother); John Ruckelshaus (son)
- Children: 3
- Education: University of Notre Dame (BA); Indiana University, Indianapolis (JD)

John Christian "Jack" Ruckelshaus II (January 4, 1930 – May 22, 2015) was an American lawyer and politician.

== Biography ==
Ruckelshaus was born in Indianapolis, Indiana, where he attended Park School in 1948. He served in the United States Army Corps of Engineers from 1951 to 1952. He graduated from the University of Notre Dame in 1953 and the Indiana University Robert H. McKinney School of Law in 1957. Ruckelshaus was admitted to the Indiana State Bar in 1957, and practiced law in Indianapolis. Ruckelshaus served in the Indiana Senate from 1957 to 1964 as a Republican. He then served on the Indianapolis School Board from 1964 to 1968 and the Indianapolis City-County Council from 1971 to 1975. His brother was William Ruckelshaus, who served as United States Deputy Attorney General and two-time Administrator of the Environmental Protection Agency. His son is John Ruckelshaus, a former member of the Indiana Senate.

== Notes ==
Indiana Senate
Preceded by John G. Tinder; Donald M. Ream	Member of the Indiana Senate from the Marion County district 1956–1964; Served alongside: C. Wendell Martin, J. Russell Townsend Jr., Robert L. Brokenburr	Succeeded by Nelson G. Grills; Marie Theresa Lauck; Patrick E. Chavis Jr. Hugh E. Miles
