= Mary Alberg =

American physicist

Mary Alberg (née Mary Ann Johnke) is an American physicist specializing in the theory of nuclear physics. She is a professor emerita at Seattle University.

== Education and career ==
Alberg graduated from Wellesley College in 1963, with a bachelor's degree in physics. After working for the United States Atomic Energy Commission from 1963 to 1967, she continued her studies at the University of Washington, where she received a master's degree in 1970 and completed her Ph.D. in 1974. Her doctoral dissertation was Kaon-Nucleus Optical-Potential for Kaonic Atoms.

Alberg joined the Seattle University faculty as a lecturer in 1978. She became an assistant professor in 1979, an associate professor in 1983, and a full professor in 1992. She chaired the physics department from 1990 to 1995, and was named Arline Bannan Chair of Mathematics and Natural Sciences in 2000. She retired from Seattle University and was named as a professor emerita in 2021.

She was a cofounder of the Northwest Section of the American Physical Society (APS), in 1998.

== Recognition ==
Alberg was elected as a Fellow of the American Physical Society in 2014, after a nomination from the APS Division of Nuclear Physics, "for seminal contributions to understanding the sea of the nucleon and other baryons and her extraordinary service to the physics community".

== Personal life ==
Alberg married Tom Alberg, a lawyer and businessman, in 1963. They had three children before divorcing in 1989.
