= Impinj =

American manufacturer of RFID devices

Impinj, Inc.
- Type: Public
- Traded as: Nasdaq: PI; Russell 2000 component; S&P 600 component
- Industry: RFID
- Founded: 2000; 26 years ago
- Founders: Carver Mead; Chris Diorio
- Headquarters: Seattle, Washington, United States
- Key people: Steve Sanghi (chairman); Chris Diorio (CEO)
- Products: RAIN RFID devices including RFID tags, RFID readers, RFID reader chips, and RFID antennas
- Revenue: ▲US$366 million (2024)
- Operating income: ▲US$−7.1 million (2024)
- Net income: ▲US$40.8 million (2024)
- Total assets: ▲US$489 million (2024)
- Total equity: ▲US$150 million (2024)
- Owner
- Number of employees: 241 (2024)
- Website: impinj.com

Impinj, Inc. is an American manufacturer of radio-frequency identification (RFID) devices and software. The company was founded in 2000 and is headquartered in Seattle, Washington. The company was started based on the research done at the California Institute of Technology by Carver Mead and Chris Diorio. Impinj currently produces EPC Class 1, Gen 2 passive UHF RFID chips, RFID readers, RFID reader chips, and RFID antennas, and software applications for encoding chips, and gathering business intelligence on RFID systems.

== History ==
Impinj was founded in 2000 based on the research of Carver Mead and his student Chris Diorio. The name Impinj stands for "Impact-ionized Hot-electron Injection". In 2006, Impinj became the first company to introduce products based on the EPCglobal UHF Gen 2 standard. Bear Stearns reported in 2006 that Wal-Mart issued contracts to Impinj and Alien Technology, including them as significant suppliers for a total 15,000 RFID readers needed for Wal-Mart stores and distribution centers. The report invited speculation but was not confirmed.

In the same year, Impinj created new partnerships in Asia. In February, Impinj signed an Original Equipment Manufacturer agreement with the Hong Kong based company Convergence Systems Limited (subsidiary of the Chung Nam Group of Companies). In December, Impinj partnered with Korean company LS Industrial Systems (part of LS Group) to create RFID solutions targeting the Korean market.

In June 2008, Impinj sold its non-volatile memory business to Virage Logic. Also in 2008, Impinj acquired the Intel RFID division, including an Intel-developed RFID reader chip. Impinj renamed the chip Indy R1000. In 2009, Coca-Cola unveiled their Freestyle soda machine that gives users one hundred and sixty five different possible drink combinations. The Freestyle soda machine uses Impinj Monza tag chips and Indy reader chips to determine user preferences and to monitor the dispensers. Mexico has certified the Impinj Speedway reader to be used by state agencies in the electronic vehicle registration initiative beginning in Mexico in July 2010. In 2005, Impinj began working with Intel to develop RFID chips that would allow for "Processor Secured Storage." Impinj created two new chips for the project: Monza X-2K Dura and Monza X-8K Dura, which allow for increased theft deterrence and wireless configuration of electronic devices. The chips will be used in Intel's Microsoft Windows 8-based processors for tablet computers, which will be released in the second half of 2012.

== RFID products ==
=== Monza RFID tag chips ===
Introduced in April 2005, Monza tag chips were the first UHF Gen 2 RFID tag chips. Upon their introduction, it was announced that Impinj would be selling 50 million Monza tag chips that year. These 50 million chips were sold to nine different companies, including competitors Alien Technology and Texas Instruments. In 2010, Impinj introduced its Monza 4 tag chips with increased read and write capabilities and more memory options. In April 2011, Impinj released their new Monza 5 chips which are designed to speed item-level encoding, with fewer errors. The Monza 5 can boost encoding speeds by up to 220 percent compared with other RFID technology on the market. Announced in April 2012, Impinj's Monza X tag chips are intended for such applications as theft deterrence and wireless device configuration. When embedded in an electronic device (such as a laptop PC), the device processor or an RFID reader can write to or read data from that device through a Monza X chip, even when the device is powered off. Impinj developed the Monza X chips through a partnership with Intel that began in 2005. Impinj created the Monza X-2K and Monza X-8K Dura chips with lockable memory blocks and two independent antennas, which allow the chips to be read by both near field and long range readers. Intel will be using the Monza X chips in Microsoft Windows 8-based processors for tablet computers, to be released in the second half of 2012.

=== Speedway RFID readers ===
Speedway is a registered trademark of Impinj. Speedway products include Speedway Revolution RFID Reader and Speedway xPortal RFID reader.

The Speedway RFID reader was first introduced in 2005 as the first RFID reader sold by Impinj. Designed to meet the RFID Gen 2 standards, Speedway was one of Impinj's GrandPrix products alongside Monza.

The Speedway Revolution RFID reader was introduced in 2009. The Speedway Revolution is 80% smaller than the original Speedway RFID reader, measuring 6.75 x 5.5 x 1 inches. The Speedway Revolution introduced Autopilot technology, which enables the reader to reconfigure itself as the environment shifts.

Introduced in 2010, the Speedway xPortal is a RFID fixed reader that combined the Speedway Revolution with Dual-Linear Phased Array technology, with a smaller design than previous reader portals. Whereas previous portal readers weighed about 150 lbs, the Speedway xPortal weighs 6.5 lbs and measures 40.5 x 8.72 x 2 inches.

=== Indy RFID reader chips ===
In 2008, Impinj acquired the Intel RFID division, including an Intel-developed RFID reader chip which Impinj renamed Indy R1000. By combining many electrical components on one microchip, RFID reader chips can minimize size and costs of RFID readers. As of 2008, 40 to 50 manufacturers had developed readers using the R1000 chip. In 2009, Impinj unveiled the Indy R2000 reader chip, with increased performance designed for use in high-end readers for more challenging applications. In 2010, Impinj further expanded their reader chip portfolio by introducing the Indy R500 reader chip, a lower cost chip for applications that don't require high performance.

=== STP Source Tagging Platform ===
In 2011, Impinj announced its STP Source Tagging Platform, a combination of a reader and firmware designed for mass encoding of RFID tags. The platform consists of two systems: bulk encoding for tags already attached to items, or in-line encoding before tags are applied to products. The STP platform is capable of encoding 1100 tags per minute in the bulk system, and up to 1750 tags per minute using the in-line system. In 2012, Impinj announced a version 2 release of the STP platform that will enable brand owners and service bureaus to achieve encoding speeds up to 7,500 tags per minute.

=== Store Performance Simulator ===
Impinj's Store Performance Simulator (SPS), released in June 2012, is a "Web-based analysis tool" designed to show retailers how RFID can increase the accuracy of their inventory and positively impact profitability. A retailer can use SPS's 25 inputs to reflect their particular store and simulate various "what-if" scenarios, rather than running unfeasible real-world tests.

== See also ==
- Alien Technology
- Avery Dennison
- Intermec
- NXP
- Philips
- ST Microelectronics
- Symbol Technologies
- Tyco International
- UPM Raflatac
