= LeanIX =

German enterprise software company

- Industry: Software
- Founded: January 10, 2012; 13 years ago
- Founder: Jörg Beyer, André Christ
- Headquarters: Bonn, Germany
- Products: Enterprise Architecture
- Website: LeanIX.net

LeanIX is a German software company, founded on January 10, 2012 by Jörg Beyer and André Christ in Bonn, Germany. LeanIX is known for its enterprise architecture solutions.

On November 8, 2023, it was announced LeanIX became part of SAP.

== History ==
In August 2012, LeanIX launched its first public version of the Enterprise Architecture Management software.

In February 2015, Capnamic Ventures and Iris Capital invested $2.5 million in a Series A financing round.

LeanIX opened its first US office in Boston, Massachusetts, on February 6, 2017, and in July 2017, LeanIX raised $7.5 million in a Series B financing round led by Deutsche Telekom Capital Partners Management GmbH.

On December 6, 2018 of the same year the company raised $30 million in a Series C financing round led by Insight Venture Partners.

On July 8, 2020, LeanIX raised $80 million in a Series D funding round led by Goldman Sachs.

On March 2, 2021, LeanIX acquired the US-based company Cleanshelf and expanded its product offering with SaaS management capabilities.

On November 3, 2021, LeanIX launched a new Value Stream Management solution.

On June 9, 2022, LeanIX expanded its partnership with SAP.

On September 7, 2023 it was announced that SAP has entered into an agreement to acquire LeanIX. On November 8, 2023 it was announced LeanIX became part of SAP.

LeanIX is headquartered in Bonn, Germany, with additional offices in Boston (USA), London (UK), Paris (France), Amsterdam (Netherlands), and Ljubljana (Slovenia).
