= Chung Nam Group of Companies =

Hong Kong-based family conglomerate (est.1935, precision manufacturing)

Chung Nam Group
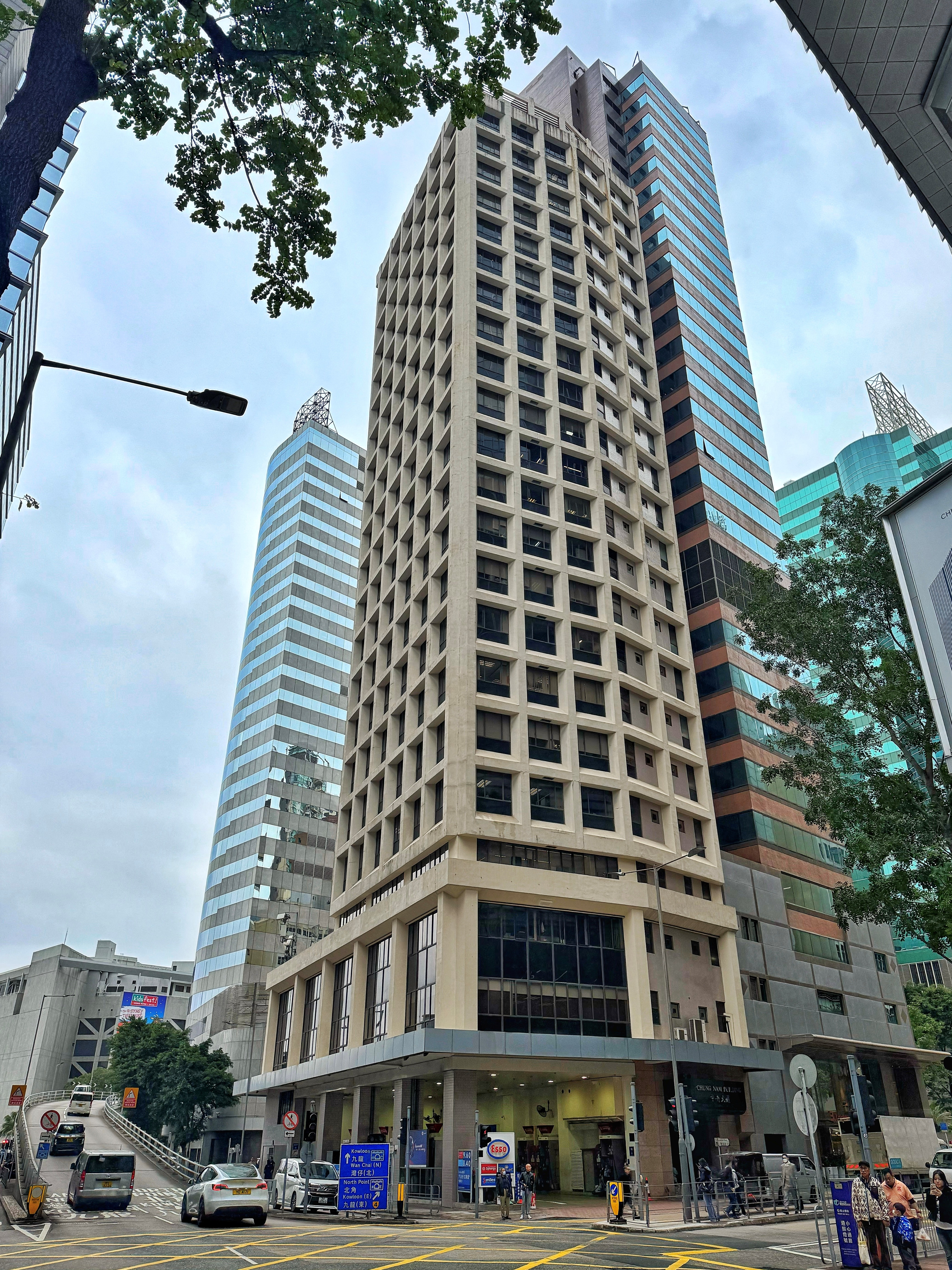
- Chung Nam Building at 1 Lockhart Road, Wan Chai, Hong Kong
- Type: Private (Family-owned conglomerate)
- Industry: Consumer Electronics; Automotive; Watch & Luxury; Semiconductor; New Materials; Bioengineering
- Founded: 1935; 91 years ago
- Founder: Mr. and Mrs. Chong Ching Um (莊靜庵夫婦)
- Headquarters: 1 Lockhart Road, Chung Nam Building, Wan Chai, Hong Kong Island, Hong Kong, China
- Key people: HS Chong; Chong Hot Hoi, Bob; Hok Hei Charles Chong
- Products: Forging & Stamping, Metal Injection Molding (MIM), Touch Panel, Cover Glass, PVD, Conductive Ink & Nano Material, Laser Machine, Bio-Technology, Electric/ Hybrid Vehicles
- Owner: Chong family (莊氏家族) (3rd-generation inheritance)
- Subsidiaries: CN Innovations (CNI); CN Precision Casing (CNPC(HK)); Maxford Technology; Vitalink Technology; Zoltrix Material; Winsky Industry; CN-BIO; msolv®; Chung Nam Watch; Time Network; Roamer of Switzerland; OCTO Watch; We R Family Foundation; CER Limited;
- Website: www.cn-innovations.com

Chung Nam Group (Chinese: 中南集團) is a Hong Kong-headquartered, family-owned conglomerate with roots in watchmaking, now diversified into consumer electronics, automotive, watch & luxury, semiconductor, new materials, and bioengineering.

Founded in 1935 by Mr. and Mrs. Chong Ching Um (莊靜庵), the group's headquarter is in Wan Chai, Hong Kong. Boasting a global presence across Asia, Europe, and the Americas, it currently employs over 10,000 people worldwide.

Products and services provided include metal processing & precision stamping, metal injection molding (MIM), touch panel, glass and polymer composite processing, and surface treatment covering both decorative and functional purposes. Other ventures include new energy vehicles, IC packaging equipment and in-vitro cell culture solutions .

== History ==
In its early days, Chung Nam Group primarily engaged in watch related businesses such as watch strap coating and chain production, operating as a modest small-scale enterprise. During its development, Founder Chong Ching Um recognized the vast business opportunities in the watch industry and began manufacturing watch straps. Their high quality and competitive pricing were well-received by distributors, enabling the business to expand rapidly, with its products even entering the mainland Chinese market. In the 1940s, while selling its own watch straps, Chong Ching Um also began importing Swiss watches for distribution in Southeast Asia. By the 1950s, he had established himself as Hong Kong's largest watch distributor and was known as "the King of Watches"（鍾錶大王）.

In the 1950s, Chung Nam Group shifted its focus to assembling Swiss watches and subsequently secured distribution rights for Swiss watch brands, which solidified its leading position in Hong Kong’s watch industry. In the 1960s, Chung Nam Watch pivoted to export-oriented operations. With the launch of quartz clock products in 1976, the company experienced a surge in overseas orders, cementing its status as Hong Kong’s largest watch merchant at the time. Building on this success, Chung Nam Group then embarked on a path of diversified development rooted in its watch business.

In the late 1980s and early 1990s, Chung Nam Group expanded its watch component manufacturing capabilities by introducing surface treatment and Metal Injection Molding (MIM) technologies, providing high-value-added decorative and precision parts through watch electroplating processes. However, the core process of this technology involved immersing products to be plated in chemical electroplating solutions, which caused severe environmental pollution, consumed enormous volumes of electricity and water, offered limited plating material options, and yielded suboptimal surface treatment results. In 1991, when the industry was still widely relying on this conventional technology, Chung Nam Group made the bold decision to abandon it and adopt semiconductor Physical Vapor Deposition (PVD) technology. PVD is a thin-film preparation technique that deposits materials onto workpieces via physical processes under vacuum conditions. This marked the first-ever application of PVD technology in the surface treatment of decorative watch components.

Throughout the 1990s, Chung Nam Group developed proprietary nanocomposite coating technology, which is capable of modifying the properties of other coatings. Later, to complement its metal processing capabilities, reduce the use of chemical agents, and decrease reliance on electroplating, the Group invested in the development and commercialization of thin-film, powder metallurgy, and metal injection molding (MIM) technologies.

In 1999, Nokia upgraded the plastic casings of its feature phones to titanium alloy. Leveraging its superior performance and user experience, PVD coatings were incorporated into Nokia’s supply chain, ushering in a decade of rapid growth for Chung Nam’s PVD coating business. Subsequently, Chung Nam Group gained entry into the supply chains of multiple top-tier 3C brands, kicking off a second decade of accelerated development.

Chung Nam Group established CN Innovation Group in 2006. Positioned as a platform for advanced materials and precision engineering technologies, the group specializes in the development of magnesium-aluminum alloys, ceramics, glass, stainless steel, touch panels, titanium materials, and high-end watch components. Today, it is one of the key suppliers to international mobile phone and 3C brands.

== Products ==
=== Consumer Electronics ===
- Cover and back glass
- Metal housings and precision parts
- Metal surface treatment including PVD, Micro-arc oxidation, anodization
- Touch panel
- Optical components
- Foldable solutions

=== Automotive ===
- Interior experience solutions
- Light metal housings and precision components
- Light metal surface treatment such as micro-arc oxidation
- Optical glass
- Specialty glass for LIDAR and HUD
- Centre console glass

=== Watch & Luxury ===
- Watch case, bracelet, and accessories
- Luxury products metal solutions
- Luxury glass solutions
- Hardware product incubation

=== Semiconductor ===
- Laser equipment for IC substrate production
- Specialty metal products for semiconductor fabs

=== New Materials ===
- Metal Powder for 3D Printing and MIM
- Nano Materials
- Conductive Inks and Pastes
- Lithium Battery Cathode Materials
- Specialty Coating Material Design and Manufacturing

=== Bioengineering ===
- Organ-on-Chip Services and Equipment Solutions

== Milestones ==
=== 1935-1990 ===
- 1935 Mr. and Mrs. Chong Ching Um founded Chung Nam Watch Co. Ltd. （中南鍾錶有限公司）
- 1940–50 Watch components production
- 1960–90 Watch assembly and wholesale

=== 1991–2000 ===
- 1991 Introduced metal injection molding (MIM) and physical vapor deposition (PVD) technologies
- 1991 Established the first surface treatment processing plant
- 1991 Established Maxford Technology Limited （萬津科技有限公司）
- 1998 Established Zoltrix Material International Limited（昶盛（物料應用製品）有限公司)
- 2000 Set up Chung Nam Industrial Park（中南工業園） for metal parts and surface treatment in Shenzhen, Bantian
- 2000 Expanded to include communications, computer and consumable electronic products, particularly components of mobile headsets

=== 2001–2006 ===
- 2001 Established Vitalink Technology (Shenzhen) Co., Ltd（維達力實業（深圳）有限公司))
- 2004 Built an MIM factory in Nansha, Guangzhou.
- 2004 Established CN Innovations Limited（中南創發有限公司）, Chung Nam Precision Casing Company Ltd.（中南機誠精密有限公司）, Zoltrix Material (Guangzhou) Limited（昶聯金屬材料應用製品(廣州)有限公司）
- 2005 CNPC worked with Nokia and Blackberry to produce precision accessories
- 2005 Established CN Precision Casing (Shenzhen) Co.（中南機誠精密製品（深圳）有限公司)
- 2005 Developed glass cover panel business
- 2005 Reformed its watch division and opened a metal manufacturing facility that specializes in forging and stamping in Pinghu, Shenzhen.
- 2006 Formed CN Innovations Group（中南創發集團）
- 2006 Established a glass cover panel manufacturing facility in Pinghu, Shenzhen
- 2006 Established Vitalink’s Fumin Branch（維達力實業（深圳）有限公司 富民分公司）

=== 2007–2016 ===
- 2007 Established M-Solv Limited to research and develop laser technology and production equipment
- 2007 Established Vitalink Optical Film Technology (Suzhou) Co., Ltd（維達力薄膜科技（蘇州）有限公司) for vacuum coating processing
- 2008 Magnesium injection molding (MIM) technology applied to commercial production
- 2009 Began glass cover business.
- 2010 Successfully mass-produced touchscreens
- 2010 Developed aluminum injection molding technology
- 2010 CNPC cooperated with high-end mobile brand Vertu, offering high-level mobile accessories
- 2012 Set up cover glass R&D center in Korea
- 2014 Set up cover glass R&D center in Pinghu, Shenzhen
- 2014 Established Vitalink’s Hehua Branch（維達力實業（深圳）有限公司 禾花分公司）
- 2014 First-class supplier of a top Korean brand
- 2015 Applied DLC (diamond-like carbon) coating technology for surface treatment of renowned US smartphone companies’ products
- 2015 Established Vitalink Industry (Chibi) Co., Ltd（維達力工業（赤壁）有限公司）
- 2016 Developed cover glass production base in Chibi, Hubei Province
- 2016 Established sales office for coating business in South Korea through Vitalink Korea Co. （維達力韓國有限公司）
- 2016 Established Winsky Industry Hong Kong Limited (盈天實業香港有限公司) and Winsky Industry Shenzhen Limited（盈天實業（深圳）有限公司）

=== 2017–now ===
- 2018 Established Vietnamese base for cover glass business
- 2018 Introduced metal Hot Isostatic Pressing (HIP) technology from Germany
- 2019 Produced touch sensors suitable for use in foldable touchscreens
- 2019 Established Maxford Industry (Chibi) co., Ltd (萬津實業（赤壁）有限公司)
- 2020 CNPC cooperated with new energy behicles to produce car interior parts and re-entered the field of Swiss watch case and bracelet accessories
- 2020 Vitalink Chibi officially commenced production for 3D glass cover
- 2021 2.5D glass front cover officially commenced production in Vietnam
- 2021 Bain Capital made a strategic equity investment in Vitalink
- 2022 CNPC entered a new field of semi-conductor parts
- 2024 MSolv opens its mainland China Branch in Zhuhai

== Facilities ==
Chung Nam Group maintains a worldwide operational network spanning Asia, Europe, and the Americas, with established offices and facilities located in:

- Hong Kong: Group Headquarter
- Shenzhen: Surface Treatment, Cover Glass, Metal Processing, Touch Panel
- Guangzhou: Metal Injection Molding, Magnesium Injection
- Ganzhou: Metal Injection Molding
- Chibi: Cover Glass, Surface Treatment
- Taipei: Sales Office
- Gumi: Surface Treatment, Sales Office
- Bac Giang: Cover Glass, Metal Processing, Touch Panel
- Chon Buri: Metal Processing
- Oxford: Laser Equipment
- Cambridge: Duren
- Duren: Heat Treatment Equipment
- Silicon Valley: Sales Office

== Company websites ==
- Chung Nam
- CN-Innovations
- Vitalink
- msolv®
- Roamer of Switzerland
- OCTO
- We R Family Foundation
- CER Limited
- Time Network Limited
