= Teresa Lubbers =

American politician

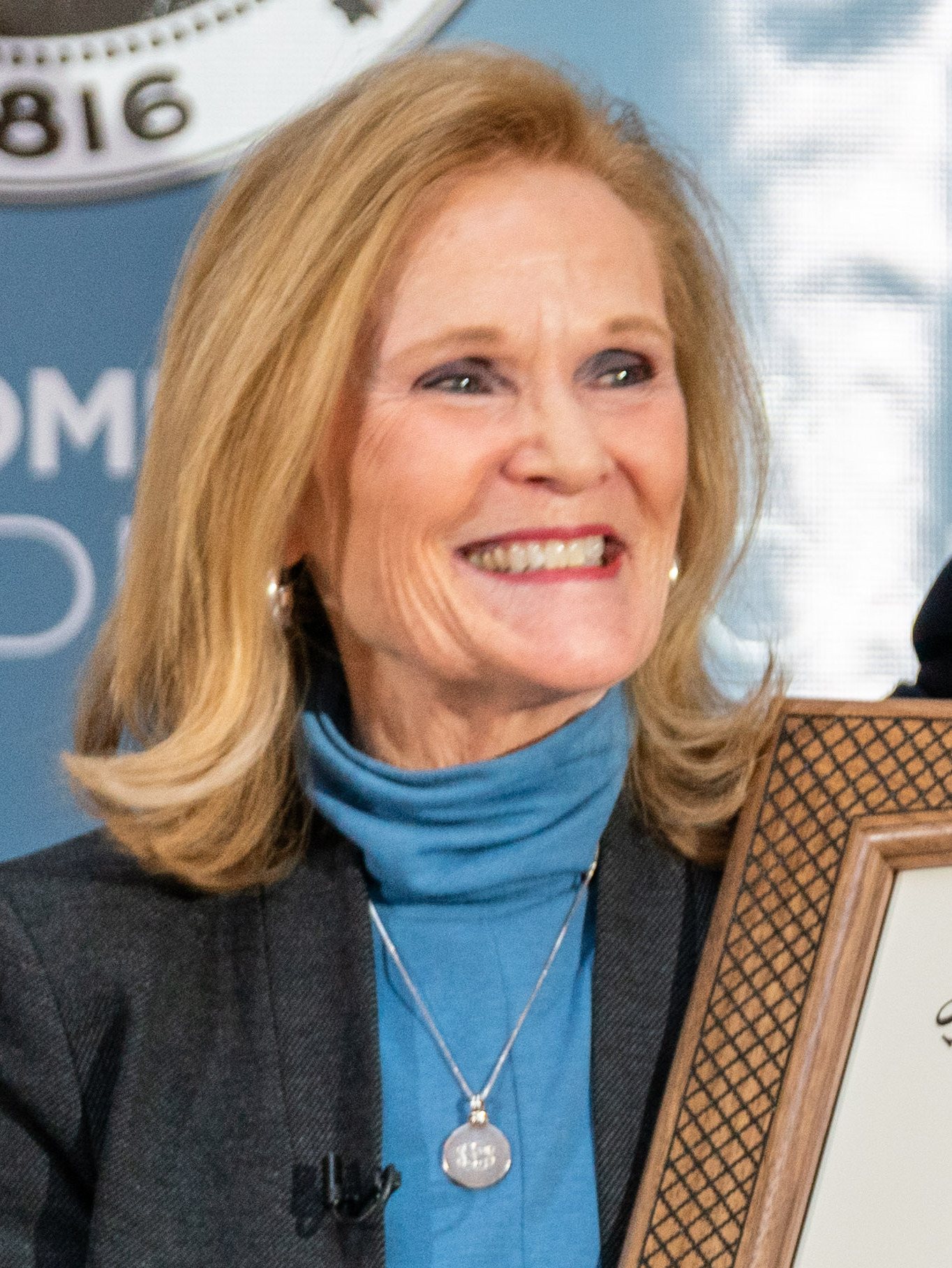

Indiana Commissioner for Higher Education
- In office 2009–2020
- Governor: Mitch Daniels; Mike Pence; Eric Holcomb
- Preceded by: Stan Jones

Member of the Indiana Senate from the 30th district
- In office November 4, 1992 – July 2, 2009
- Preceded by: Virginia Murphy Blankenbaker
- Succeeded by: Scott Schneider

Personal details
- Born: July 5, 1951 (age 75) Indianapolis, Indiana, U.S.
- Party: Republican
- Spouse: Mark
- Education: Indiana University Bloomington; Harvard Kennedy School
- Religion: Christian

Teresa Marie Lubbers (née Smith, born July 5, 1951) currently serves as president of Sagamore Institute, a think tank. She was Indiana Commissioner for Higher Education from 2009 to 2020. She served from 1992 to 2009 as a Republican member of the Indiana Senate, representing the 30th District. She resigned in 2009 and was replaced by former Indianapolis City-County Councilman Scott Schneider, who served the rest of her term.

== Political career ==
Lubbers was elected to represent the 30th District in the Indiana Senate in November 1992 with 73% of the vote. Lubbers was re-elected in 1996, 2000, 2004, and 2008. She represents parts of Marion and Hamilton Counties. During her time in the Indiana Senate, she served on a number of committees, including Education, Judiciary (Courts and Juvenile Justice Subcommittee), Pensions & Labor, and Planning & Economic Development Committee.

== Electoral history ==
Indiana State Senate Election 2008
Party	Candidate	Votes	%	±%
Republican	Teresa Lubbers	26,338	52.54%	
Democratic	Todd Degroff	19,834	39.57%	
Libertarian	Chambers	3,953	7.89%	

Indiana State Senate Election 2004
Party	Candidate	Votes	%	±%
Republican	Teresa Lubbers	30,308	88.36%	
Libertarian	Chambers	3,993	11.64%	

Indiana State Senate Election 1996
Party	Candidate	Votes	%	±%
Republican	Teresa Lubbers	36,401	66.97%	
Democratic	Chambers	16,909	31.11%	
Libertarian	Satterthwaite	1,041	1.92%	

Indiana State Senate Election 1992
Party	Candidate	Votes	%	±%
Republican	Teresa Lubbers	42,513	73.47%	
Democratic	Forestal	15,352	26.53%	

== Early life and education ==
Lubbers attended Warren Central High School in 1969. She received a bachelor's degree at Indiana University Bloomington in 1973 and a graduate degree in Public Administration from the Harvard Kennedy School in 1987. After graduation from Indiana University, she became the press secretary for Indianapolis Mayor Richard Lugar.

== Family life ==
Lubbers lives in Indianapolis with her husband Mark Lubbers and two daughters.
