= List of Jewish United States Cabinet members =

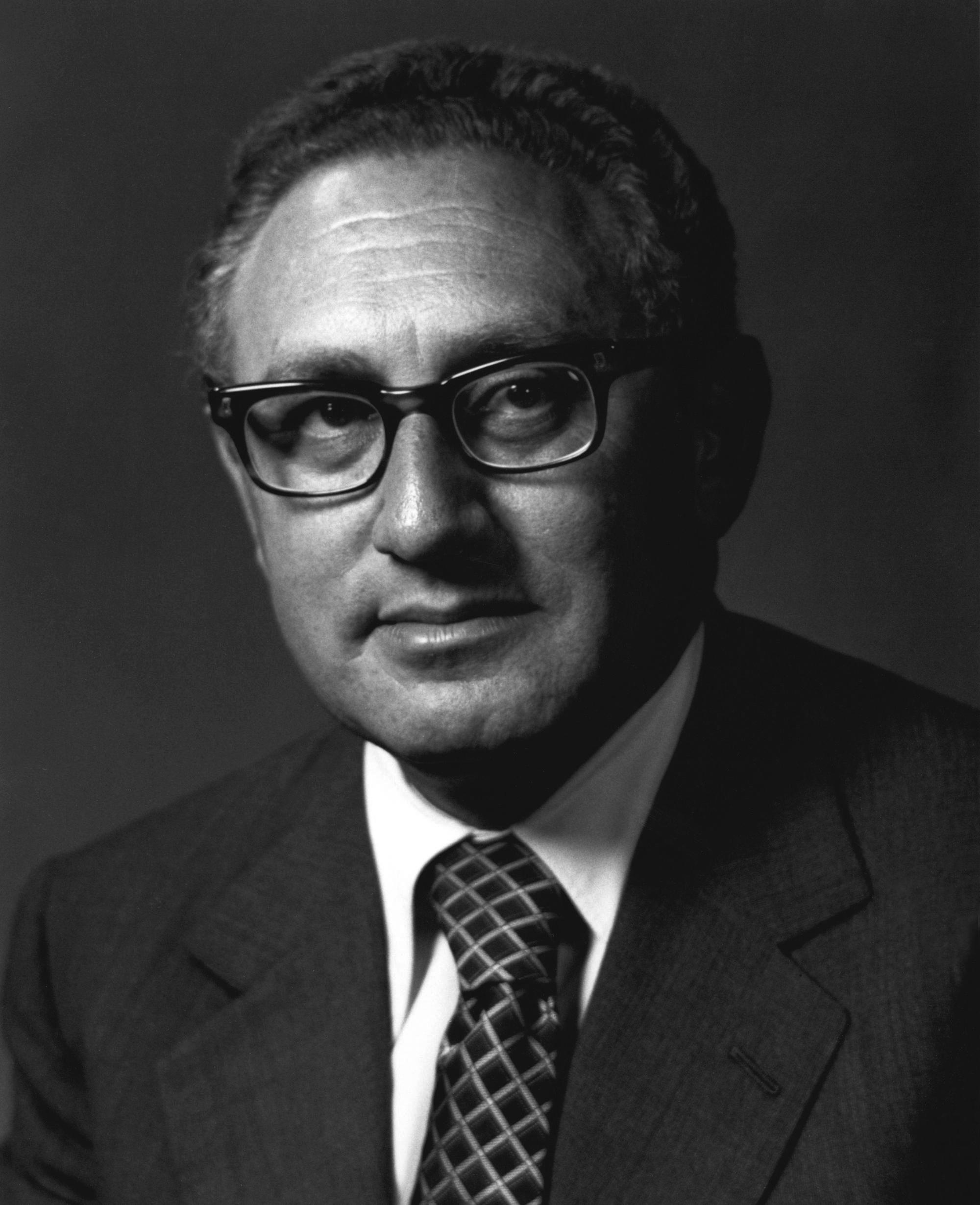
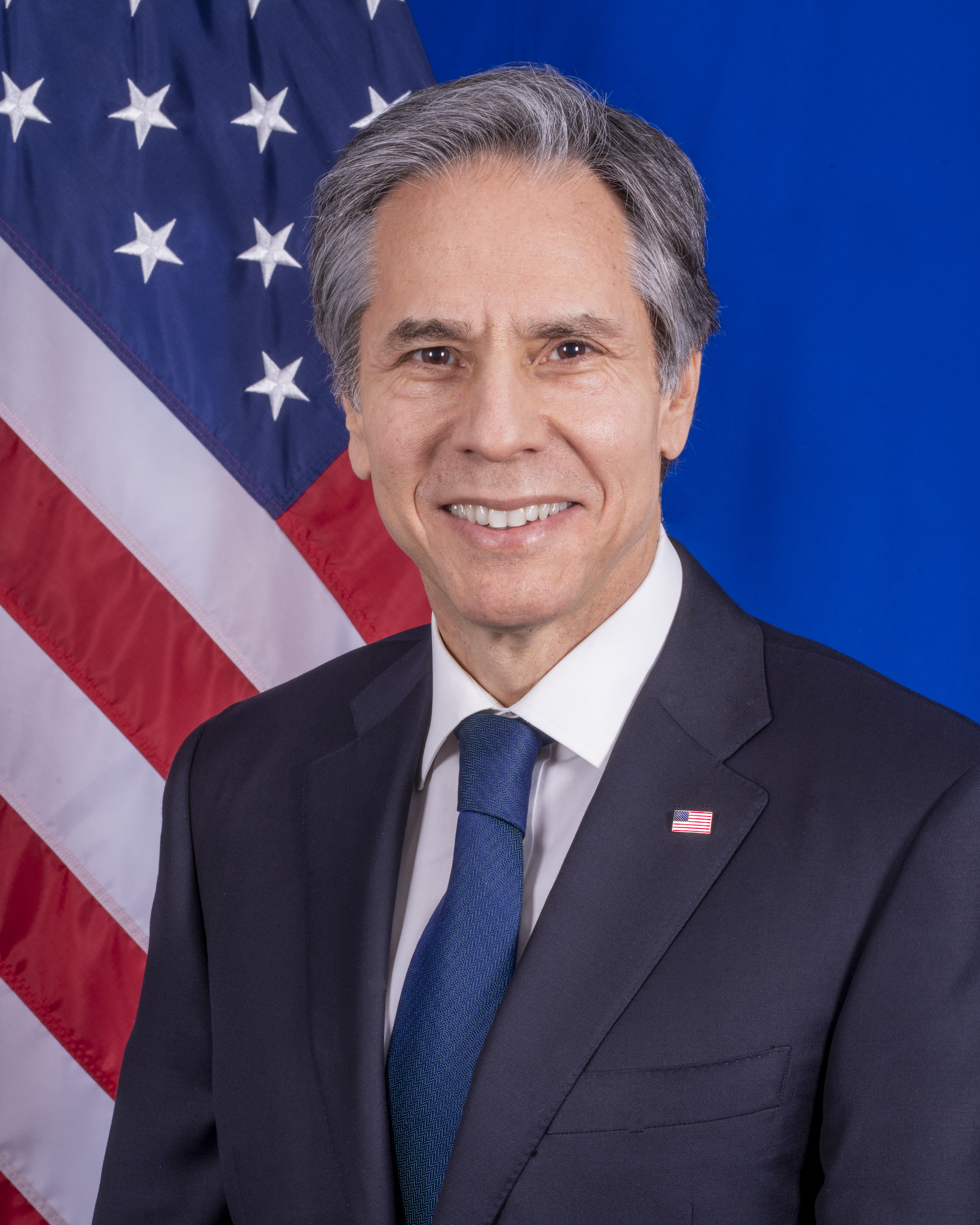
Henry Kissinger and Antony Blinken are the highest-ranking Jewish Americans to lead a federal executive department; both held the post of Secretary of State.

The Cabinet of the United States, which is the principal advisory body to the president of the United States, has had 47 Jewish American members altogether. Of that number, 27 different Jewish American individuals held a total of 27 permanent cabinet posts, having served as the heads of the federal executive departments; 20 different Jewish Americans have held 21 cabinet-level positions, which can differ under each president; and four officeholders served in both cabinet and cabinet-rank roles.

The first Jewish cabinet member was Oscar Straus, appointed Secretary of Commerce and Labor by President Theodore Roosevelt. The first Jewish woman to serve as cabinet member was Penny Pritzker who served as Secretary of Commerce under President Barack Obama. The greatest number of Jewish cabinet members appointed by a president is six by President Bill Clinton, followed by four each by presidents Jimmy Carter and Joe Biden.

The highest ranking Jewish cabinet members are Henry Kissinger and Antony Blinken, both of whom served a secretary of state. Before that, the highest ranking Jewish cabinet member was Henry Morgenthau Jr., who served as United States Secretary of the Treasury, but he was higher ranking in the line of succession. Janet Yellen, who served as Treasury Secretary, is the highest ranking Jewish woman to hold a cabinet post. Two Jewish cabinet secretaries were immigrants to the United States: Kissinger, Secretary of State under presidents Richard Nixon and Gerald Ford, and W. Michael Blumenthal, Secretary of the Treasury under President Jimmy Carter.

The United States Department of the Treasury has had the greatest number of Jewish appointees, with seven. The United States Department of Commerce has had four. The United States Department of Justice has had three. The Departments of State, Defense, Labor, Health, Education, and Welfare, (Note: The position was established as Secretary of Health, Education, and Welfare on April 11, 1953; renamed Secretary of Health and Human Services on May 4, 1980.) and Homeland Security each have had two. The Departments of Agriculture, Transportation, Veterans Affairs, and Commerce and Labour (now defunct) (Note: The department established on February 14, 1903; it was later split into the Departments of Commerce and Labor on March 4, 1913.) have had one each. The Departments of Energy, Education, Housing and Urban Development, and the Interior have had none.

The totals for this list include only Jewish American presidential appointees confirmed (if necessary) by the U.S. Senate to cabinet or cabinet-level positions and taking their oath of office; they do not include acting officials or nominees awaiting confirmation.

== Permanent cabinet members ==
The following list includes Jewish Americans who have held permanent positions in the cabinet, all of whom are in the line of succession to the presidency. The table below is organized based on the beginning of their terms in office. Officeholders whose terms begin the same day are listed according to the presidential order of succession.

* denotes the first Jewish holder of that particular office

No.	Name	Office	Succession	Start	End	Party	President(s)	Ref.
1	Oscar Straus*	Secretary of Commerce and Labor	— (Note: Labor was only included in the presidential line of succession under the Presidential Succession Act of 1947.)	December 17, 1906	March 5, 1909	Republican	Theodore Roosevelt (1901–1909)	
2	Henry Morgenthau*	Secretary of the Treasury	3 (Note: Speaker of the House and Senate pro tempore were not included in the presidential line of succession until the Presidential Succession Act of 1947.)	January 1, 1934	July 22, 1945	Democratic	Franklin D. Roosevelt (1933–1945)	
2	Henry Morgenthau*	Secretary of the Treasury	3	January 1, 1934	July 22, 1945	Democratic	Harry S. Truman (1945–1953)	
3	Arthur Goldberg	Secretary of Labor	13	January 21, 1961	September 20, 1962	Democratic	John F. Kennedy (1961–1963)	
4	Abraham Ribicoff*	Secretary of Health, Education, and Welfare	13	January 21, 1961	July 13, 1962	Democratic	John F. Kennedy (1961–1963)	
5	Wilbur J. Cohen	Secretary of Health, Education, and Welfare	13	May 16, 1968	January 20, 1969	Democratic	Lyndon B. Johnson (1963–1969)	
6	Henry Kissinger*	Secretary of State	4 (Note: Ineligible to serve in the line of succession due to being a naturalized citizen and not a natural-born citizen.)	September 22, 1973	January 20, 1977	Republican	Richard Nixon (1969–1974)	
6	Henry Kissinger*	Secretary of State	4	September 22, 1973	January 20, 1977	Republican	Gerald Ford (1974–1977)	
7	Edward H. Levi*	Attorney General	7	January 14, 1975	January 20, 1977	Republican	Gerald Ford (1974–1977)	
8	Harold Brown*	Secretary of Defense	6	January 20, 1977	January 20, 1981	Democratic	Jimmy Carter (1977–1981)	
9	W. Michael Blumenthal	Secretary of the Treasury	5	January 23, 1977	August 4, 1979	Democratic	Jimmy Carter (1977–1981)	
10	Neil Goldschmidt*	Secretary of Transportation	13	August 15, 1979	January 20, 1981	Democratic	Jimmy Carter (1977–1981)	
11	Philip Klutznick	Secretary of Commerce	10	January 9, 1980	January 20, 1981	Democratic	Jimmy Carter (1977–1981)	
12	Robert Mosbacher	Secretary of Commerce	10	January 31, 1989	January 15, 1992	Republican	George H. W. Bush (1989–1993)	
13	Robert Reich	Secretary of Labor	11	January 22, 1993	January 20, 1997	Democratic	Bill Clinton (1993–2001)	
14	Robert Rubin	Secretary of the Treasury	5	January 11, 1995	July 2, 1999	Democratic	Bill Clinton (1993–2001)	
15	Dan Glickman*	Secretary of Agriculture	9	March 30, 1995	January 20, 2001	Democratic	Bill Clinton (1993–2001)	
16	Mickey Kantor	Secretary of Commerce	10	April 12, 1996	January 21, 1997	Democratic	Bill Clinton (1993–2001)	
17	William Cohen	Secretary of Defense	6	January 24, 1997	January 20, 2001	Republican	Bill Clinton (1993–2001)	
18	Lawrence Summers	Secretary of the Treasury	5	July 2, 1999	January 20, 2001	Democratic	Bill Clinton (1993–2001)	
19	Michael Chertoff*	Secretary of Homeland Security	18	February 15, 2005	January 21, 2009	Republican	George W. Bush (2001–2009)	
20	Michael Mukasey	Attorney General	7	November 9, 2007	January 20, 2009	Republican	George W. Bush (2001–2009)	
21	Jack Lew	Secretary of the Treasury	5	February 28, 2013	January 20, 2017	Democratic	Barack Obama (2009–2017)	
22	Penny Pritzker	Secretary of Commerce	10	June 26, 2013	January 20, 2017	Democratic	Barack Obama (2009–2017)	
23	Steven Mnuchin	Secretary of the Treasury	5	February 13, 2017	January 20, 2021	Republican	Donald Trump (2017–2021)	
24	David Shulkin*	Secretary of Veteran Affairs	17	February 14, 2017	March 28, 2018	Independent	Donald Trump (2017–2021)	
25	Antony Blinken	Secretary of State	4	January 26, 2021	January 20, 2025	Democratic	Joe Biden (2021–2025)	
26	Janet Yellen	Secretary of the Treasury	5	January 26, 2021	January 20, 2025	Democratic	Joe Biden (2021–2025)	
27	Alejandro Mayorkas	Secretary of Homeland Security	18	February 2, 2021	January 20, 2025	Democratic	Joe Biden (2021–2025)	
28	Merrick Garland	Attorney General	7	March 11, 2021	January 20, 2025	Democratic	Joe Biden (2021–2025)	
29	Howard Lutnick	Secretary of Commerce	10	February 21, 2025	Incumbent	Republican	Donald Trump (2025–present)	

== Cabinet-level officials ==
The president may designate or remove additional officials as cabinet members. These positions have not always been in the cabinet, so some Jewish American officeholders may not be listed.

The following list includes Jewish Americans who have held cabinet-rank positions, which can vary under each president. They are not in the line of succession and are not necessarily officers of the United States. The table below is organized based on the beginning of their terms in office while it was raised to cabinet-level status. Officeholders whose terms begin the same day are listed alphabetically by last name.

* denotes the first Jewish holder of that particular office

No.	Name	Office	Start	End	Party	President(s)	Ref.
1	Arthur Goldberg*	United States Ambassador to the United Nations	July 28, 1965	June 24, 1968	Democratic	Lyndon B. Johnson (1963–1969)	
2	Robert S. Strauss*	United States Trade Representative	March 30, 1977	August 17, 1979	Democratic	Jimmy Carter (1977–1981)	
3	Kenneth Duberstein*	White House Chief of Staff	July 1, 1988	January 20, 1989	Republican	Ronald Reagan (1981–1989)	
4	Mickey Kantor	United States Trade Representative	January 22, 1993	April 12, 1996	Democratic	Bill Clinton (1993–2001)	
5	John M. Deutch*	Director of Central Intelligence	May 10, 1995	December 15, 1996	Democratic	Bill Clinton (1993–2001)	
6	Joseph Stiglitz*	Chair of the Council of Economic Advisers	June 28, 1995	February 10, 1997	Democratic	Bill Clinton (1993–2001)	
7	Janet Yellen	Chair of the Council of Economic Advisers	February 18, 1997	August 3, 1999	Democratic	Bill Clinton (1993–2001)	
8	Charlene Barshefsky	United States Trade Representative	March 18, 1997	January 20, 2001	Democratic	Bill Clinton (1993–2001)	
9	Jack Lew*	Director of the Office of Management and Budget	May 21, 1998	January 19, 2001	Democratic	Bill Clinton (1993–2001)	
10	Joshua Bolten	Director of the Office of Management and Budget	June 26, 2003	April 14, 2006	Republican	George W. Bush (2001–2009)	
10	Joshua Bolten	White House Chief of Staff	April 14, 2006	January 20, 2009	Republican	George W. Bush (2001–2009)	
11	Rahm Emanuel	White House Chief of Staff	January 20, 2009	October 1, 2010	Democratic	Barack Obama (2009–2017)	
12	Peter Orszag	Director of the Office of Management and Budget	January 20, 2009	July 30, 2010	Democratic	Barack Obama (2009–2017)	
13	Jack Lew	Director of the Office of Management and Budget	November 18, 2010	January 27, 2012	Democratic	Barack Obama (2009–2017)	
13	Jack Lew	White House Chief of Staff	January 27, 2012	January 20, 2013	Democratic	Barack Obama (2009–2017)	
14	Alan Krueger	Chair of the Council of Economic Advisers	November 7, 2011	August 2, 2013	Democratic	Barack Obama (2009–2017)	
15	Michael Froman	United States Trade Representative	June 21, 2013	January 20, 2017	Democratic	Barack Obama (2009–2017)	
16	Jason Furman	Chair of the Council of Economic Advisers	August 2, 2013	January 20, 2017	Democratic	Barack Obama (2009–2017)	
17	Ron Klain	White House Chief of Staff	January 20, 2021	February 8, 2023	Democratic	Joe Biden (2021–2025)	
18	Avril Haines*	Director of National Intelligence	January 21, 2021	January 20, 2025	Democratic	Joe Biden (2021–2025)	
19	Eric Lander*	Director of the Office of Science and Technology Policy	June 2, 2021	February 18, 2022	Democratic	Joe Biden (2021–2025)	
20	Jeffrey Zients	White House Chief of Staff	February 8, 2023	January 20, 2025	Democratic	Joe Biden (2021–2025)	
21	Jared Bernstein	Chair of the Council of Economic Advisers	July 10, 2023	January 20, 2025	Democratic	Joe Biden (2021–2025)	
22	Lee Zeldin*	Administrator of the Environmental Protection Agency	January 29, 2025	Incumbent	Republican	Donald Trump (2025–present)	
23	Stephen Miller	White House Chief of Staff	November 9, 2026	Incumbent	Republican	Donald Trump (2025–present)	

== See also ==
- List of Jewish American politicians
  - List of Jewish members of the United States Congress
  - List of Jewish political milestones in the United States
- List of Hispanic and Latino American United States Cabinet members
- List of African-American United States Cabinet members
- List of female United States Cabinet members
- List of foreign-born United States Cabinet members
