= List of foreign-born United States Cabinet members =

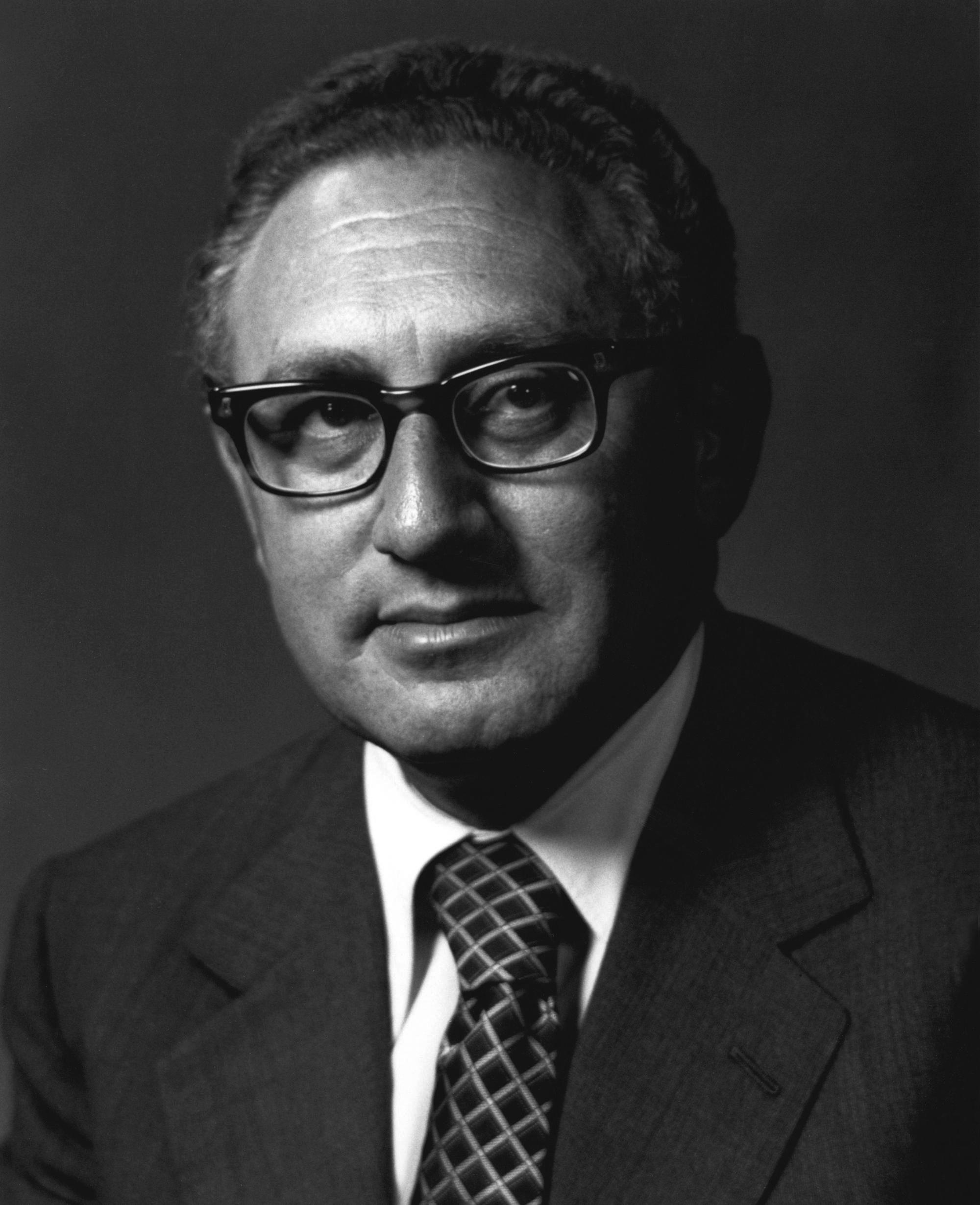
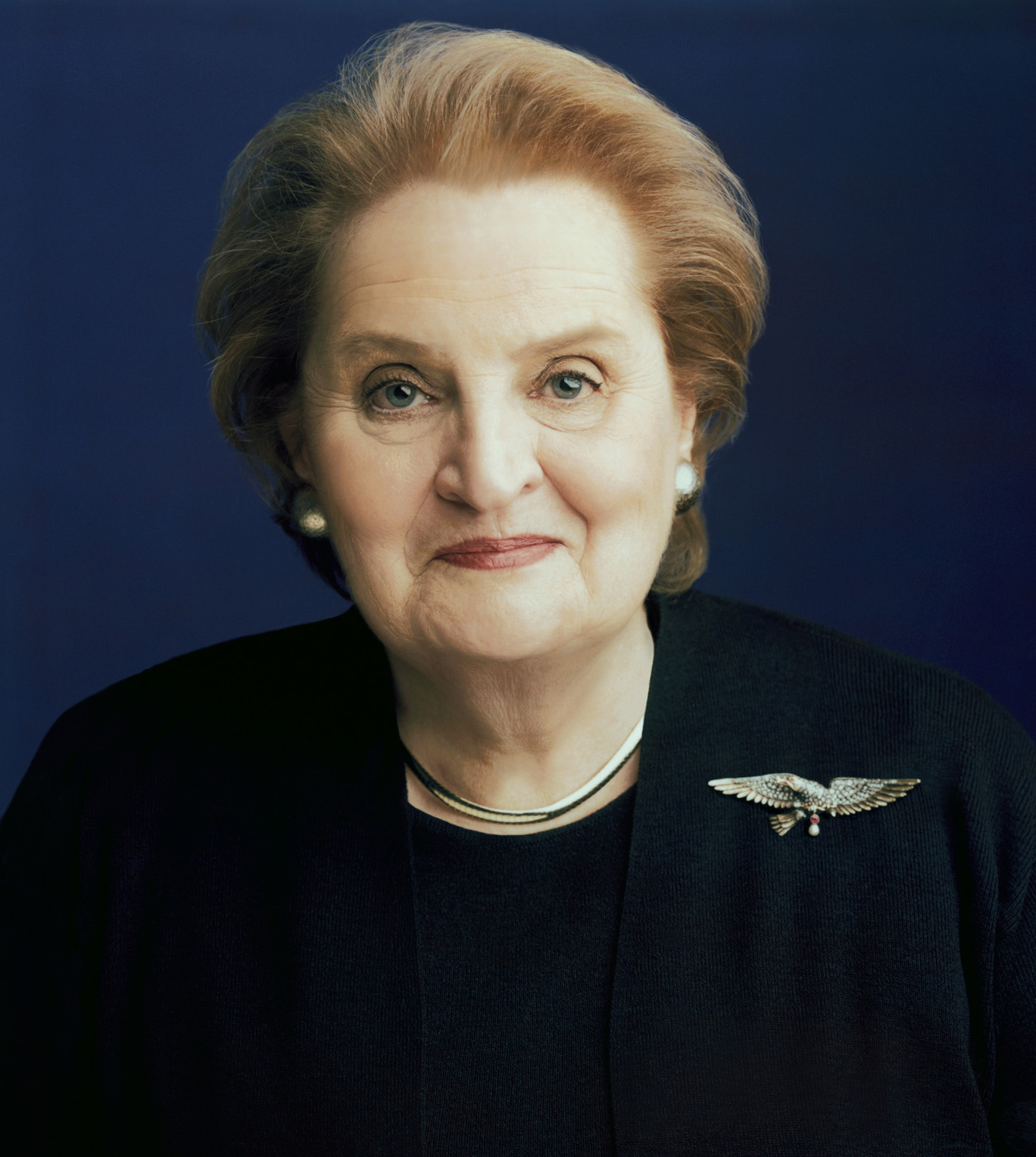
Henry Kissinger (left) and Madeleine Albright (right) are the highest-ranking foreign-born citizens to lead a federal executive department; each held the post of Secretary of State.

As of 2023, there have been 23 members appointed to the Cabinet of the United States who had been born outside the present-day United States.

Alexander Hamilton, one of the Founding Fathers who signed the U.S. Constitution, was the first cabinet member to be born outside of the United States. President George Washington appointed Hamilton, born in Nevis in 1755 or in 1757, as the United States' first secretary of the treasury in 1789. Irish-born James McHenry, whom Washington appointed as Secretary of War in 1796 and who served in the same post in John Adams's administration, was the other foreign-born individual in Washington's cabinet.

Albert Gallatin, born in the Republic of Geneva (in present-day Switzerland) in 1761, became the third foreign-born member of the cabinet when named Secretary of the Treasury by President Thomas Jefferson in 1801. Gallatin, his successor George W. Campbell, William J. Duane, Carl Schurz, and James Wilson were the only foreign-born members to hold cabinet positions in the 19th century. In the 20th century, nine foreign-born individuals were appointed to the cabinet, including German-born Oscar Straus and Mexican-born George Romney (George Romney, born to American parents, became the father of former governor of Massachusetts, 2012 Republican U.S. presidential candidate and former U.S. Senator from Utah Mitt Romney.) During the 2001 to 2009 presidency of President George W. Bush, three foreign-born individuals became members of his cabinet—Elaine Chao and Mel Martínez in 2001; Carlos Gutierrez in 2005.

The Department of the Treasury has had the most foreign-born secretaries, with five. The Department of Labor and the Department of the Interior follow with three, and the Departments of Housing and Urban Development and State have each had two. Former secretaries of state Henry Kissinger and Madeleine Albright were the highest-ranking foreign-born cabinet members ever in accordance to the United States presidential line of succession. The majority of foreign-born cabinet members were born in Europe. Most European-born cabinet members originated from the United Kingdom and Germany (with five and four respectively), and the others were born in Ireland, Czechoslovakia, Switzerland, and Italy. Four cabinet members were born in the Americas, and one was born in Asia. The Departments of Defense, Justice, Health and Human Services, and Education have not had foreign-born secretaries.

Since most foreign-born cabinet members are not natural-born citizens—meaning that they were not born in the United States or born abroad to American parents—they are ineligible to exercise the powers of the president of the United States in the event that "neither a President nor Vice President" is able to "discharge the powers and duties" of the presidency as specified in the Presidential Succession Act of 1947. A notable exception was HUD secretary George W. Romney, who was a birthright U.S. citizen because his parents were U.S. citizens and, in fact, had been a candidate in the Republican presidential primaries the prior year.

== Permanent cabinet members ==
The Department of Defense was established in 1947; no foreign-born person has served yet. The Department of Justice was established in 1870; no foreign-born person has served as Attorney General yet. The Department of Education was established in 1979; no foreign-born person has served yet.

* denotes the first foreign-born secretary of that particular department

Name	Office	Start	End	Birth Country (Note: Noting the current equivalent and its name at the time of birth.)	Party	President(s)	Ref.
Alexander Hamilton*	Secretary of the Treasury	September 11, 1789	January 31, 1795	Saint Kitts and Nevis (then the British Leeward Islands)	Federalist	George Washington (1789–1797)	
James McHenry*	Secretary of War	January 27, 1796	May 13, 1800	United Kingdom (then the Kingdom of Ireland)	Federalist	George Washington (1789–1797)	
James McHenry*	Secretary of War	January 27, 1796	May 13, 1800	United Kingdom (then the Kingdom of Ireland)	Federalist	John Adams (1797–1801)	
Albert Gallatin	Secretary of the Treasury	May 14, 1801	February 8, 1814	Switzerland (then the Republic of Geneva)	Democratic-Republican	Thomas Jefferson (1801–1809)	
George W. Campbell	Secretary of the Treasury	February 9, 1814	October 5, 1814	United Kingdom	Democratic-Republican	James Madison (1809–1817)	
William J. Duane	Secretary of the Treasury	May 29, 1833	September 22, 1833	Ireland (then part of the United Kingdom)	Democratic	Andrew Jackson (1829–1837)	
Carl Schurz*	Secretary of the Interior	March 12, 1877	March 7, 1881	Germany (then Prussia)	Republican	Rutherford B. Hayes (1877–1881)	
James Wilson*	Secretary of Agriculture	March 6, 1897	March 3, 1913	United Kingdom	Republican	William McKinley (1897–1901)	
James Wilson*	Secretary of Agriculture	March 6, 1897	March 3, 1913	United Kingdom	Republican	Theodore Roosevelt (1901–1909)	
James Wilson*	Secretary of Agriculture	March 6, 1897	March 3, 1913	United Kingdom	Republican	William Howard Taft (1909–1913)	
Oscar Straus*	Secretary of Commerce and Labor	December 17, 1906	March 5, 1909	Germany (then the Kingdom of Bavaria)	Republican	Theodore Roosevelt (1901–1909)	
William B. Wilson*	Secretary of Labor	March 5, 1913	March 5, 1921	United Kingdom	Democratic	Woodrow Wilson (1913–1921)	
Franklin Lane	Secretary of the Interior	March 6, 1913	March 1, 1920	Canada (then Prince Edward Island)	Democratic	Woodrow Wilson (1913–1921)	
James J. Davis	Secretary of Labor	March 5, 1921	November 30, 1930	United Kingdom	Republican	Warren G. Harding (1921–1923)	
James J. Davis	Secretary of Labor	March 5, 1921	November 30, 1930	United Kingdom	Republican	Calvin Coolidge (1923–1929)	
James J. Davis	Secretary of Labor	March 5, 1921	November 30, 1930	United Kingdom	Republican	Herbert Hoover (1929–1933)	
Anthony J. Celebrezze*	Secretary of Health, Education, and Welfare	July 31, 1962	August 17, 1965	Italy	Democratic	John F. Kennedy (1961–1963)	
Anthony J. Celebrezze*	Secretary of Health, Education, and Welfare	July 31, 1962	August 17, 1965	Italy	Democratic	Lyndon B. Johnson (1963–1969)	
George W. Romney*	Secretary of Housing and Urban Development	January 22, 1969	January 20, 1973	Mexico	Republican	Richard Nixon (1969–1974)	
Henry Kissinger*	Secretary of State	September 22, 1973	January 20, 1977	Germany	Republican	Richard Nixon (1969–1974)	
Henry Kissinger*	Secretary of State	September 22, 1973	January 20, 1977	Germany	Republican	Gerald Ford (1974–1977)	
W. Michael Blumenthal	Secretary of the Treasury	January 23, 1977	August 4, 1979	Germany	Democratic	Jimmy Carter (1977–1981)	
Madeleine Albright	Secretary of State	January 23, 1997	January 20, 2001	Czech Republic (then Czechoslovakia)	Democratic	Bill Clinton (1993–2001)	
Mel Martínez	Secretary of Housing and Urban Development	January 24, 2001	August 13, 2004	Cuba	Republican	George W. Bush (2001–2009)	
Elaine Chao	Secretary of Labor	January 29, 2001	January 20, 2009	Taiwan	Republican	George W. Bush (2001–2009)	
Carlos Gutierrez*	Secretary of Commerce	February 7, 2005	January 20, 2009	Cuba	Republican	George W. Bush (2001–2009)	
Sally Jewell	Secretary of the Interior	April 12, 2013	January 20, 2017	United Kingdom	Democratic	Barack Obama (2009–2017)	
Elaine Chao*	Secretary of Transportation	January 31, 2017	January 11, 2021	Taiwan	Republican	Donald Trump (2017–2021)	
Robert Wilkie*	Secretary of Veterans Affairs	July 30, 2018	January 20, 2021	Germany (then West Germany)	Republican	Donald Trump (2017–2021)	
Alejandro Mayorkas*	Secretary of Homeland Security	February 2, 2021	January 20, 2025	Cuba	Democratic	Joe Biden (2021–2025)	
Jennifer Granholm*	Secretary of Energy	February 25, 2021	January 20, 2025	Canada	Democratic	Joe Biden (2021–2025)	

== Cabinet-level officials ==
The president may designate additional officials as members of the cabinet. These positions have not always been in the cabinet, so some female officeholders may not be listed.

The following list includes those who were born outside of the United States and have held cabinet-level positions other than the 15 executive departments.

* denotes the first foreign-born head of that particular agency

Name	Office	Start	End	Birth Country	Party	President(s)	Ref.
Zbigniew Brzezinski*	National Security Advisor	January 20, 1977	January 20, 1981	Poland	Democratic	Jimmy Carter (1977–1981)	
Madeleine Albright*	Ambassador to the United Nations	January 27, 1993	January 21, 1997	Czech Republic (then Czechoslovakia)	Democratic	Bill Clinton (1993–2001)	
John M. Deutch*	Director of Central Intelligence	May 10, 1995	December 15, 1996	Belgium	Democratic	Bill Clinton (1993–2001)	
Samantha Power	Ambassador to the United Nations	August 5, 2013	January 20, 2017	United Kingdom	Democratic	Barack Obama (2009–2017)	
Maria Contreras-Sweet*	Administrator of the Small Business Administration	April 7, 2014	January 20, 2017	Mexico	Democratic	Barack Obama (2009–2017)	
Arati Prabhakar*	Director of the Office of Science and Technology Policy	October 3, 2022	January 20, 2025	India	Democratic	Joe Biden (2021–2025)	

== See also ==
- List of African-American United States Cabinet members
- List of female United States Cabinet members
- List of Hispanic and Latino American United States Cabinet members
- List of Jewish United States Cabinet members
- List of United States senators born outside the United States
- List of United States governors born outside the United States
