= List of African-American United States Cabinet members =

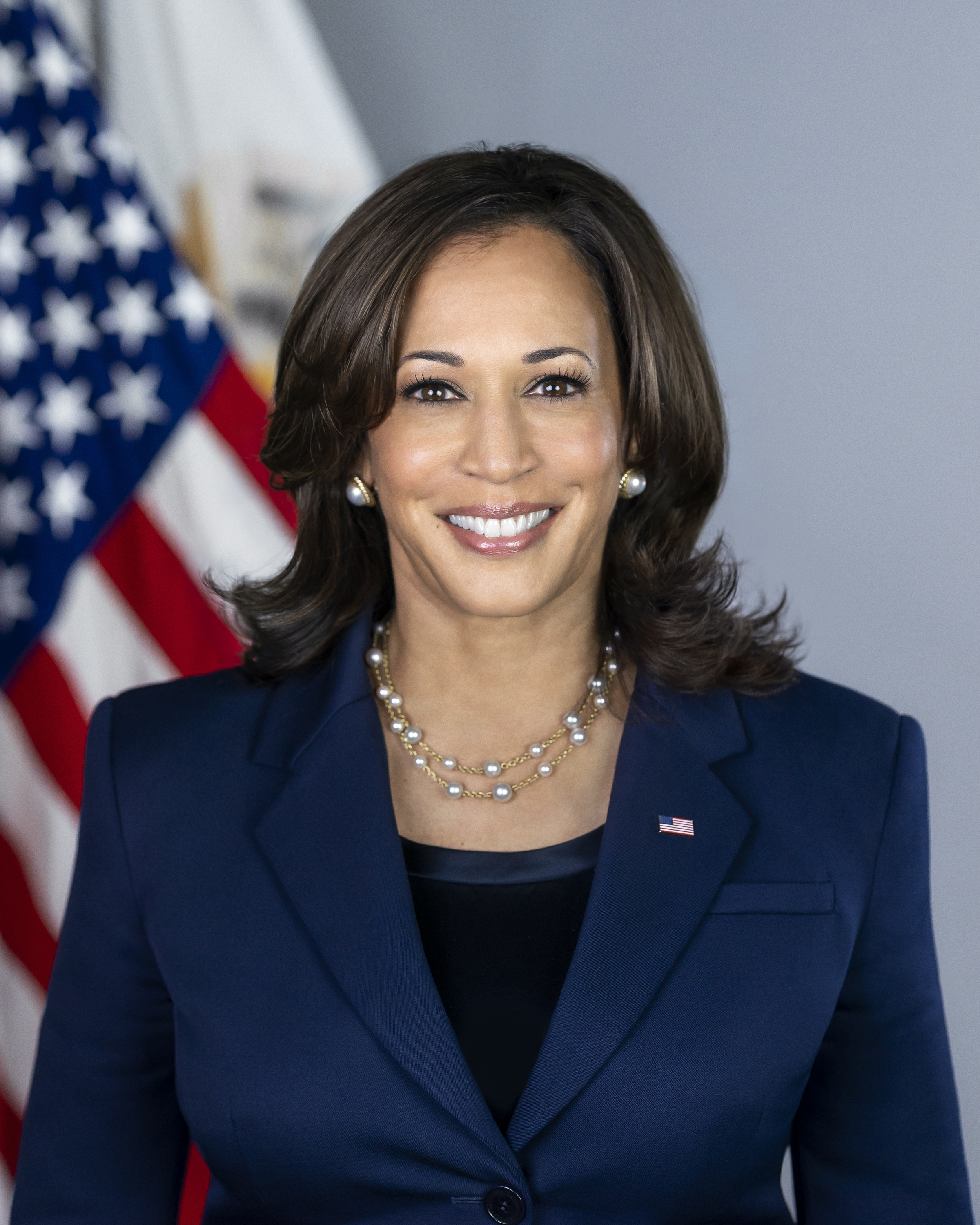
Kamala Harris is the highest-ranking black person to serve in a Cabinet as Vice President of the United States.

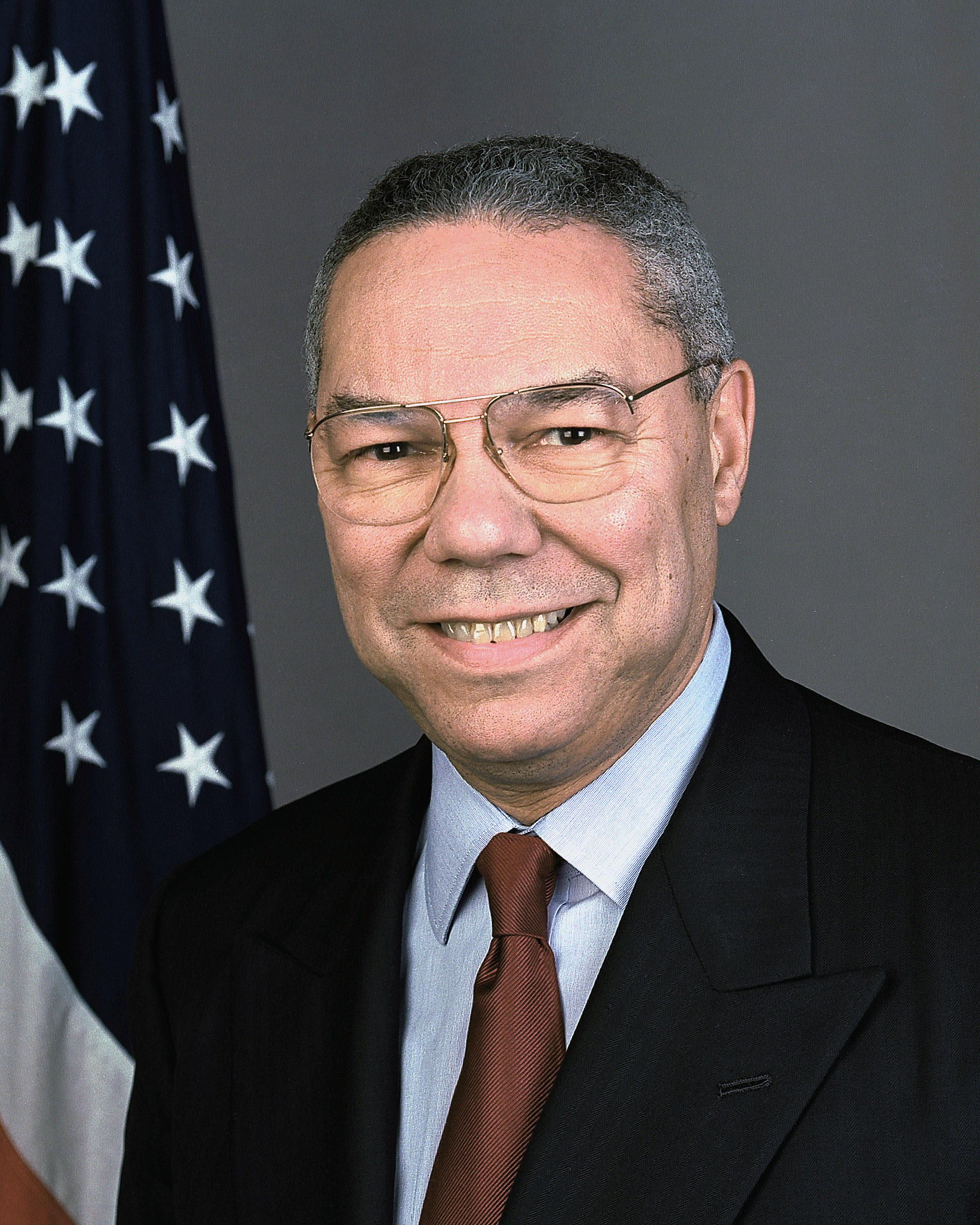
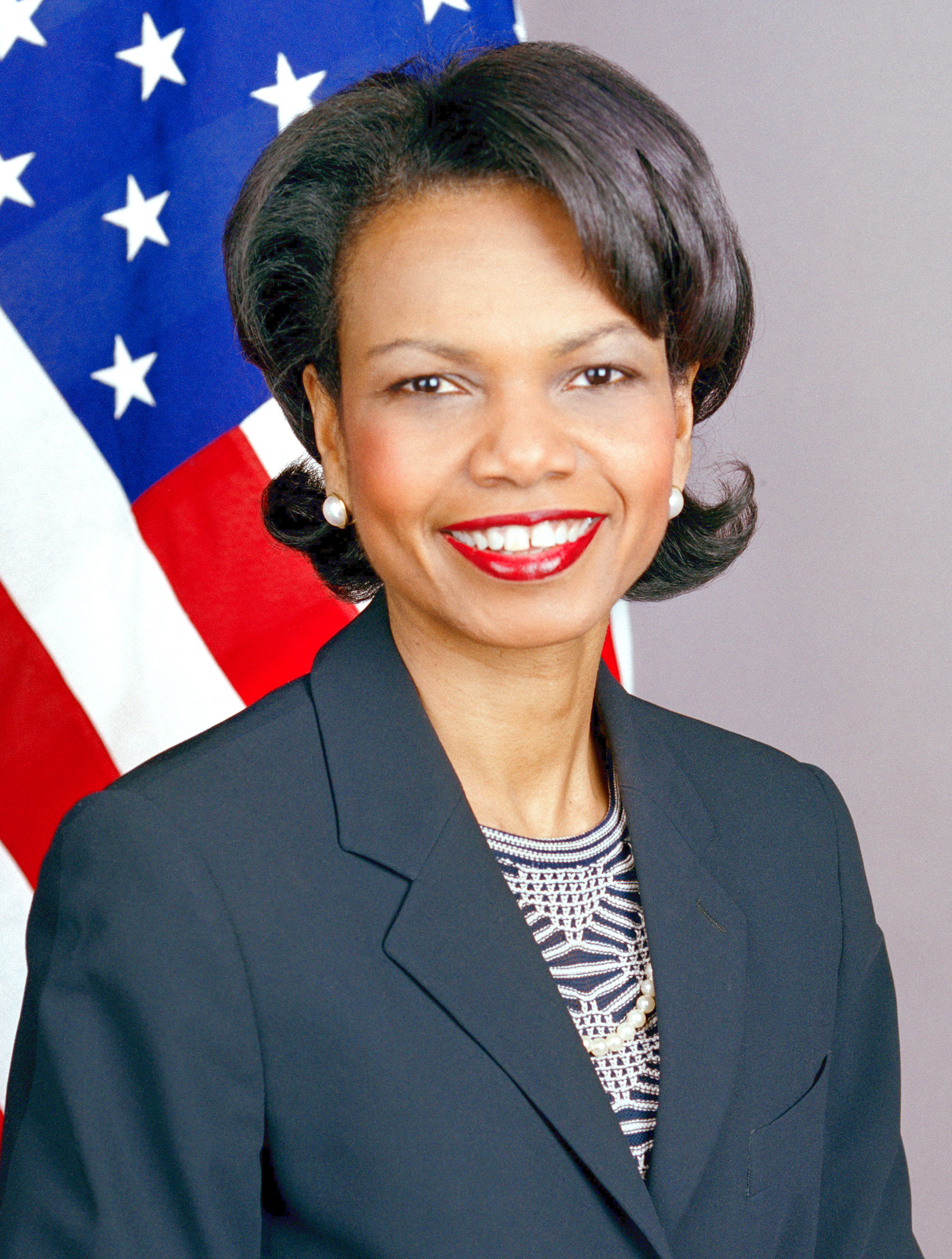
Colin Powell (left) and Condoleezza Rice (right) are the highest-ranking black Jamaican-American and Black-American to lead the federal executive department; each held the post of Secretary of State.

The Cabinet of the United States, which is the principal advisory body to the president of the United States, has had 37 African-American members altogether, with one of them serving in multiple different positions for a total of 38 cabinet appointments. Of that particular number, 26 different Black individuals held a total of 27 permanent cabinet posts, serving as the vice president or head of one of the federal executive departments, and 11 more held cabinet-level positions, which can differ under each president; no one officeholder served in both cabinet and cabinet-rank roles. The U.S. Census Bureau defines African Americans as citizens or residents of the United States who have origins in any of the black populations of Africa. The term is generally used for Americans with at least partial ancestry in any of the original peoples of sub-Saharan Africa. During the founding of the federal government, Black Americans were consigned to a status of second-class citizenship or enslaved. No African American ever held a cabinet position before the civil rights movement or the signing of the Civil Rights Act of 1964, which banned discrimination in public accommodations, employment, and labor unions.

Robert C. Weaver became the first Black-American to serve in a president's cabinet when he was appointed Secretary of Housing and Urban Development by President Lyndon B. Johnson in 1966. Patricia Roberts Harris was the first black woman to serve in a presidential cabinet when she was named to the same position by President Jimmy Carter in 1977. Two years later, Carter tapped her for Secretary of Health and Human services, (Note: The position was established as Secretary of Health, Education, and Welfare on April 11, 1953; renamed Secretary of Health and Human Services on May 4, 1980.) thus making her the first African-American to hold two different cabinet positions.

On January 20, 2001, Colin Powell assumed the post of Secretary of State under President George W. Bush, which made him the highest-ranked black Jamaican-American among cabinet secretaries to enter the presidential line of succession, standing fourth. Condoleezza Rice took over the same position in 2005, during Bush's second term, making her the highest-placed Black person in line to the presidency. Kamala Harris replaced both Powell and Rice to become the highest-ranking black person ever to be in the line of succession upon being inaugurated as the first black Jamaican/Indian-American vice president on January 20, 2021, alongside President Joe Biden.

President Bill Clinton named the most African-Americans as secretaries to his first-term cabinet, with four: former U.S. representative Mike Espy (D-MS) as Secretary of Agriculture; DNC chairman Ron Brown as Secretary of Commerce; corporate director Hazel R. O'Leary as Secretary of Energy; and DAV executive director Jesse Brown as Secretary of Veterans affairs. Clinton exceeded that record by three, including cabinet reshuffles during his second term in office.

The Department of Housing and Urban Development has had the most African-American secretaries, with seven. The Department of Transportation has had three; the Departments of Education, Health and Human Services, Justice, State, and Veterans Affairs have had two; the Departments of Agriculture, Commerce, Defense, Energy, Homeland Security, and Labor have had one. The Departments of the Interior and the Treasury are the only existing executive departments that have not yet had African-American secretaries.

The totals for this list include only African-American presidential appointees confirmed (if necessary) by the U.S. Senate to cabinet or cabinet-level positions and taking their oath of office; they do not include acting officials or nominees awaiting confirmation.

Barack Obama, the 44th president of the United States, is the most senior African American to have held a role related to the U.S. Cabinet. Although not officially a member, he held the unique position of chairing the Cabinet during his presidency.

== Permanent cabinet members ==
The following list includes African-Americans who have held permanent positions in the Cabinet, all of whom are in the line of succession to the presidency. The table below is organized based on the beginning of their terms in office. Officeholders whose terms begin the same day are listed according to the presidential order of succession.

* denotes the first African-American holder of that particular office

No.	Name	Office	Succession	Start	End	Party	President(s)	Ref.
1	Robert C. Weaver*	Secretary of Housing and Urban Development	14 (Note: Postmaster General was still a Cabinet position and ahead in line of succession.)	January 18, 1966	December 18, 1968	Democratic	Lyndon B. Johnson (1963–1969)	
2	Bill Coleman*	Secretary of Transportation	14	March 7, 1975	January 20, 1977	Republican	Gerald Ford (1974–1977)	
3/4	Patricia Harris	Secretary of Housing and Urban Development	13	January 23, 1977	September 10, 1979	Democratic	Jimmy Carter (1977–1981)	
3/4	Patricia Harris	Secretary of Health and Human Services	12	August 3, 1979	January 20, 1981	Democratic	Jimmy Carter (1977–1981)	
5	Samuel Pierce	Secretary of Housing and Urban Development	13	January 23, 1981	January 20, 1989	Republican	Ronald Reagan (1981–1989)	
6	Louis W. Sullivan	Secretary of Health and Human Services	12	March 1, 1989	January 20, 1993	Republican	George H. W. Bush (1989–1993)	
7	Mike Espy*	Secretary of Agriculture	9	January 22, 1993	December 31, 1994	Democratic	Bill Clinton (1993–2001)	
8	Ron Brown*	Secretary of Commerce	10	January 22, 1993	April 3, 1996	Democratic	Bill Clinton (1993–2001)	
9	Hazel R. O'Leary*	Secretary of Energy	15	January 22, 1993	January 20, 1997	Democratic	Bill Clinton (1993–2001)	
10	Jesse Brown*	Secretary of Veterans Affairs	17	January 22, 1993	July 13, 1997	Democratic	Bill Clinton (1993–2001)	
11	Rodney E. Slater	Secretary of Transportation	14	February 14, 1997	January 20, 2001	Democratic	Bill Clinton (1993–2001)	
12	Alexis Herman*	Secretary of Labor	11	May 1, 1997	January 20, 2001	Democratic	Bill Clinton (1993–2001)	
13	Togo D. West	Secretary of Veterans Affairs	17	May 4, 1998	July 25, 2000	Democratic	Bill Clinton (1993–2001)	
14	Colin Powell*	Secretary of State	4	January 20, 2001	January 26, 2005	Republican	George W. Bush (2001–2009)	
15	Rod Paige*	Secretary of Education	16	January 20, 2001	January 20, 2005	Republican	George W. Bush (2001–2009)	
16	Alphonso Jackson	Secretary of Housing and Urban Development	13	August 31, 2004	April 18, 2008	Republican	George W. Bush (2001–2009)	
17	Condoleezza Rice	Secretary of State	4	January 26, 2005	January 20, 2009	Republican	George W. Bush (2001–2009)	
18	Eric Holder*	Attorney General	7	February 3, 2009	April 27, 2015	Democratic	Barack Obama (2009–2017)	
19	Anthony Foxx	Secretary of Transportation	14	July 2, 2013	January 20, 2017	Democratic	Barack Obama (2009–2017)	
20	Jeh Johnson*	Secretary of Homeland Security	18	December 23, 2013	January 20, 2017	Democratic	Barack Obama (2009–2017)	
21	Loretta Lynch	Attorney General	7	April 27, 2015	January 20, 2017	Democratic	Barack Obama (2009–2017)	
22	John King	Secretary of Education	16	January 1, 2016	January 20, 2017	Democratic	Barack Obama (2009–2017)	
23	Ben Carson	Secretary of Housing and Urban Development	13	March 2, 2017	January 20, 2021	Republican	Donald Trump (2017–2021)	
24	Kamala Harris*	Vice President	1	January 20, 2021	January 20, 2025	Democratic	Joe Biden (2021–2025)	
25	Lloyd Austin*	Secretary of Defense	6	January 22, 2021	January 20, 2025	Democratic	Joe Biden (2021–2025)	
26	Marcia Fudge	Secretary of Housing and Urban Development	13	March 10, 2021	March 22, 2024	Democratic	Joe Biden (2021–2025)	
27	Scott Turner	Secretary of Housing and Urban Development	13	February 5, 2025	Incumbent	Republican	Donald Trump (2025–present)	

== Cabinet-level positions ==
The president may designate or remove additional officials as cabinet members. These positions have not always been in the cabinet, so some African American officeholders may not be listed.

The following list includes African-Americans who have held cabinet-rank positions, which can vary under each president. They are not in the line of succession and are not necessarily officers of the United States. The table below is organized based on the beginning of their terms in office while it was raised to cabinet-level status. Officeholders whose terms begin the same day are listed alphabetically by last name.

* denotes the first African-American holder of that particular office

No.	Name	Office	Start	End	Party	President(s)	Ref.
1	Andrew Young*	United States Ambassador to the United Nations	January 30, 1977	September 23, 1979	Democratic	Jimmy Carter (1977–1981)	
2	Donald McHenry	United States Ambassador to the United Nations	September 23, 1979	January 20, 1981	Democratic	Jimmy Carter (1977–1981)	
3	Edward J. Perkins	United States Ambassador to the United Nations	May 12, 1992	January 27, 1993	Republican	George H. W. Bush (1989–1993)	
4	Franklin Raines*	Director of the Office of Management and Budget	April 13, 1996	May 21, 1998	Democratic	Bill Clinton (1993–2001)	
5	Lisa P. Jackson*	Administrator of the Environmental Protection Agency	January 23, 2009	February 19, 2013	Democratic	Barack Obama (2009–2017)	
6	Susan Rice	United States Ambassador to the United Nations	January 26, 2009	June 30, 2013	Democratic	Barack Obama (2009–2017)	
7	Ron Kirk*	United States Trade Representative	March 18, 2009	March 15, 2013	Democratic	Barack Obama (2009–2017)	
8	Linda Thomas-Greenfield	United States Ambassador to the United Nations	February 25, 2021	January 20, 2025	Democratic	Joe Biden (2021–2025)	
9	Michael S. Regan	Administrator of the Environmental Protection Agency	March 11, 2021	December 31, 2024	Democratic	Joe Biden (2021–2025)	
10	Cecilia Rouse*	Chair of the Council of Economic Advisers	March 12, 2021	March 31, 2023	Democratic	Joe Biden (2021–2025)	
11	Shalanda Young	Director of the Office of Management and Budget	March 17, 2022	January 20, 2025	Democratic	Joe Biden (2021–2025)	

== See also ==
- African Americans in the United States Congress
  - List of African-American United States senators
  - List of African-American United States representatives
- Black Cabinet
- List of female United States Cabinet members
- List of first African-American mayors
- List of foreign-born United States Cabinet members
- List of Hispanic and Latino American United States Cabinet members
- List of Jewish United States Cabinet members
- List of minority governors and lieutenant governors in the United States
