= List of Hispanic and Latino American United States Cabinet members =

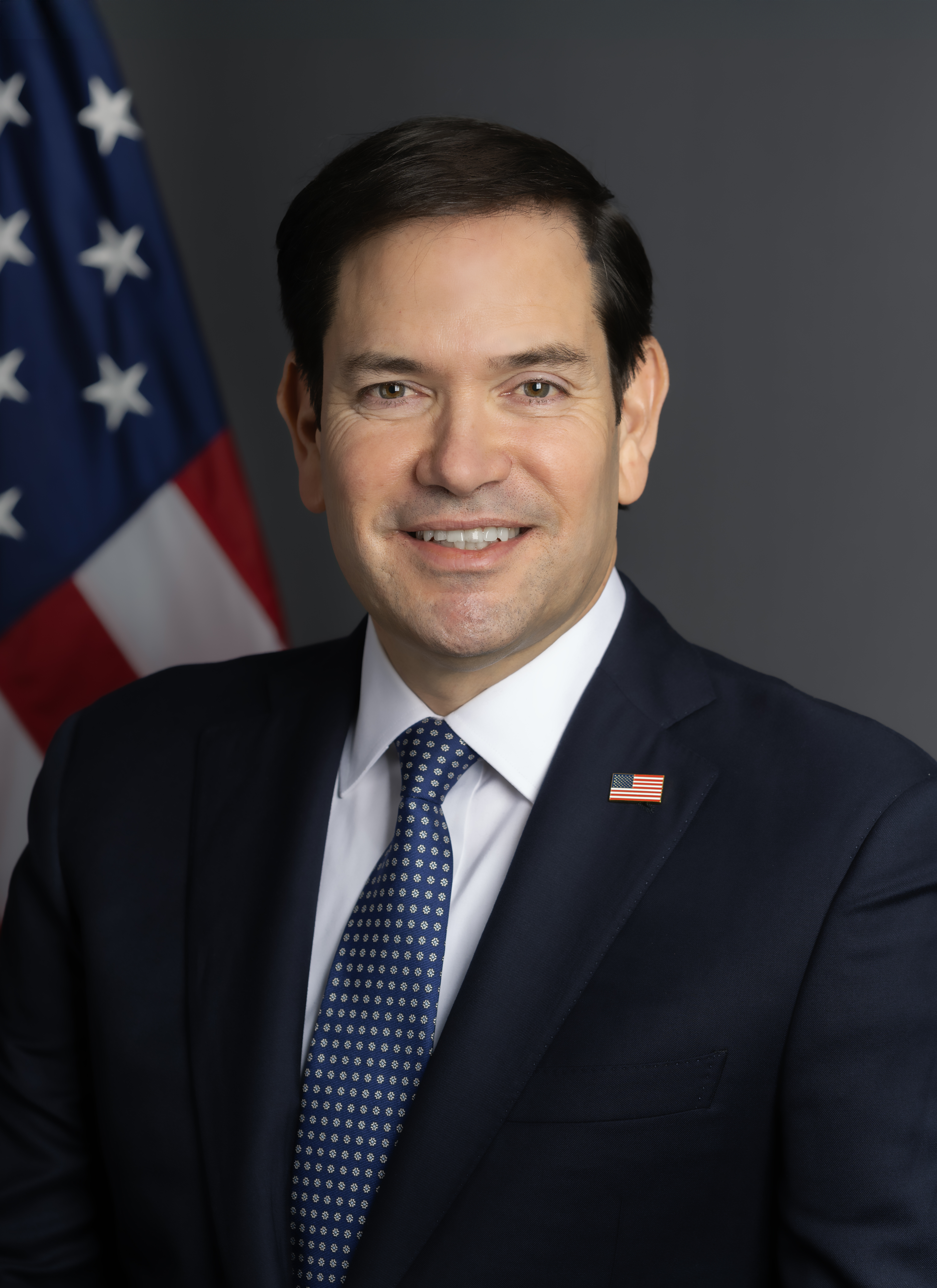
Marco Rubio is the highest-ranking Hispanic and Latino American to lead a federal executive department; he currently holds the post of Secretary of State.

The Cabinet of the United States, which is the principal advisory body to the president of the United States, has had 22 Hispanic and Latino American members altogether, with two of them serving in multiple positions for a total of 24 cabinet appointments. Of that number, 18 different Latino American individuals held a total of 19 permanent cabinet posts, having served as the heads of the federal executive departments; five more Latin Americans held cabinet-level positions, which can differ under each president; and one officeholder served in both cabinet and cabinet-rank roles. The U.S. Census Bureau defines Hispanic or Latino Americans as citizens or residents of the United States who have origins in Cuban, Mexican, Puerto Rican, South or Central American, or other Spanish culture or origin regardless of race. No Hispanic or Latino American ever held a cabinet position before the civil rights movement or the signing of the Civil Rights Act of 1964, which banned discrimination in public accommodations, employment, and labor unions.

Lauro Cavazos became the first Hispanic to serve in a president's cabinet when he was appointed Secretary of Education by President Ronald Reagan in 1988. Federico Peña was appointed Secretary of Transportation by President Bill Clinton in 1993 and served as Secretary of Energy during part of Clinton's second term, thus making him the first Latino American to hold two different cabinet positions. Aida Álvarez became the first Latina woman to serve in the president's cabinet when Clinton picked her for the cabinet-rank position of Administrator of the Small Business Administration in 1997. However, the first Latina to lead a permanent cabinet office was Hilda Solis when President Barack Obama appointed her Secretary of Labor in 2009. Mel Martínez, who was born in Cuba, became the first foreign-born Hispanic and Latino American to serve in the presidential cabinet when President George W. Bush named him Secretary of Housing and Urban Development in 2001. (Note: Ineligible to serve in the line of succession due to being a naturalized citizen and not a natural-born citizen.)

President Joe Biden named the most Hispanic and Latino Americans as secretaries to his initial Cabinet: former California attorney general Xavier Becerra as Secretary of Health and Human Services; Connecticut Education commissioner Miguel Cardona as Secretary of Education; and DHS deputy secretary Alejandro Mayorkas as Secretary of Homeland Security, exceeding by one the record set by President Bill Clinton and equaled by Barack Obama. However, including cabinet reshuffles during his second term in office, Obama still holds the record for most Hispanic and Latino Americans appointed to permanent cabinet positions with five, the most of any presidency, therefore surpassing Clinton's previous number of four.

The Departments of Education, Housing and Urban Development, and Labor have had the most Hispanic or Latino American secretaries with three. The Departments of Energy and Interior have had two; the Departments of Commerce, Health and Human Services, Homeland Security, Justice, State, and Transportation have had one. No Hispanic or Latino American has led departments of Agriculture, Defense, Treasury, or Veterans Affairs.

The totals for this list include only Hispanic and Latino American presidential appointees confirmed (if necessary) by the U.S. Senate to cabinet or cabinet-level positions and taking their oath of office; they do not include acting officials or nominees awaiting confirmation.

== Permanent cabinet members ==
The following list includes Hispanic and Latino Americans who have held permanent positions in the cabinet, all of whom are in the line of succession to the presidency. The table below is organized based on the beginning of their terms in office. Officeholders whose terms begin the same day are listed according to the presidential order of succession.

* denotes the first Hispanic and Latino American holder of that particular office

No.	Name	Office	Succession	Start	End	Party	President(s)	Ref.
1	Lauro Cavazos*	Secretary of Education	16	September 20, 1988	December 12, 1990	Republican	Ronald Reagan (1981–1989)	
1	Lauro Cavazos*	Secretary of Education	16	September 20, 1988	December 12, 1990	Republican	George H. W. Bush (1989–1993)	
2	Manuel Lujan Jr.*	Secretary of the Interior	8	February 3, 1989	January 20, 1993	Republican	George H. W. Bush (1989–1993)	
3	Federico Peña*	Secretary of Transportation	14	January 21, 1993	February 14, 1997	Democratic	Bill Clinton (1993–2001)	
4	Henry Cisneros*	Secretary of Housing and Urban Development	13	January 22, 1993	January 20, 1997	Democratic	Bill Clinton (1993–2001)	
5	Federico Peña*	Secretary of Energy	15	March 12, 1997	June 30, 1998	Democratic	Bill Clinton (1993–2001)	
6	Bill Richardson	Secretary of Energy	15	August 18, 1998	January 20, 2001	Democratic	Bill Clinton (1993–2001)	
7	Mel Martínez	Secretary of Housing and Urban Development	13	January 24, 2001	August 13, 2004	Republican	George W. Bush (2001–2009)	
8	Alberto Gonzales*	Attorney General	7	February 3, 2005	September 17, 2007	Republican	George W. Bush (2001–2009)	
9	Carlos Gutierrez*	Secretary of Commerce	10	February 7, 2005	January 20, 2009	Republican	George W. Bush (2001–2009)	
10	Ken Salazar	Secretary of the Interior	8	January 20, 2009	April 12, 2013	Democratic	Barack Obama (2009–2017)	
11	Hilda Solis*	Secretary of Labor	11	February 24, 2009	January 22, 2013	Democratic	Barack Obama (2009–2017)	
12	Tom Perez	Secretary of Labor	11	July 23, 2013	January 20, 2017	Democratic	Barack Obama (2009–2017)	
13	Julian Castro	Secretary of Housing and Urban Development	13	July 28, 2014	January 20, 2017	Democratic	Barack Obama (2009–2017)	
14	John King Jr.	Secretary of Education	16	January 1, 2016	January 20, 2017	Democratic	Barack Obama (2009–2017)	
15	Alexander Acosta	Secretary of Labor	11	April 28, 2017	July 19, 2019	Republican	Donald Trump (2017–2021)	
16	Alejandro Mayorkas*	Secretary of Homeland Security	18	February 2, 2021	January 20, 2025	Democratic	Joe Biden (2021–2025)	
17	Miguel Cardona	Secretary of Education	16	March 2, 2021	January 20, 2025	Democratic	Joe Biden (2021–2025)	
18	Xavier Becerra*	Secretary of Health and Human Services	12	March 19, 2021	January 20, 2025	Democratic	Joe Biden (2021–2025)	
19	Marco Rubio*	Secretary of State	4	January 21, 2025	Incumbent	Republican	Donald Trump (2025–present)	
20	Lori Chavez-DeRemer	Secretary of Labor	11	March 11, 2025	April 20, 2026	Republican	Donald Trump (2025–present)	

== Cabinet-level positions ==
The president may designate or remove additional officials as cabinet members. These positions have not always been in the cabinet, so some Hispanic and Latino American officeholders may not be listed.

The following list includes Hispanic and Latino Americans who have held cabinet-rank positions, which can vary under each president. They are not in the line of succession and are not necessarily officers of the United States. The table below is organized based on the beginning of their terms in office while it raised to cabinet-level status. Officeholders whose terms begin the same day are listed alphabetically by last name.

* denotes the first Hispanic and Latino American holder of that particular office

No.	Name	Office	Start	End	Party	President(s)	Ref.
1	Bill Richardson*	United States Ambassador to the United Nations	February 18, 1997	August 18, 1998	Democratic	Bill Clinton (1993–2001)	
2	Aida Álvarez*	Administrator of the Small Business Administration	March 7, 1997	January 19, 2001	Democratic	Bill Clinton (1993–2001)	
3	Maria Contreras-Sweet	Administrator of the Small Business Administration	April 7, 2014	January 20, 2017	Democratic	Barack Obama (2009–2017)	
4	Jovita Carranza	Administrator of the Small Business Administration	January 14, 2020	January 20, 2021	Republican	Donald Trump (2017–2021)	
5	Isabel Guzman	Administrator of the Small Business Administration	March 17, 2021	January 20, 2025	Democratic	Joe Biden (2021–2025)	

== See also ==
- Hispanic and Latino Americans in the United States Congress
  - List of Hispanic and Latino Americans in the United States Congress
- List of African-American United States Cabinet members
- List of Jewish United States Cabinet members
- List of female United States Cabinet members
- List of foreign-born United States Cabinet members
- List of minority governors and lieutenant governors in the United States
