= List of female United States Cabinet members =

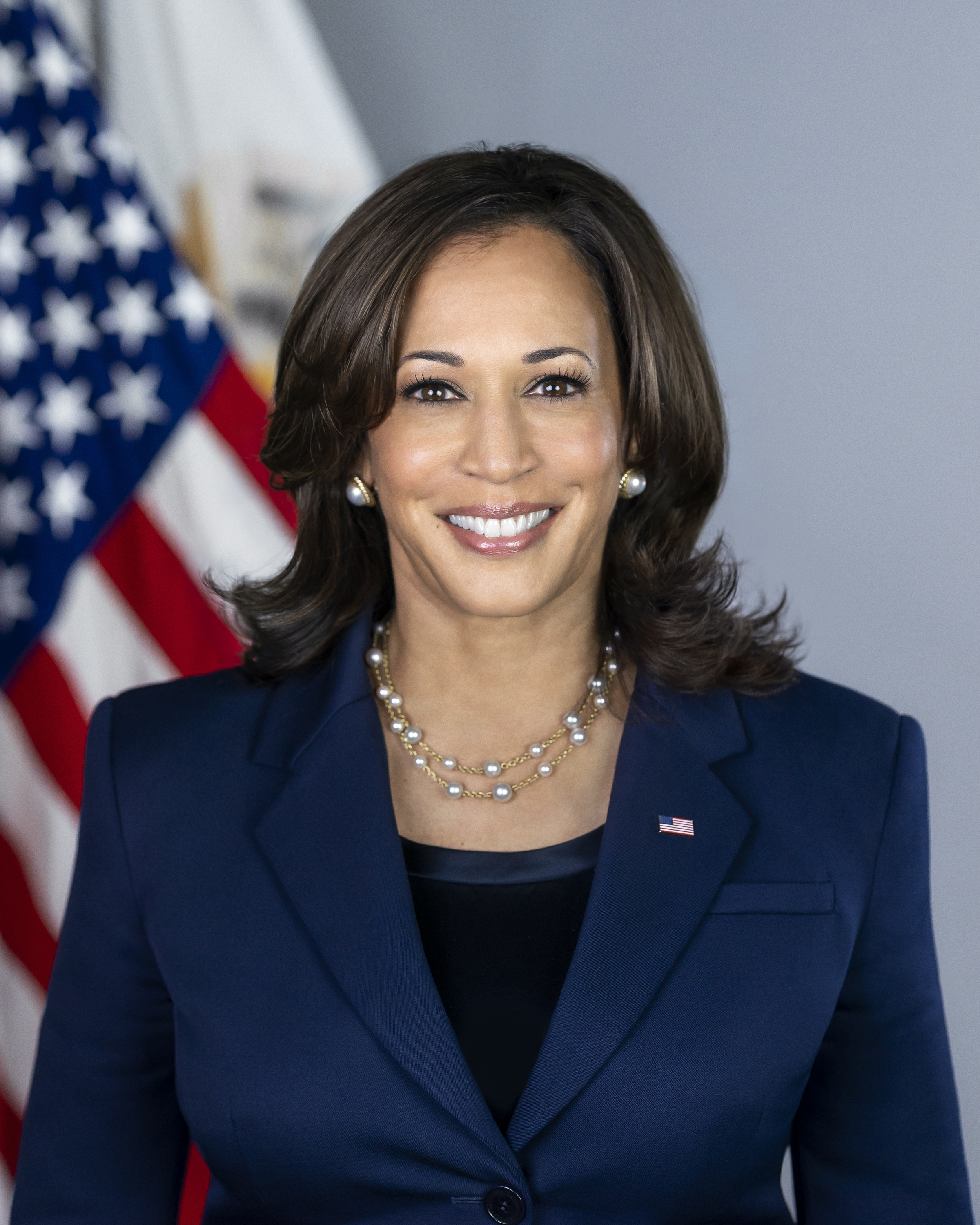
Kamala Harris is the highest-ranking woman to serve in a Cabinet as Vice President of the United States.

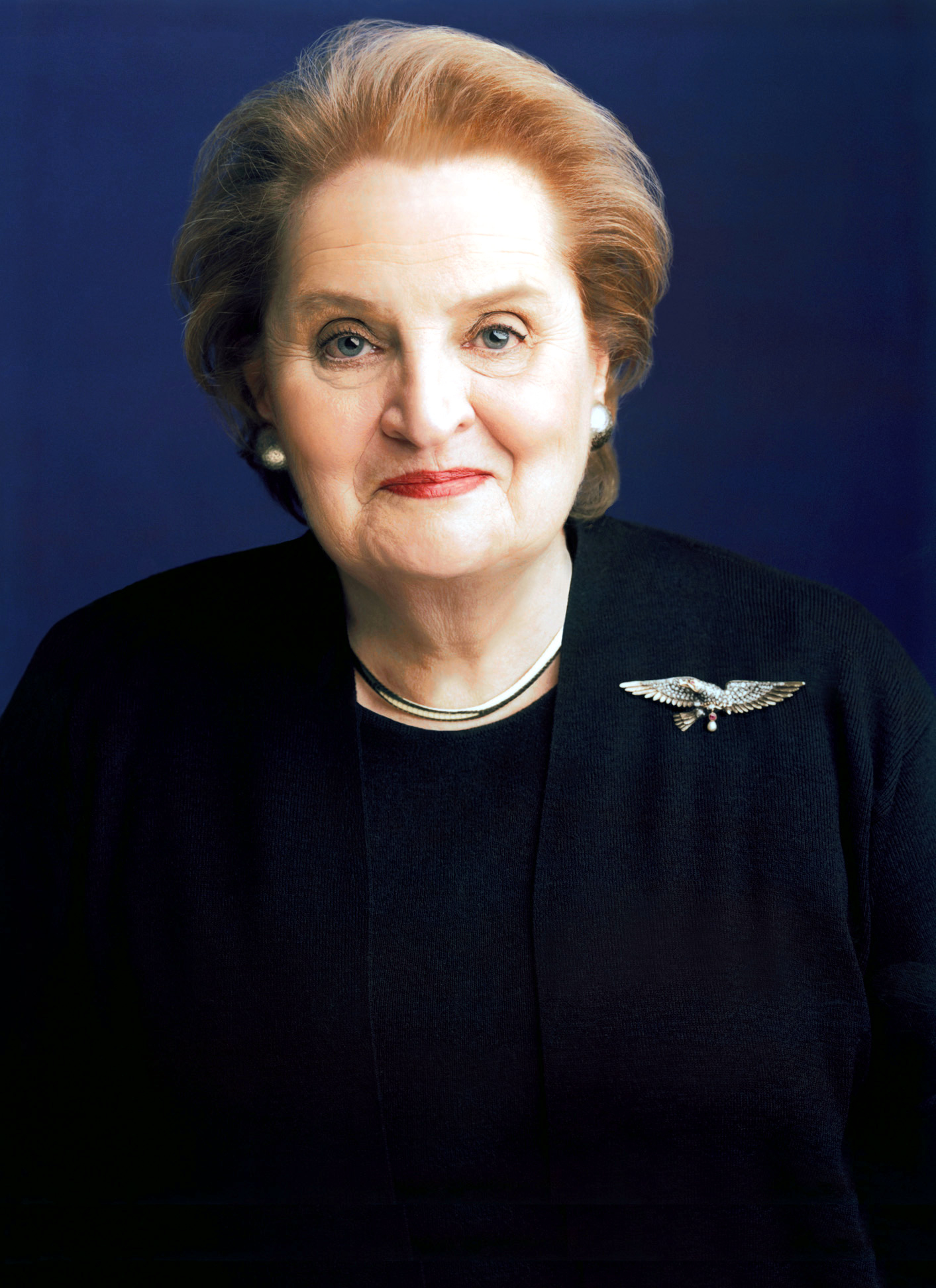
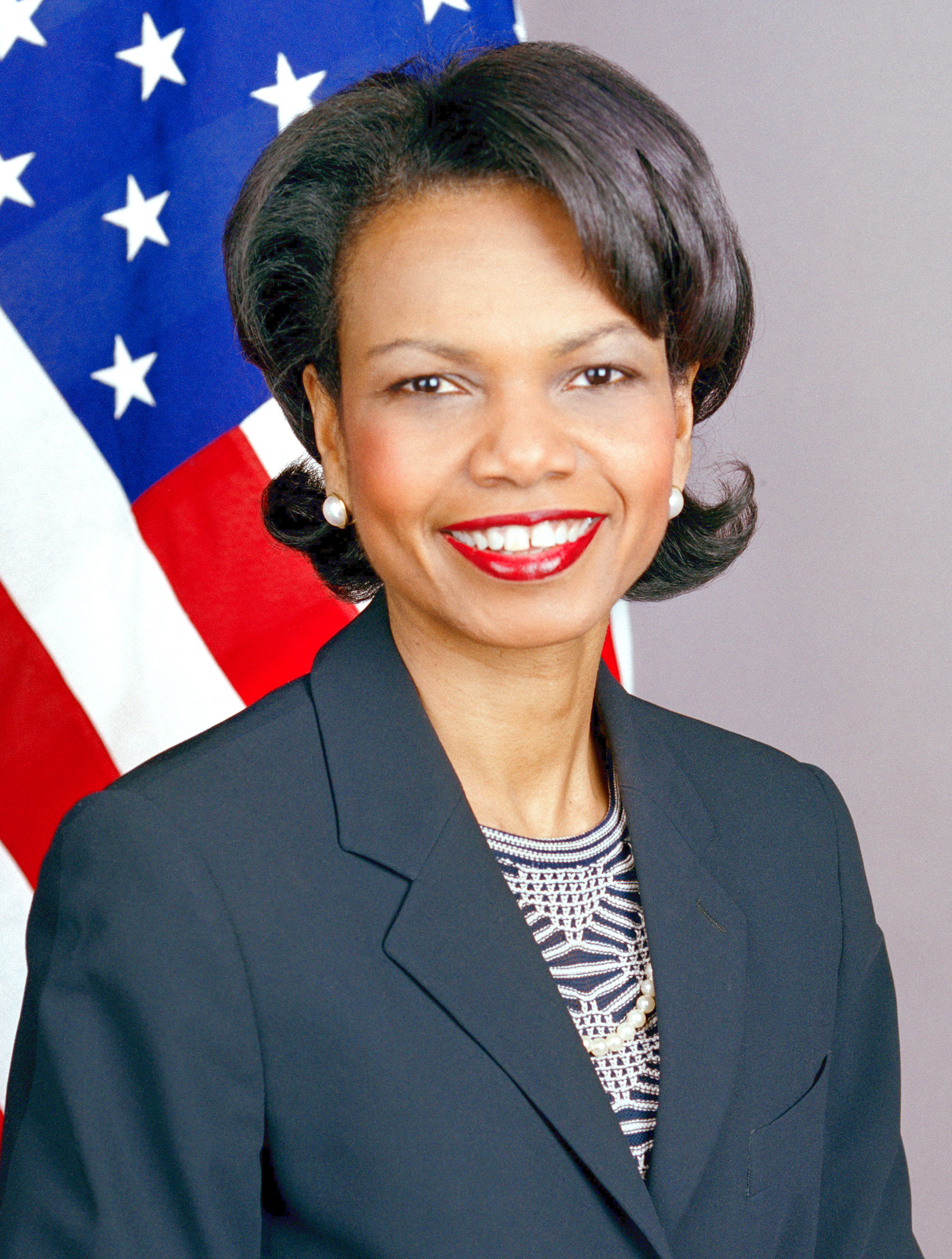
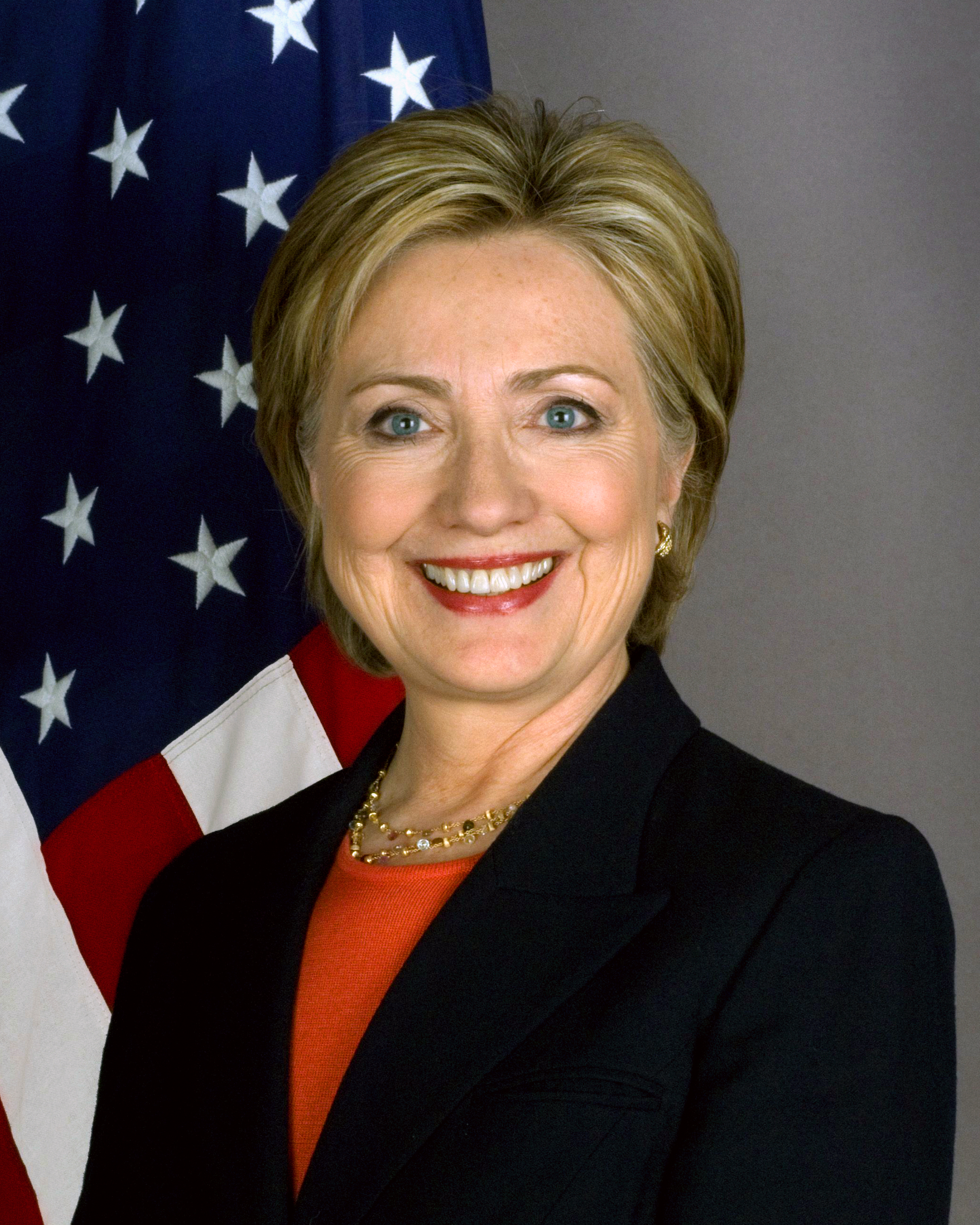
Madeleine Albright (left), Condoleezza Rice (center), and Hillary Clinton (right) are the highest-ranking women to lead a federal executive department; each held the post of Secretary of State.

The Cabinet of the United States, which is the principal advisory body to the president of the United States, has had 72 female members altogether, with eight of them serving in multiple positions for a total of 80 cabinet appointments. Of that number, 43 different women held a total of 46 permanent cabinet posts, having served as the vice president or heads of the federal executive departments; 34 more women held cabinet-level positions, which can differ under each president; and five officeholders served in both cabinet and cabinet-rank roles. No woman held a presidential cabinet position before the ratification of the 19th Amendment in 1920, which prohibits the federal government or any state from denying citizens the right to vote on the basis of sex.

Frances Perkins became the first woman to serve in a president's cabinet when she was appointed Secretary of Labor by President Franklin D. Roosevelt in 1933. Patricia Roberts Harris was the first African-American woman and the first woman of color to serve in a presidential cabinet when she was named Secretary of Housing and Urban Development by President Jimmy Carter in 1977. Two years later, Carter tapped her for Secretary of Health and Human Services, (Note: The position was established as Secretary of Health, Education, and Welfare on April 11, 1953; renamed Secretary of Health and Human Services on May 4, 1980.) therefore making her the first woman to hold two different cabinet positions. Madeleine Albright, who was born in Czechoslovakia, became the first foreign-born woman to serve in a president's cabinet when she was picked by President Bill Clinton for United States Ambassador to the United Nations, a cabinet-rank position, in 1993. She was elevated to Secretary of State four years later, during Clinton's second term, thus making her, at the time, the highest-ranking woman in the history of the federal government. (Note: Ineligible to serve in the line of succession due to being a naturalized citizen and not a natural-born citizen.)

On January 26, 2005, Condoleezza Rice assumed the post of Secretary of State under President George W. Bush, which made her the highest-ranked woman among cabinet secretaries to enter the presidential line of succession, standing fourth. Nancy Pelosi surpassed Rice on January 4, 2007, when her election as the first female speaker of the House put her second in line to the presidency. Kamala Harris replaced Pelosi to become the highest-ranking woman ever to be in the line of succession upon being inaugurated as the first female Vice President on January 20, 2021, alongside President Joe Biden.

President Joe Biden named the most women as secretaries to his first-term Cabinet, with five: former Federal Reserve chair Janet Yellen as Secretary of the Treasury; U.S. representative Deb Haaland (D-NM) as Secretary of the Interior; Rhode Island governor Gina Raimondo as Secretary of Commerce; U.S. representative Marcia Fudge (D-OH) as Secretary of Housing and Urban Development; and Michigan governor Jennifer Granholm as Secretary of Energy, exceeding by one the record set by President Barack Obama. However, including cabinet reshuffles during his second term in office, Obama still holds the record for most women appointed to permanent cabinet positions with eight, the most of any presidency. That record was equaled by President Donald Trump in his second administration.

The Department of Labor has had the most female secretaries, with eight. The Department of Health and Human Services has had five; the Departments of Commerce and Education has had four; the Departments of Homeland Security, Housing and Urban Development, Interior, Justice, State, and Transportation have had three; the Departments of Agriculture and Energy have had two; and the Department of Treasury have had one. The Departments of Defense and Veterans Affairs are the only existing executive departments that do not have female secretaries yet.

The totals for this list include only women presidential appointees confirmed (if necessary) by the U.S. Senate to cabinet or cabinet-level positions and taking their oath of office; they do not include acting officials or nominees awaiting confirmation.

== Permanent cabinet members ==
The following list includes women who have held permanent cabinet positions, all of whom are in the line of succession to the presidency. The table below is organized based on the beginning of their terms in office. Officeholders whose terms begin the same day are listed according to the presidential order of succession.

* denotes the first female holder of that particular office

No.	Name	Office	Succession	Start	End	Party	President(s)	Ref.
1	Frances Perkins*	Secretary of Labor	— (Note: Labor was only included in the presidential line of succession under the Presidential Succession Act of 1947.)	March 4, 1933	June 30, 1945	Democratic	Franklin D. Roosevelt (1933–1945)	
1	Frances Perkins*	Secretary of Labor	—	March 4, 1933	June 30, 1945	Democratic	Harry S. Truman (1945–1953)	
2	Oveta Hobby*	Secretary of Health, Education, and Welfare	12	April 11, 1953	July 31, 1955	Republican	Dwight D. Eisenhower (1953–1961)	
3	Carla Hills*	Secretary of Housing and Urban Development	13	March 10, 1975	January 20, 1977	Republican	Gerald Ford (1974–1977)	
4	Juanita M. Kreps*	Secretary of Commerce	10	January 23, 1977	October 31, 1979	Democratic	Jimmy Carter (1977–1981)	
5/6	Patricia Harris	Secretary of Housing and Urban Development	13	January 23, 1977	September 10, 1979	Democratic	Jimmy Carter (1977–1981)	
5/6	Patricia Harris	Secretary of Health and Human Services	12	August 3, 1979	January 20, 1981	Democratic	Jimmy Carter (1977–1981)	
7	Shirley Hufstedler*	Secretary of Education	16	November 30, 1979	January 20, 1981	Democratic	Jimmy Carter (1977–1981)	
8	Elizabeth Dole*	Secretary of Transportation	14	February 7, 1983	September 30, 1987	Republican	Ronald Reagan (1981–1989)	
9	Margaret Heckler	Secretary of Health and Human Services	12	March 10, 1983	December 13, 1985	Republican	Ronald Reagan (1981–1989)	
10	Ann McLaughlin	Secretary of Labor	11	December 14, 1987	January 20, 1989	Republican	Ronald Reagan (1981–1989)	
11	Elizabeth Dole	Secretary of Labor	11	January 25, 1989	November 23, 1990	Republican	George H. W. Bush (1989–1993)	
12	Lynn Martin	Secretary of Labor	11	February 7, 1991	January 20, 1993	Republican	George H. W. Bush (1989–1993)	
13	Barbara Franklin	Secretary of Commerce	10	February 27, 1992	January 20, 1993	Republican	George H. W. Bush (1989–1993)	
14	Donna Shalala	Secretary of Health and Human Services	12	January 22, 1993	January 20, 2001	Democratic	Bill Clinton (1993–2001)	
15	Hazel R. O'Leary*	Secretary of Energy	15	January 22, 1993	January 20, 1997	Democratic	Bill Clinton (1993–2001)	
16	Janet Reno*	Attorney General	7	March 12, 1993	January 20, 2001	Democratic	Bill Clinton (1993–2001)	
17	Madeleine Albright*	Secretary of State	4	January 23, 1997	January 20, 2001	Democratic	Bill Clinton (1993–2001)	
18	Alexis Herman	Secretary of Labor	11	May 1, 1997	January 20, 2001	Democratic	Bill Clinton (1993–2001)	
19	Ann Veneman*	Secretary of Agriculture	9	January 20, 2001	January 20, 2005	Republican	George W. Bush (2001–2009)	
20	Elaine Chao	Secretary of Labor	11	January 29, 2001	January 20, 2009	Republican	George W. Bush (2001–2009)	
21	Gale Norton*	Secretary of the Interior	8	January 31, 2001	March 31, 2006	Republican	George W. Bush (2001–2009)	
22	Margaret Spellings	Secretary of Education	16	January 20, 2005	January 20, 2009	Republican	George W. Bush (2001–2009)	
23	Condoleezza Rice	Secretary of State	4	January 26, 2005	January 20, 2009	Republican	George W. Bush (2001–2009)	
24	Mary E. Peters	Secretary of Transportation	14	October 17, 2006	January 20, 2009	Republican	George W. Bush (2001–2009)	
25	Hillary Clinton	Secretary of State	4	January 21, 2009	February 1, 2013	Democratic	Barack Obama (2009–2017)	
26	Janet Napolitano*	Secretary of Homeland Security	18	January 21, 2009	September 6, 2013	Democratic	Barack Obama (2009–2017)	
27	Hilda Solis	Secretary of Labor	11	February 24, 2009	January 22, 2013	Democratic	Barack Obama (2009–2017)	
28	Kathleen Sebelius	Secretary of Health and Human Services	12	April 28, 2009	June 9, 2014	Democratic	Barack Obama (2009–2017)	
29	Sally Jewell	Secretary of the Interior	8	April 12, 2013	January 20, 2017	Democratic	Barack Obama (2009–2017)	
30	Penny Pritzker	Secretary of Commerce	10	June 26, 2013	January 20, 2017	Democratic	Barack Obama (2009–2017)	
31	Sylvia Burwell	Secretary of Health and Human Services	12	June 9, 2014	January 20, 2017	Democratic	Barack Obama (2009–2017)	
32	Loretta Lynch	Attorney General	7	April 27, 2015	January 20, 2017	Democratic	Barack Obama (2009–2017)	
33	Elaine Chao	Secretary of Transportation	14	January 31, 2017	January 11, 2021	Republican	Donald Trump (2017–2021)	
34	Betsy DeVos	Secretary of Education	16	February 7, 2017	January 8, 2021	Republican	Donald Trump (2017–2021)	
35	Kirstjen Nielsen	Secretary of Homeland Security	18	December 6, 2017	April 10, 2019	Republican	Donald Trump (2017–2021)	
36	Kamala Harris*	Vice President	1	January 20, 2021	January 20, 2025	Democratic	Joe Biden (2021–2025)	
37	Janet Yellen*	Secretary of the Treasury	5	January 26, 2021	January 20, 2025	Democratic	Joe Biden (2021–2025)	
38	Jennifer Granholm	Secretary of Energy	15	February 25, 2021	January 20, 2025	Democratic	Joe Biden (2021–2025)	
39	Gina Raimondo	Secretary of Commerce	10	March 3, 2021	January 20, 2025	Democratic	Joe Biden (2021–2025)	
40	Marcia Fudge	Secretary of Housing and Urban Development	13	March 10, 2021	March 22, 2024	Democratic	Joe Biden (2021–2025)	
41	Deb Haaland	Secretary of the Interior	8	March 16, 2021	January 20, 2025	Democratic	Joe Biden (2021–2025)	
42	Kristi Noem	Secretary of Homeland Security	18	January 25, 2025	March 24, 2026	Republican	Donald Trump (2025–present)	
43	Pam Bondi	Attorney General	7	February 5, 2025	April 2, 2026	Republican	Donald Trump (2025–present)	
44	Brooke Rollins	Secretary of Agriculture	9	February 13, 2025	Incumbent	Republican	Donald Trump (2025–present)	
45	Linda McMahon	Secretary of Education	16	March 3, 2025	Incumbent	Republican	Donald Trump (2025–present)	
46	Lori Chavez-DeRemer	Secretary of Labor	11	March 11, 2025	April 20, 2026	Republican	Donald Trump (2025–present)	

=== Former permanent cabinet members ===
- The Secretary of War became defunct when the Department of War was split between the Department of the Army and the Department of the Air Force by the National Security Act of 1947, and both were absorbed into the Department of Defense in 1949. No woman had ever served while it was a cabinet post.
- The Postmaster General ceased to be a member of the cabinet when the Post Office Department was re-organized into the United States Postal Service (USPS) by the Postal Reorganization Act of 1970. No woman had ever served while it was a cabinet post. Megan Brennan became the first woman to serve as Postmaster General in 2015. She was appointed after the USPS became an independent agency of the executive branch.
- The Secretary of Commerce and Labor became renamed when the Department of Commerce and Labor was split between the Department of Commerce and the Department of Labor. The Department of Commerce is considered a continuation of the Department of Commerce and Labor under a new name. No woman had ever served under the original title of the position.
- The Secretary of the Army ceased to be a member of the cabinet when the Department of the Army became a component of the Department of Defense in 1949. No woman had ever served while it was a cabinet post. Christine Wormuth became the first woman to serve as Secretary of the Army in 2021. She was appointed after it became a position beneath the Secretary of Defense.
- The Secretary of the Navy ceased to be a member of the cabinet when the Department of the Navy became a component of the Department of Defense in 1949. No woman had ever served while it was a cabinet post. Susan Livingstone became the first woman to serve as acting Secretary of the Navy in 2003. She was appointed after it became a position beneath the Secretary of Defense.
- The Secretary of the Air Force ceased to be a member of the cabinet when the Department of the Air Force became a component of the Department of Defense in 1949. No woman had ever served while it was a cabinet post. Sheila Widnall became the first woman to serve as Secretary of the Air Force in 1993. She was appointed after it became a position beneath the Secretary of Defense.

== Cabinet-level positions ==
The president may designate or remove additional officials as members of the cabinet. These positions have not always been in the cabinet, so some female officeholders may not be listed.

The following list includes women who have held cabinet-level positions, which can vary under each president. They are not in the line of succession and are not necessarily officers of the United States. The table below is organized based on the beginning of their terms in office while it was raised to cabinet-level status. Officeholders whose terms begin the same day are listed alphabetically by last name.

* denotes the first female holder of that particular office

No.	Name	Office	Start	End	Party	President(s)	Ref.
1	Anne L. Armstrong*	Counselor to the President	January 19, 1973	December 18, 1974	Republican	Richard Nixon (1969–1974)	
1	Anne L. Armstrong*	Counselor to the President	January 19, 1973	December 18, 1974	Republican	Gerald Ford (1974–1977)	
2	Jeane Kirkpatrick*	United States Ambassador to the United Nations	February 4, 1981	April 1, 1985	Republican	Ronald Reagan (1981–1989)	
3	Carla Hills*	United States Trade Representative	February 6, 1989	January 20, 1993	Republican	George H. W. Bush (1989–1993)	
4	Carol Browner	Administrator of the Environmental Protection Agency	January 23, 1993	January 20, 2001	Democratic	Bill Clinton (1993–2001)	
5	Madeleine Albright	United States Ambassador to the United Nations	January 27, 1993	January 21, 1997	Democratic	Bill Clinton (1993–2001)	
6	Laura Tyson*	Chair of the Council of Economic Advisers	February 5, 1993	February 21, 1995	Democratic	Bill Clinton (1993–2001)	
7	Alice Rivlin*	Director of the Office of Management and Budget	October 17, 1994	April 26, 1996	Democratic	Bill Clinton (1993–2001)	
8	Janet Yellen	Chair of the Council of Economic Advisers	February 18, 1997	August 3, 1999	Democratic	Bill Clinton (1993–2001)	
9	Aida Álvarez	Administrator of the Small Business Administration	March 7, 1997	January 19, 2001	Democratic	Bill Clinton (1993–2001)	
10	Charlene Barshefsky	United States Trade Representative	March 18, 1997	January 20, 2001	Democratic	Bill Clinton (1993–2001)	
11	Christine Whitman	Administrator of the Environmental Protection Agency	January 31, 2001	June 27, 2003	Republican	George W. Bush (2001–2009)	
12	Susan Schwab	United States Trade Representative	June 8, 2006	January 20, 2009	Republican	George W. Bush (2001–2009)	
13	Lisa P. Jackson	Administrator of the Environmental Protection Agency	January 23, 2009	February 19, 2013	Democratic	Barack Obama (2009–2017)	
14	Susan Rice	United States Ambassador to the United Nations	January 26, 2009	June 30, 2013	Democratic	Barack Obama (2009–2017)	
15	Christina Romer	Chair of the Council of Economic Advisers	January 28, 2009	September 3, 2010	Democratic	Barack Obama (2009–2017)	
16	Karen Mills	Administrator of the Small Business Administration	January 13, 2012 (Note: The start date given here is the day when a position was elevated to cabinet-level status, not an officeholder appointed.)	September 1, 2013	Democratic	Barack Obama (2009–2017)	
17	Sylvia Burwell	Director of the Office of Management and Budget	April 24, 2013	June 9, 2014	Democratic	Barack Obama (2009–2017)	
18	Gina McCarthy	Administrator of the Environmental Protection Agency	July 18, 2013	January 20, 2017	Democratic	Barack Obama (2009–2017)	
19	Samantha Power	United States Ambassador to the United Nations	August 5, 2013	January 20, 2017	Democratic	Barack Obama (2009–2017)	
20	Maria Contreras-Sweet	Administrator of the Small Business Administration	April 7, 2014	January 20, 2017	Democratic	Barack Obama (2009–2017)	
21	Nikki Haley	United States Ambassador to the United Nations	January 25, 2017	December 31, 2018	Republican	Donald Trump (2017–2021)	
22	Linda McMahon	Administrator of the Small Business Administration	February 14, 2017	April 12, 2019	Republican	Donald Trump (2017–2021)	
23	Gina Haspel*	Director of the Central Intelligence Agency	May 21, 2018	January 20, 2021	Republican	Donald Trump (2017–2021)	
24	Jovita Carranza	Administrator of the Small Business Administration	January 14, 2020	January 20, 2021	Republican	Donald Trump (2017–2021)	
25	Avril Haines*	Director of National Intelligence	January 21, 2021	January 20, 2025	Democratic	Joe Biden (2021–2025)	
26	Linda Thomas-Greenfield	United States Ambassador to the United Nations	February 25, 2021	January 20, 2025	Democratic	Joe Biden (2021–2025)	
27	Cecilia Rouse	Chair of the Council of Economic Advisers	March 12, 2021	March 31, 2023	Democratic	Joe Biden (2021–2025)	
28	Isabel Guzman	Administrator of the Small Business Administration	March 17, 2021	January 20, 2025	Democratic	Joe Biden (2021–2025)	
29	Katherine Tai	United States Trade Representative	March 18, 2021	January 20, 2025	Democratic	Joe Biden (2021–2025)	
30	Shalanda Young	Director of the Office of Management and Budget	March 17, 2022	January 20, 2025	Democratic	Joe Biden (2021–2025)	
31	Arati Prabhakar*	Director of the Office of Science and Technology Policy	October 3, 2022	January 20, 2025	Democratic	Joe Biden (2021–2025)	
32	Susie Wiles*	White House Chief of Staff	January 20, 2025	November 6, 2026	Republican	Donald Trump (2025–present)	
33	Tulsi Gabbard	Director of National Intelligence	February 12, 2025	June 19, 2026	Republican	Donald Trump (2025–present)	
34	Kelly Loeffler	Administrator of the Small Business Administration	February 20, 2025	Incumbent	Republican	Donald Trump (2025–present)	

== See also ==
Other lists of United States Cabinet members

- List of African-American United States Cabinet members
- List of foreign-born United States Cabinet members
- List of Hispanic and Latino American United States Cabinet members
- List of Jewish United States Cabinet members

Lists of international female executive department leaders

- List of female defence ministers
- List of female finance ministers
- List of female foreign ministers
- List of female interior ministers
- List of female justice ministers
