= Patricia Roberts Harris =

American politician and diplomat

Patricia Harris
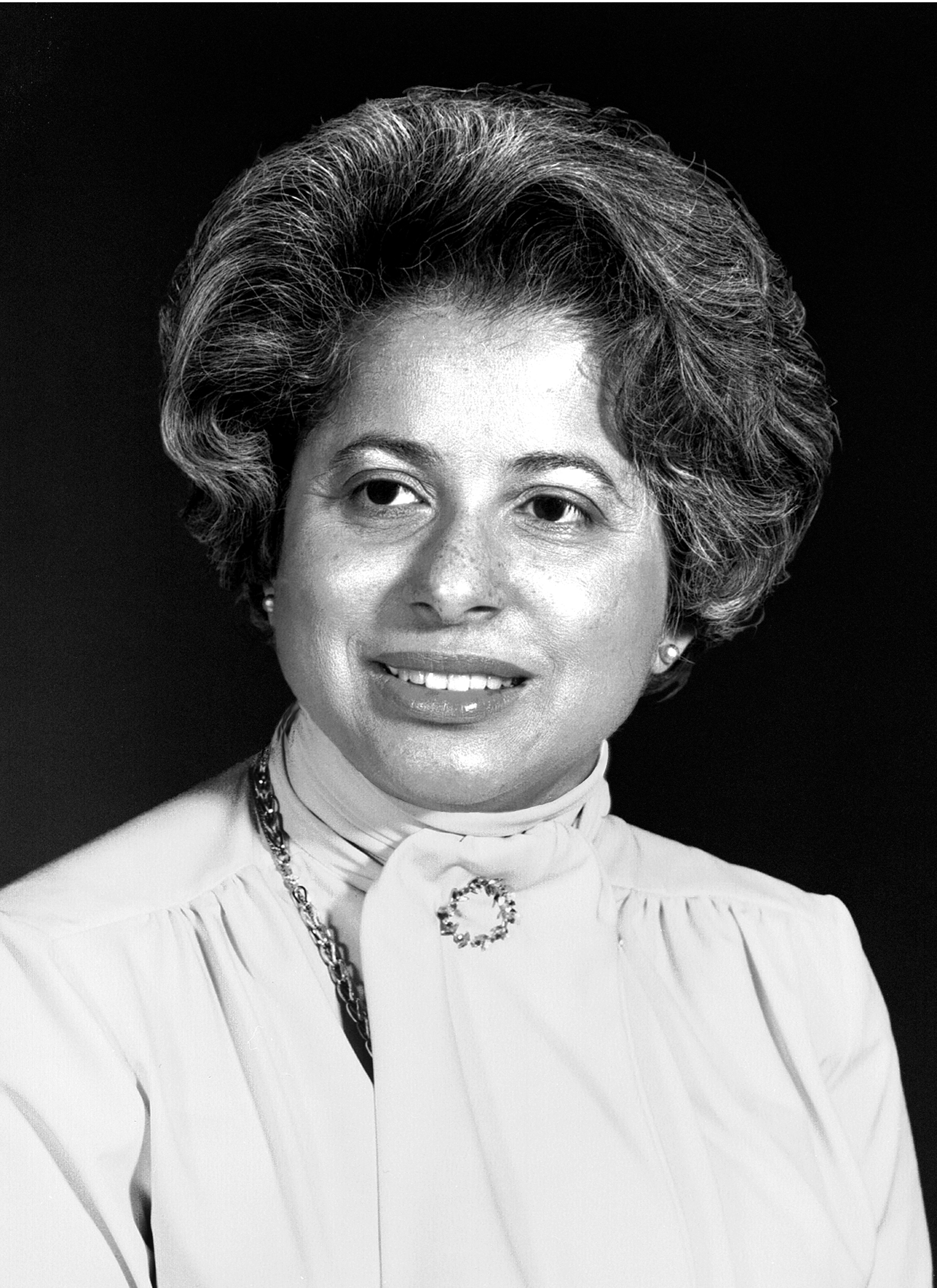

13th United States Secretary of Health and Human Services (Note: Harris was Secretary on May 4, 1980, when the office changed names from Secretary of Health, Education, and Welfare to Secretary of Health and Human Services. Because the department merely changed names, she did not need to be confirmed again, and her term continued uninterrupted)
- In office August 3, 1979 – January 20, 1981
- President: Jimmy Carter
- Preceded by: Joseph A. Califano Jr. (Health, Education, and Welfare)
- Succeeded by: Richard Schweiker (Health and Human Services); Shirley Hufstedler (Education)

6th United States Secretary of Housing and Urban Development
- In office January 23, 1977 – September 10, 1979
- President: Jimmy Carter
- Preceded by: Carla Anderson Hills
- Succeeded by: Moon Landrieu

United States Ambassador to Luxembourg
- In office September 7, 1965 – September 22, 1967
- President: Lyndon B. Johnson
- Preceded by: William R. Rivkin
- Succeeded by: George J. Feldman

Personal details
- Born: Patricia Roberts; May 31, 1924 Mattoon, Illinois, U.S.
- Died: March 23, 1985 (aged 60) Washington, D.C., U.S.
- Resting place: Rock Creek Cemetery
- Party: Democratic
- Spouse: William Harris (m. 1955; died 1984)
- Education: Howard University (BA); University of Chicago (attended); American University (MS); George Washington University (JD)

Patricia Roberts Harris (May 31, 1924 – March 23, 1985) was an American politician, diplomat, and legal scholar. She served as the 6th United States secretary of housing and urban development from 1977 to 1979 and as the 13th United States secretary of health and human services from 1979 to 1981 under President Jimmy Carter.

Born and raised in Illinois, She previously served as the United States ambassador to Luxembourg from 1965 to 1967 under President Lyndon B. Johnson. Throughout her public career, Harris was a trailblazer for women and people of color to hold a number of positions, including the first African American woman and woman of color ever to serve in a presidential cabinet and the first woman and person of color appointed to two different presidential cabinet positions. She was the first African American HHS secretary and just the second black HUD secretary, as well as the second woman to lead either of those executive departments. Furthermore, she was the first black woman U.S. ambassador, the dean of a U.S. law school, and a member of a Fortune 500 company's board of directors. A member of the Democratic Party, she ran for mayor of the District of Columbia in the 1982 mayoral election but was defeated during the primaries, ultimately finishing second to incumbent mayor Marion Barry.

== Early life ==
Patricia Roberts was born on May 31, 1924, in Mattoon, Illinois, the daughter of railroad dining car waiter Bert Fitzgerald Roberts and Hildren Brodie (née Johnson). She had one younger brother, Malcolm, known to his family as Mickey. Her parents separated when she was 6 years old, after which she was raised primarily by her mother and grandmother, attending public school in Chicago.

== Education ==
After earning scholarships to five different colleges, Roberts selected Howard University, from which she graduated, summa cum laude, in 1945. While at Howard, she was elected Phi Beta Kappa and served as Vice Chairman of the Howard University chapter of the NAACP. During her time at Howard University, she was also a member of Delta Sigma Theta — a historically Black sorority that had been founded at Patricia's alma mater in 1913. In 1943, she participated in one of the nation's first lunch counter sit-ins. She did graduate work in industrial relations at the University of Chicago from 1946 to 1949. In order to be better involved in civil rights work, she transferred to American University in 1949, where she would ultimately receive her master's degree.

After marrying in 1955, Harris was beginning to pursue a career in education, but saw limited opportunity because of segregation. Her husband encouraged her to go to law school, and she received her J.D. from the George Washington University National Law Center in 1960, ranking number one out of a class of ninety-four students. She passed the bar exam the same year.

In 1965, Harris was honored in absentia with the Alumni Achievement Award of George Washington University Law School.

== Career ==
While studying in Chicago, Roberts was a program director for the Young Women's Christian Association. While at American University, she concurrently worked as the assistant director of the American Council on Human Rights, beginning in 1949 and staying until 1953. Her first position with the U.S. government was in 1960 as an attorney in the appeals and research section of the criminal division of the U.S. Department of Justice. There she met and struck up a friendship with Robert F. Kennedy, the new attorney general.

One year later, Harris took a job as a lecturer and the Associate Dean of Students at Howard University. In 1963, she ceased her role as Dean, but stayed on as a lecturer. Concurrently, from 1962–65, she worked with the National Capital Area Civil Liberties Union. As her skills as an organizer bloomed, Harris also became increasingly involved in the Democratic Party. In 1963, she was elevated to a full professorship at Howard, and President John F. Kennedy appointed her co-chairman of the National Women's Committee for Civil Rights, described as an "umbrella organization encompassing some 100 women's groups throughout the nation." Her co-chair was Mildred McAfee Horton.

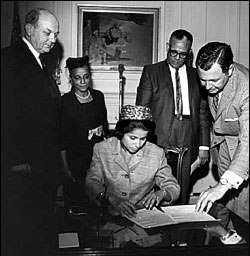
Patricia Harris in 1965, at her swearing-in ceremony to be the U.S. Ambassador to Luxembourg

In 1964, Harris was elected a delegate to the Democratic National Convention from the District of Columbia. She worked in Lyndon Johnson's presidential campaign and seconded his nomination at the 1964 Democratic Convention. In October 1965, President Johnson appointed her Ambassador to Luxembourg, a role she served in until the end of the Johnson administration. She was the first African American woman named as an American envoy. She said of her appointment, "I feel deeply proud and grateful this President chose me to knock down this barrier, but also a little sad about being the 'first Negro woman,' because it implies we were not considered before." Additionally, Johnson named her as alternate delegate to the United Nations General Assembly for the years 1966-68.

In 1967, Harris returned to the faculty of Howard University's School of Law, where she was named Dean in 1969, another first for a Black woman. She resigned as Dean a month later when Howard University President James E. Cheek refused to support her strong stand against student protests. She then joined Fried, Frank, Harris, Shriver & Jacobson, one of Washington, D.C.'s most prestigious law firms.

In 1971, Harris was named to the board of directors of IBM, becoming the first Black American woman to sit on a Fortune 500 company's board of directors. In addition, she served on the boards of Scott Paper, the National Bank of Washington, and Chase Manhattan Bank. Upon her appointment to the Chase Manhattan board, she observed: "The demands on the small pool of Blacks allowed to develop in the last 300 years is too great. What has to happen is that this pool must be increased, and that's something that big corporations can help to do. I'm a first on many boards, but I'm not going to be content to remain the only Black, or the only woman."

Harris continued making an impact on the Democratic Party when, in 1972, she was appointed chairman of the credentials committee and, in 1973, a member-at-large of the Democratic National Committee. President Jimmy Carter appointed her to two cabinet-level posts during his administration.

=== Cabinet Secretary ===
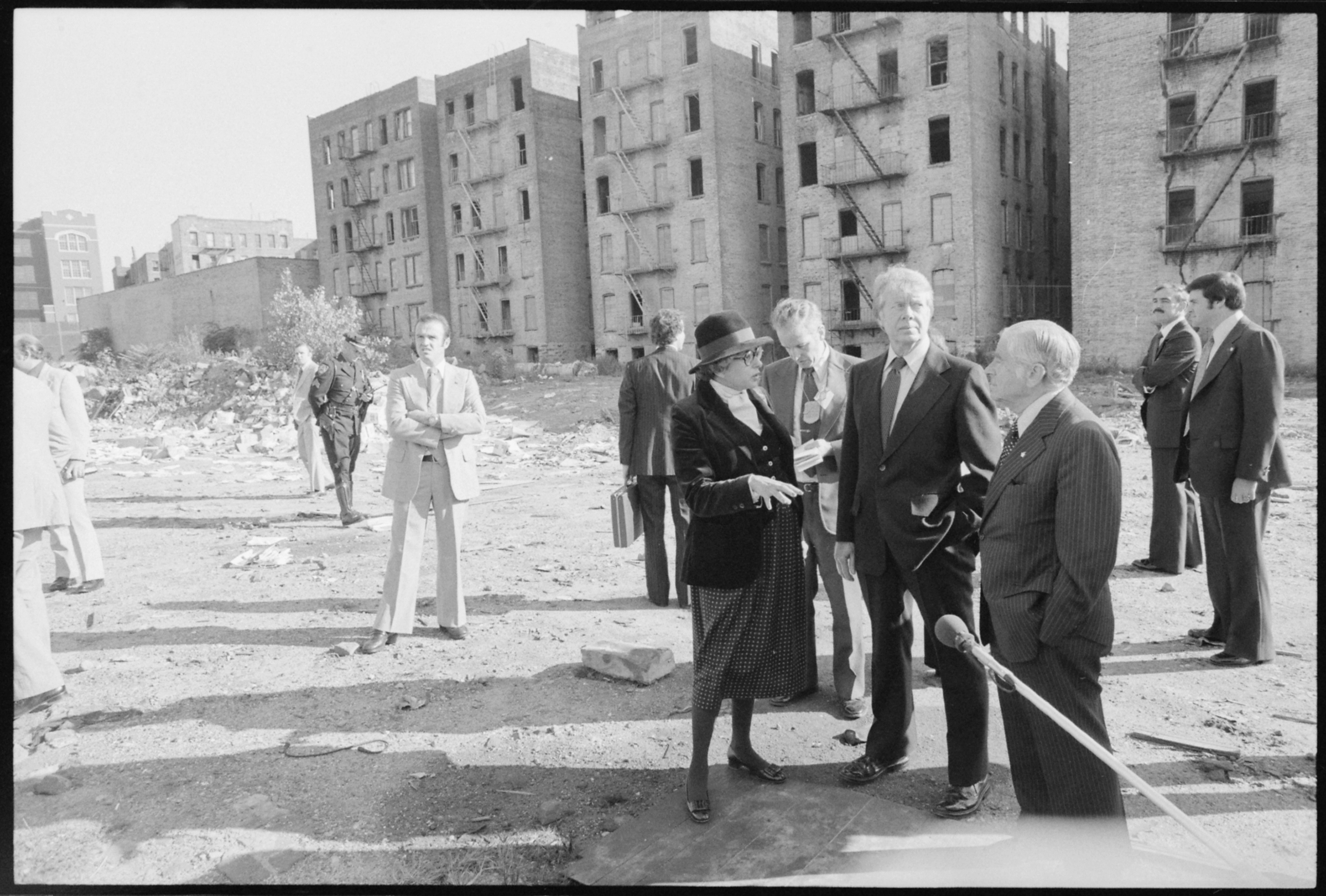
Harris as secretary of HUD with President Carter and New York mayor Abraham Beame touring the South Bronx in 1977

Harris was appointed to the cabinet of President Jimmy Carter as Secretary of Housing and Urban Development (HUD) when Carter took office in 1977. At her confirmation hearing, Senator William Proxmire questioned whether Harris came from a background of too much wealth and power to be an effective HUD Secretary. She responded, "I am a Black woman, the daughter of a Pullman (railroad) car waiter. I am a Black woman who even eight years ago could not buy a house in parts of the District of Columbia. I didn't start out as a member of a prestigious law firm, but as a woman who needed a scholarship to go to school. If you think I have forgotten that, you are wrong." Otherwise, her confirmation went smoothly. By this time in Harris' life, she had established herself as not only a recognized leader for civil rights, but also as a prominent corporate lawyer and businesswoman. Once confirmed, Harris became the first African American woman to enter the Presidential line of succession. She served as HUD Secretary from 1977 to 1979, reorganizing the department and shifting from knocking down slums to rehabilitating the neighborhoods through millions of dollars of funding and her Neighborhood Strategy Program for rebuilding, Urban Development Action Grants for luring businesses back into cities, and an expanded Urban Homesteading Plan. The Washington Post, looking back at her reforms several years later, noted: "[A]fter two years as secretary, the agency had changed from a mere extension of the nation's housing industry to an advocate for saving inner cities."

As a result of her success leading HUD, Carter appointed Harris as the Secretary of Health, Education, and Welfare, the largest Cabinet agency, in 1979. Once again, the confirmation process was easy. After the Department of Education Organization Act came into force on May 4, 1980, the department's education functions were transferred to the Department of Education. Harris remained as Secretary of the renamed Department of Health and Human Services until Carter left office in 1981. Because the department had merely changed names, as opposed to disbanding with a new department being created, she did not face Senate confirmation again after the change. During her tenure with the department, Harris faced several budget crises and refreshed the management team.

Harris offered a number of critiques of her own work in these cabinet positions, including that enforcement of civil rights fell off while she was head of HHS, that Congress called her responses to requests for policy changes that would lower health care costs sluggish, and that many of her programs ended up doing little for her hometown of Washington, D.C.

On the other hand, Office of Management and Budget Associate Director Dennis Green described her approach as "tough-minded, intelligent, quick to grasp the intricacies of her agency, and she went after what she wanted."

=== Post-government ===
In 1981, Harris was appointed a full-time professor at the George Washington University Law School. She remained on the faculty until her death in 1985.

Harris ran unsuccessfully for Mayor of Washington, D.C., in 1982, losing the September 14 primary election to incumbent mayor Marion Barry. Among several factors leading to the loss, including her brusque, no-nonsense means of communication, some scholars have listed that Washington, D.C., had never elected a female mayor. However, the city's first female mayor, Sharon Pratt (1991–95), cut her teeth as Harris' campaign manager for her mayoral race.

== Personal life and death ==
During her tenure at the American Council on Human Rights, Harris first met William Beasley Harris, then a member of the Howard law faculty and later a Federal Power Commission administrative judge. They began dating in 1955, and were married on September 1, 1955.

Harris was a member of Delta Sigma Theta sorority and served for six years as its first national executive director.

In 1967, Lord Snowdon photographed Harris at the United Nations for Vogue. In her spare time, Harris enjoyed cooking and baking.

Harris's husband died in November 1984. She died of breast cancer at age 60 on March 23, 1985. She was interred at the Rock Creek Cemetery in Washington, D.C.

== Legacy ==
Upon her death, Harris endowed the Patricia Roberts Harris Public Affairs Fellowship to enable Howard University students to undertake domestic and international public affairs internships. Established in 1987, the program provides a stipend for a summer internship, along with mentoring, academic, and service learning opportunities; it has so far served over 200 Fellows.

On January 27, 2000, the United States Postal Service's released its 23rd commemorative stamp in its Black Heritage Series, honoring Harris. The stamp was designed by Richard Sheaff of Scottsdale, Arizona, and 150 million copies were produced in recognition of Black History Month. Additionally, in 2003, Harris was inducted into the National Women's Hall of Fame.

== See also ==
- List of African-American firsts
- List of African-American United States Cabinet members
- List of female United States Cabinet members
- List of people who have held multiple United States Cabinet-level positions

== Notes ==
Diplomatic posts
Preceded by William Rivkin	United States Ambassador to Luxembourg; 1965–1967	Succeeded by George Feldman
Political offices
Preceded by Carla Hills	United States Secretary of Housing and Urban Development; 1977–1979	Succeeded by Moon Landrieu
Preceded by Joseph Califano	United States Secretary of Health, Education, and Welfare; 1979–1980	Succeeded by Herself as United States Secretary of Health and Human Services
Preceded by Joseph Califano	United States Secretary of Health, Education, and Welfare; 1979–1980	Succeeded by Shirley Hufstedler as United States Secretary of Education
Preceded by Herself as United States Secretary of Health and Human Services	United States Secretary of Health and Human Services; 1980–1981	Succeeded by Richard Schweiker
