= W. Michael Blumenthal =

German-American businessman and politician (born 1926)

Michael Blumenthal
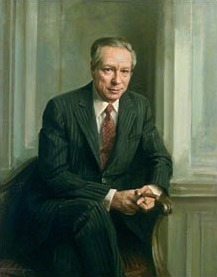
- Portrait, 1970

64th United States Secretary of the Treasury
- In office January 23, 1977 – August 4, 1979
- President: Jimmy Carter
- Preceded by: William E. Simon
- Succeeded by: G. William Miller

Personal details
- Born: Werner Michael Blumenthal; January 3, 1926 (age 100) Oranienburg, Germany
- Party: Democratic
- Spouse(s): Margaret Polley (m. 1951; div. 1982) Barbara Bennett (m. 1983)
- Education: City College of San Francisco (attended); University of California, Berkeley (BS); Princeton University (MA, MPA, PhD)

Werner Michael Blumenthal (born January 3, 1926) is a German-American business leader, economist and political adviser who served as United States Secretary of the Treasury under President Jimmy Carter from 1977 to 1979.

At age thirteen, Blumenthal barely escaped Nazi Germany with his Jewish family in 1939. He was forced to spend World War II living in the ghetto of Japanese-occupied Shanghai, China, until 1947. He then made his way to San Francisco and began doing odd jobs to work his way through school. He enrolled in college, eventually graduating from University of California, Berkeley and Princeton University with degrees in international economics. During his career, he became active in both business and public service.

Before being appointed to a cabinet position with newly elected President Jimmy Carter, Blumenthal had become a successful business leader and had already held senior positions in the administrations of Presidents John F. Kennedy and Lyndon B. Johnson. As a member of the Carter administration, he helped guide economic policy and took part in re-establishing ties with China. After he resigned, he became chairman and CEO of Burroughs Corporation and Unisys, followed by seventeen years as director of the restored Jewish Museum Berlin. He is the author of The Invisible Wall (1998, Counterpoint Press), From Exile to Washington: A Memoir of Leadership in the Twentieth Century (2013, The Overlook Press) and The Payday Conspiracy: A Berlin Noir (2024, Solanum Press). Blumenthal is the oldest living former U.S. Cabinet member and the oldest ever.

== Early life and education ==
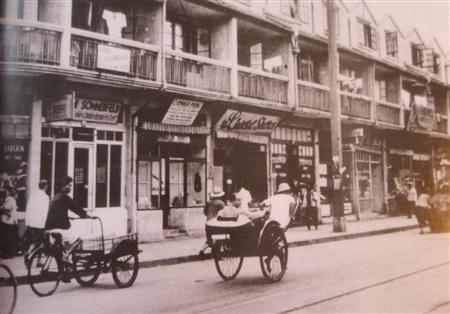
The Shanghai ghetto in 1943

Blumenthal was born in Oranienburg, Weimar Republic (present-day Germany), the son of Rose Valerie (née Markt) and Ewald Blumenthal, both of German-Jewish origins. His family was of well-to-do means as owners of a dress shop. His forebears had lived in Oranienburg since the 16th century. As a result of the Nazi party's Nuremberg Laws, which took effect in 1935, his family began to fear for their lives and realized they had to escape from Germany. Blumenthal recalled Kristallnacht, a series of coordinated attacks against Jews and their property which began throughout Germany on November 9, 1938, when he was 12 years old:

I clearly remember ... when they came and smashed all the Jewish stores. I remember seeing the largest synagogue in Berlin burn, and I remember being beaten up by kids in uniform.

Nazi Gestapo men forced their way into his home early one morning in 1938 and arrested his father for no stated reason. His father was taken to Buchenwald concentration camp, one of the largest forced labor camps in Germany, where an estimated 56,000 people, mostly Jews, were eventually killed. His mother hastily sold all their household possessions and managed to win her husband's release. They had no choice but to sell their long-established dress store to their managing saleswoman for "practically nothing," says his older sister Stefanie. She recalls, "My mother wept—not so much out of the loss, but out of a sense of the unfairness of it, that someone we'd trained could turn on us, could get something we had worked so hard for, for nothing."

With their little remaining money, his mother bought tickets for them to go to Shanghai, China, an open port city which didn't require a visa. They fled Germany on a passenger-carrying freighter shortly before war broke out in 1939. They took only minimal possessions; they were not allowed to take any money. He remembers the voyage: "From Naples via Port Said, Suez, Aden, Bombay, Colombo, Singapore, and Hong Kong; each one of those ports of call was part of the British Empire, and none would admit Jewish refugees."

Upon arriving, they expected to remain only briefly, assuming they could then travel on to a safer country. However, with the outbreak of World War II, Japan had occupied Shanghai, and the Blumenthals were forced to live in the Shanghai French Concession and then, from 1943-47, in the Shanghai Ghetto.

The tough refugee war years were precious lessons for the future ... In Shanghai I learned what it means to be hungry, poor, and forgotten for no fault of one's own, and what people will do when their backs are up against the wall. I saw that life can be unfair, that titles, possessions, and all the trappings of position and status are transitory, that they are not as important as one's own inner resources in the face of hard times, personal setbacks and defeats.

— Michael Blumenthal

Blumenthal witnessed severe poverty and starvation throughout the ghetto, sometimes seeing corpses lying in the streets. "It was a cesspool," he said. He was able to find a cleaning job at a chemical factory and earned $1 a week, which was used to feed his family:

I was confined to a faraway corner of Asia, so destitute that newspapers were stuffed into my shoes to cover up the holes ... I had no passport at all [and] for two and a half years I was a prisoner of the Japanese, and later not even the most junior American consular official would have given me the time of day.

His schooling was haphazard, and the stress of survival caused his parents to divorce. Nevertheless, he was able to learn English during a brief period attending a British school, and learned to speak some Chinese, French and Portuguese during other periods there.

When the war in the Pacific ended in the summer of 1945, American troops entered Shanghai. He found a job as a warehouse helper with the U.S. Air Force, which benefited from his linguistic skills. By 1947 he and his sister, after much effort and being refused visas to Canada, received visas to the U.S.

They made their way to San Francisco, where they knew no one, and with only $200 between them. With limited education, and now a stateless refugee, he did his best to make something of himself:

I came to this country feeling that I had capabilities and talents. I read a lot. I talked to people. I wanted to do things. I found out that I can cope reasonably well.

== Education ==
Blumenthal found his first full-time job earning $40 per week as a billing clerk for the National Biscuit Company. He later enrolled at San Francisco City College and supported himself doing part-time work, including truck driver, night elevator operator, busboy and movie theater ticket-taker. He also worked as an armored guard and at a wax factory, where he filled "little paper cups with wax" from midnight until 8 a.m.

Blumenthal was admitted to the University of California, Berkeley where he graduated Phi Beta Kappa in 1951 with a B.S. degree in international economics. It was also where he met and married Margaret Eileen Polley in 1951. In 1952 Blumenthal became a naturalized U.S. citizen.

Blumenthal was offered a scholarship to attend the Woodrow Wilson School of Public and International Affairs at Princeton University, in New Jersey. From there, he earned a Master of Arts and Master of Public Affairs in 1953, followed by a Ph.D. in economics in 1956. Blumenthal's doctoral dissertation was titled "Labor-management relations in the German steel industry, 1947-54." For income, his wife worked as a secretary and he taught economics at Princeton from 1954 to 1957. He also worked as a labor arbitrator for the state of New Jersey from 1955 to 1957.

== Career ==
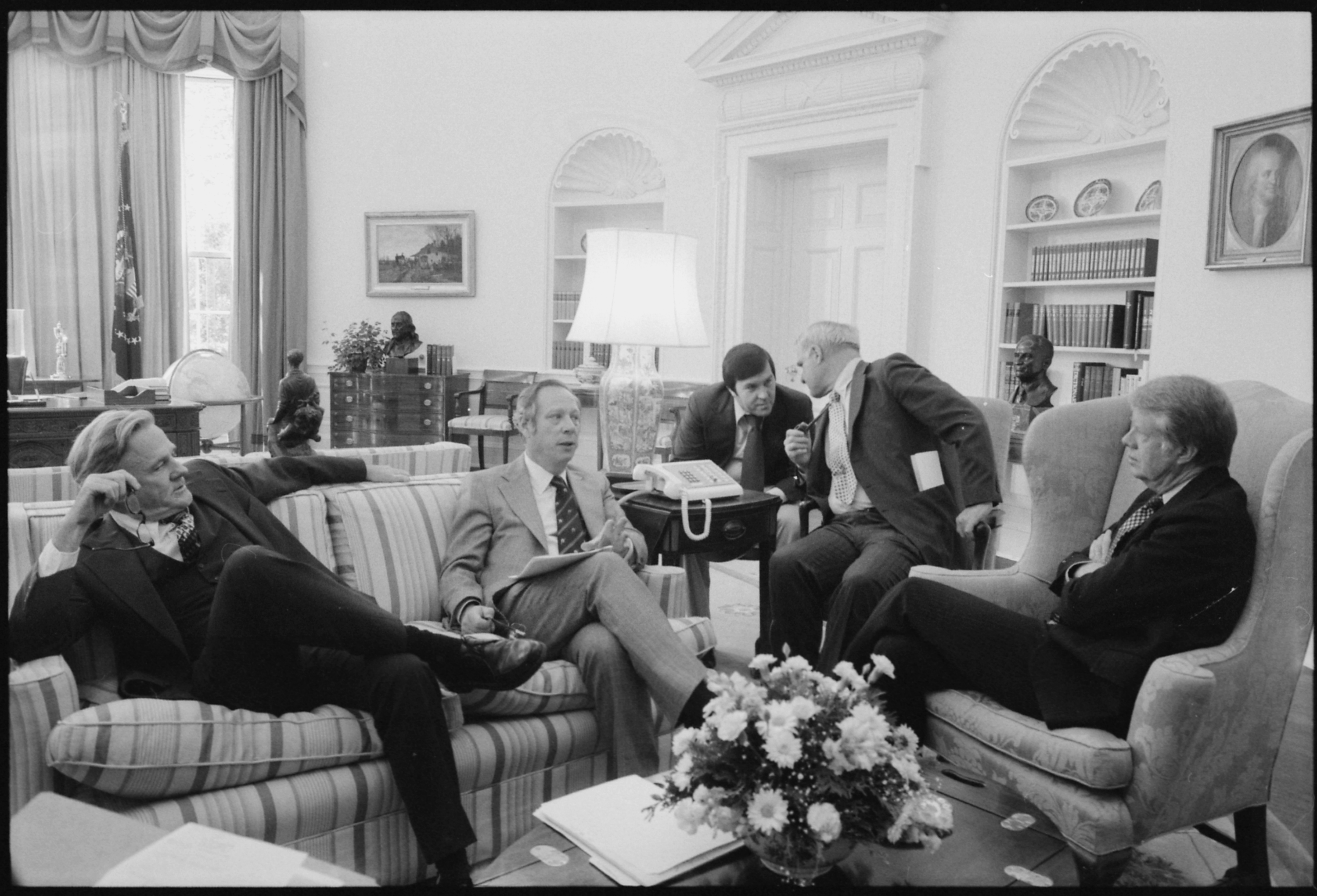
From right to left: President Jimmy Carter, James Schlesinger, Hamilton Jordan, Blumenthal, and Charles Schultze in the Oval Office in 1978

Blumenthal left Princeton University to join Crown Cork, a manufacturer of bottle caps, in 1957, where he remained until 1961 and rose to become its vice president and director.

In 1961, having by then been a registered Democrat, he moved to Washington, D.C., following John F. Kennedy's inauguration, where he was offered a position by diplomat, George Ball, to serve as Kennedy's deputy Assistant Secretary of State for Economic and Business Affairs. He accepted the position and served in the State Department from 1961 until 1967 as an adviser on trade to Kennedy and, after Kennedy's assassination, as an adviser to Lyndon B. Johnson.

Johnson made him U.S. Ambassador and chief U. S. negotiator at the Kennedy Round General Agreement on Tariffs and Trade talks in Geneva, considered to be one of the world's most significant multilateral trade negotiation. Canada's Minister of Trade and Commerce described Blumenthal as a tough negotiator, which Blumenthal feels is ironic: "If they'd let me into the country in 1945, I might have been working on their side."

In 1967, Blumenthal left government to join Bendix Corporation, a manufacturing and engineering company specializing in auto parts, electronics and aerospace. After five years he was appointed as its chairman and CEO, and remained with the company for ten more years. When he first took over Bendix, the company was regarded by Wall Street as a faltering company. After five years as its chairman, the company nearly doubled its sales to just under $3 billion, and by 1976 Duns Review rated Bendix as "one of the five best-managed companies in the U.S."

While Blumenthal headed Bendix, newly elected President Carter nominated him to become his U.S. Secretary of the Treasury, a position in which he served from January 23, 1977, to August 4, 1979. Cyrus Vance had originally wanted him to be his deputy when he became Carter's Secretary of State, but Carter decided he would be better placed as Secretary of the Treasury. His nomination was unanimously confirmed. That June, he traveled to the Organisation for Economic Co-operation and Development's (OECD) Paris headquarters for its annual conference, with its main agenda concerned with how Western powers would manage the sluggish recovery after the deep recession of 1974–75.

Blumenthal first met Carter in 1975 at a meeting of the Trilateral Commission in Japan. Carter subsequently invited him to his home knowing his talents as a successful business manager and negotiator, and knew Blumenthal would offer him sound economic advice. Blumenthal recalls at the time, "The list of top Democratic businessmen isn't very long." In accepting the position, his income went from $473,000 per year to $66,000. He was also amused at the irony of reading a German newspaper headline, "A Berliner is to Become Carter's New Minister of Finance."

As Secretary of the Treasury, however, he was never made a member of Carter's "inner circle," and his responsibilities were never clearly defined, writes historian Burton Ira Kaufman. Although he was made chair of Carter's Economic Policy Group (EPG), and was Carter's chief economic policy official, he was still unable to chart economic policy or be recognized as the administration's chief economic spokesman. He instead had to share the role with those closer to the president, which caused confusion among outsiders and weakened Blumenthal's effectiveness.

Blumenthal took an active role in fighting inflation, which had increased from 7 percent at the beginning of 1978 to 11 percent by the fall. By the summer of 1979 inflation had reached 14 percent, with unemployment in some cities running close to 25 percent. Much of the increase had to do with OPEC raising oil prices. During this period, the U.S. dollar was also a target of one of the largest currency speculations in history by countries including Germany and Japan, whose currencies were rapidly appreciating against the dollar.

In February 1979, Blumenthal represented the U.S. in its first visit to China by an American Cabinet officer following America's official recognition of their Communist government, which China had proclaimed in 1949. Until that time, most American China scholars had never been to China, and the event was so newsworthy that twenty journalists traveled with Blumenthal and his staff. His experience living in Shanghai is considered to have been an important factor in Chinese leaders inviting him, instead of a State Department official. His trip was a great success, notes biographer Bernard Katz. Blumenthal also went back the following month for the opening of the U.S. Embassy. He explains:

Our visit was an opening move in the slow, carefully managed, renewed coming together of China and the United States, haltingly begun with many fits and starts in the early seventies, and culminating nine years later with the reestablishment of full diplomatic relations (in which I would be destined to play an official role.)

He used part of his speech, much of which he gave speaking in Chinese, to convey to Chinese leaders America's serious concern with China's invasion of Vietnam a week earlier. Henry Kissinger described the multipronged invasion which may have included up to 400,000 Chinese soldiers. Blumenthal asked them to withdraw their troops "as quickly as possible," since it carried the "risk of wider wars." The Chinese were particularly impressed by Blumenthal's speech, adds Katz. And although the effect of his speech is not known, the Chinese army did withdraw a few weeks after his visit.

In July 1979, Carter outlined his measures for dealing with the nation's economic and energy crisis, and at the same time asked five members of his cabinet, including Blumenthal, to resign. Twenty-three other senior staff members were also let go.

After resigning he joined Burroughs Corporation in 1980 as vice chairman, then chairman of the board a year later. After merging the company with Sperry Corporation, it became Unisys Corporation in 1986, with Blumenthal its chairman and chief executive officer (CEO). He remained with Unisys until 1990 when he stepped down after several years of losses to become a limited partner at Lazard Freres & Company, an investment bank located in New York. Having more free time, he taught economics courses at Princeton.

In April 2016, he was one of eight former Treasury secretaries who called on the United Kingdom to remain a member of the European Union ahead of the June 2016 Referendum.

== Jewish Museum of Berlin ==
In 1997, Blumenthal became the founding director of the Jewish Museum Berlin in Germany's then-new capital of the Federal Republic. His work began in December of that year, when he accepted an invitation from the city of Berlin to become president and chief executive of the Berlin Jewish Museum. The first Jewish Museum in Berlin was founded in 1933, but was closed in 1938 by the Nazi regime. The re-imagined museum includes displays documenting 2,000 years of the often-tragic chapters in German-Jewish history, including the Holocaust, and is the largest Jewish museum in Europe. Blumenthal remained the museum's director from 1997 until 2014, with the completion and opening of the Museum in 2001 being credited to his direction. The project has attracted considerable attention within and outside of Germany. In 1999 and 2006, Blumenthal was awarded Germany's Senior Medals of Merit for his services to the Federal Republic of Germany, in recognition of his work in Berlin.

== Personal life ==
He married Margaret Eileen Polley, a child development specialist, in 1951, while attending college; they had three daughters: Ann, Jill, and Jane. They separated in 1977 and divorced in 1982.

Currently he resides in Princeton, New Jersey with his second wife Barbara (née Bennett), with whom he has one son, Michael.

In 2008, he was elected as a delegate to the Democratic National Convention, and pledged to back then-Senator Barack Obama.

Blumenthal is featured in the 2020 documentary Harbor from the Holocaust.

On January 3, 2026, Blumenthal turned 100.

== Awards and honors ==
- Blumenthal was the recipient of Princeton University's Madison Medal for Outstanding Public Service in 1979.
- In 1980, he received the Horatio Alger Award from the Horatio Alger Association of Distinguished Americans.
- In 1999, he received the Leo Baeck Medal for his humanitarian work promoting tolerance and social justice, as well as the Grand Cross of Merit of the Federal Republic of Germany.
- In 2002, he received the Goethe Medal, Culture Prize of Berlin, and Berlin's Medal of Merit.
- In 2013 Blumenthal received the Lucius D. Clay Medal, and Roland Berger Prize for Human Dignity.
- In 2014 he received the Nachama Prize for Tolerance and Civil Courage, and in 2015, received the Jewish Museum Berlin's Prize for Tolerance and Understanding.
- He was elected an honorary citizen of Berlin in 2015, as well as of Oranienburg, the city of his birth.
- In 2025 he was co-winner, along with Elena Bashkirova, of the Felix Mendelssohn Bartholdy Prize
- He was the recipient of The International Center in New York's Award of Excellence.
- Blumenthal holds numerous honorary degrees from major U.S. universities.

== See also ==
- List of foreign-born United States Cabinet members
- List of Jewish United States Cabinet members

Political offices
Preceded by William E. Simon	United States Secretary of the Treasury; 1977–1979	Succeeded by William Miller
U.S. order of precedence (ceremonial)
Preceded by John Albert Knebel as Former U.S. Cabinet Member	Order of precedence of the United States as Former U.S. Cabinet Member	Succeeded by Joseph A. Califano Jr. as Former U.S. Cabinet Member
