= 1982 Washington, D.C., mayoral election =

- November 2, 1982
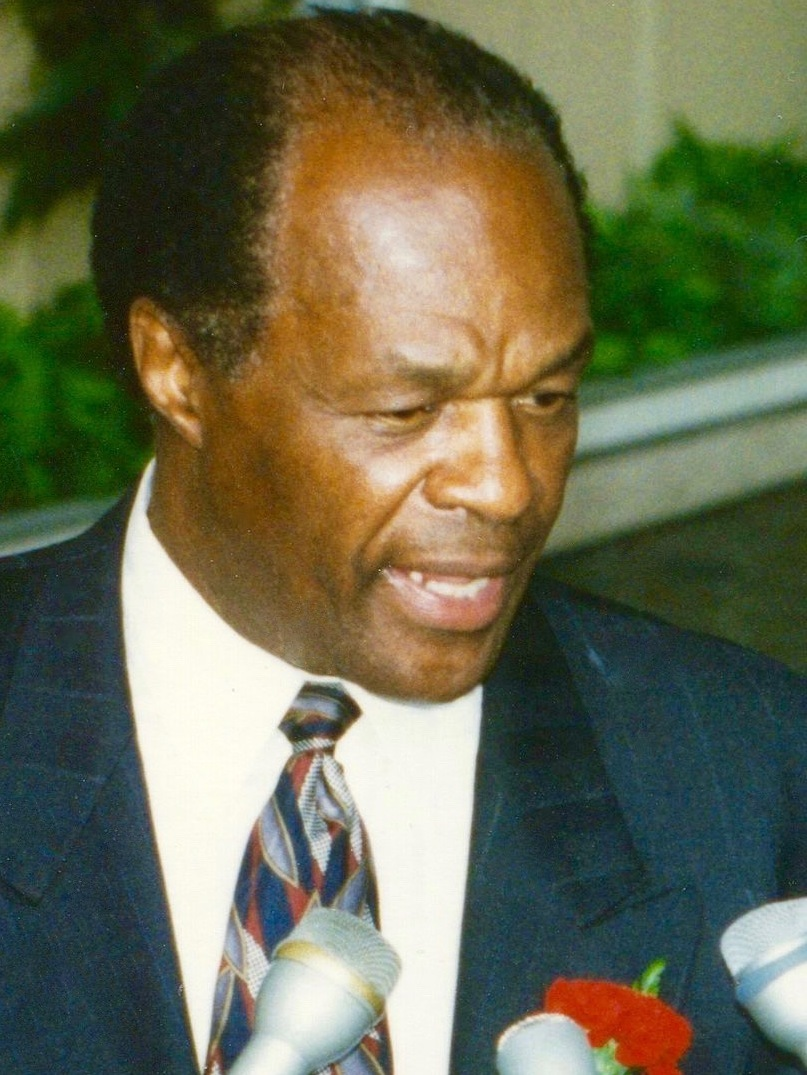

Nominee	Marion Barry	E. Brooke Lee Jr.
Party	Democratic	Republican
Popular vote	95,007	16,501
Percentage	80.99%	14.07%
Mayor before election
Marion Barry
Democratic
Elected mayor
Marion Barry
Democratic

On November 2, 1982, the District of Columbia held an election for its mayor. It resulted in the reelection of incumbent Democratic mayor Marion Barry to a second term, defeating Republican candidate E. Brooke Lee.

== Democratic primary ==
The primary occurred on September 14, 1982.

District of Columbia Democratic primary election, 1986
Party	Candidate	Votes	%
Democratic	Marion Barry (incumbent)	66,336	58.02
Democratic	Patricia Roberts Harris	40,597	35.51
Democratic	John Ray	3,945	3.45
Democratic	Charlene Drew Jarvis	3,307	2.89
	Write-in	144	0.13
Total votes		114,329	100

== General election ==
District of Columbia mayoral election, 1982
Party	Candidate	Votes	%
Democratic	Marion Barry (incumbent)	95,007	80.99
Republican	E. Brooke Lee Jr.	16,501	14.07
Independent	Dennis S. Sobin	2,673	2.28
Socialist Workers	Glenn B. White	1,467	1.25
	Write-in	1,658	1.41
Total votes		117,306	100
Democratic hold			

== See also ==
- Electoral history of Marion Barry
