= United States federal executive departments =

Primary unit of the executive branch of the federal government of the United States

The United States federal executive departments are the principal units of the executive branch of the federal government of the United States. The executive departments are the administrative arms of the president of the United States. They are analogous to ministries common in parliamentary or semi-presidential systems but (the United States being a presidential system) they are led by a head of government who is also the head of state. There are currently 15 executive departments.

== Overview ==
=== Structure ===
Each department is headed by a secretary whose title echoes the title of their respective department, with the exception of the Department of Justice, whose head is known as the attorney general. The heads of the executive departments are appointed by the president and take office after confirmation by the United States Senate, and serve at the pleasure of the president. The heads of departments are members of the Cabinet of the United States, an executive organ that normally acts as an advisory body to the president. In the Opinion Clause (Article II, section 2, clause 1) of the U.S. Constitution, heads of executive departments are referred to as "principal Officer in each of the executive Departments".

The heads of executive departments are included in the line of succession to the president, in the event of a vacancy in the presidency, after the vice president, the speaker of the House, and the president pro tempore of the Senate. They are included in order of their respective department's formation, with the exception of the secretary of defense, whose position in the line of succession is based on when the Department of War was formed.

=== Separation of powers ===
To enforce a strong separation of powers, the federal Constitution's Ineligibility Clause expressly prohibits executive branch employees (including heads of executive departments) from simultaneously serving in Congress, and vice versa. Accordingly, in sharp contrast to parliamentary systems where ministers are often selected to form a government from members of parliament, U.S. legislators who are appointed by the president and confirmed by the Senate to serve as heads of executive departments must resign from Congress before assuming their new positions. If the emoluments for a new appointee's executive branch position were increased while the appointee was previously serving in Congress (e.g., cost of living adjustments), the president must implement a Saxbe fix.

=== Contracting and grantmaking roles ===
The chart below shows that several executive departments (Education, Health and Human Services, Housing and Urban Development, and Transportation) have disproportionately small employee headcounts in contrast to the size of their budgets. This is because many of their employees merely supervise contracts with private independent contractors or grants (especially categorical grants) to state or local government agencies who are primarily responsible for providing services directly to the general public. In the 20th century, when the federal government began to provide funding and supervision for matters which were historically seen as the domain of state governments (i.e., education, health and welfare services, housing, and transportation), Congress frequently authorized only funding for grants which were voluntary, in the sense that state or local government agencies could choose to apply for such grants (and accept conditions attached by Congress) or they could decline to apply. In the case of HHS's Medicare program, Congress chose to contract with private health insurers because they "already possessed the requisite expertise for administering complex health insurance programs", and because American hospitals preferred to continue dealing with private insurers instead of a new federal bureaucracy.

== Current departments ==
Department	Seal	Flag	Formed	Employees (2026)	Total budget (2023)	Head	
Department	Seal	Flag	Formed	Employees (2026)	Total budget (2023)	Title	Titleholder
State			July 27, 1789	11,713	$58.1 billion	Secretary of State	Marco Rubio
Treasury			September 2, 1789	89,881	$16.4 billion	Secretary of the Treasury	Scott Bessent
Interior			March 3, 1849	56,872	$18.9 billion	Secretary of the Interior	Doug Burgum
Agriculture			May 15, 1862	72,049	$242 billion	Secretary of Agriculture	Brooke Rollins
Justice			July 1, 1870	107,415	$37.5 billion	Attorney General	Todd Blanche
Commerce			February 14, 1903	42,084	$16.3 billion	Secretary of Commerce	Howard Lutnick
Labor			March 4, 1913	12,421	$97.5 billion	Secretary of Labor	Keith Sonderling
Defense (War) (Note: A 2025 executive order authorized "Department of War" as a secondary name, which is now preferred by the department. However, "Department of Defense" remains the primary and statutory name, as only an act of Congress can formally rename the department.)			August 7, 1789	707,378	$852 billion	Secretary of Defense (War)	Pete Hegseth
Health and Human Services			April 11, 1953	75,134	$1.772 trillion	Secretary of Health and Human Services	Robert F. Kennedy Jr.
Housing and Urban Development			September 9, 1965	6,299	$61.7 billion	Secretary of Housing and Urban Development	Scott Turner
Transportation			April 1, 1967	53,512	$145 billion	Secretary of Transportation	Sean Duffy
Energy			August 4, 1977	14,955	$45.8 billion	Secretary of Energy	Chris Wright
Education			October 17, 1979	2,453	$79.6 billion	Secretary of Education	Linda McMahon
Veterans Affairs			March 15, 1989	451,121	$308.5 billion	Secretary of Veterans Affairs	Doug Collins
Homeland Security			November 25, 2002	227,584	$101.6 billion	Secretary of Homeland Security	Markwayne Mullin

== Former departments ==
Department	Formed	Removed from Cabinet	Superseded by	Last Cabinet-level head	
Department	Formed	Removed from Cabinet	Superseded by	Title	Titleholder
War	August 7, 1789	September 18, 1947	Department of the Army; Department of the Air Force	Secretary of War	Kenneth Claiborne Royall
Navy	April 30, 1798	August 10, 1949	Department of Defense (as executive department) became and still are military departments within the Department of Defense	Secretary of the Navy	Francis P. Matthews
Army	September 18, 1947	August 10, 1949	Department of Defense (as executive department) became and still are military departments within the Department of Defense	Secretary of the Army	Gordon Gray
Air Force	September 18, 1947	August 10, 1949	Department of Defense (as executive department) became and still are military departments within the Department of Defense	Secretary of the Air Force	Stuart Symington
Post Office	February 20, 1792	July 1, 1971	United States Postal Service	Postmaster General	Winton M. Blount
Commerce and Labor	February 14, 1903	March 4, 1913	Department of Commerce; Department of Labor (The Department of Commerce is considered a continuation of the Department of Commerce and Labor under a new name.)	Secretary of Commerce and Labor	Charles Nagel
Health, Education, and Welfare	April 11, 1953	October 17, 1979	Department of Education; Department of Health and Human Services (The Department of Health and Human Services is considered a continuation of the Department of Health, Education, and Welfare under a new name.)	Secretary of Health, Education, and Welfare	Patricia Roberts Harris

== Proposed departments ==
=== Mergers of existing departments ===
- Department of Natural Resources, proposed by the Eisenhower administration, President Richard Nixon, the 1976 GOP national platform, and by Bill Daley (as a consolidation of the Departments of the Interior and Energy, and the Environmental Protection Agency)
- Department of Economic Affairs, proposed by President Richard Nixon; essentially a consolidation of the Departments of Commerce, Labor, and Agriculture.
- Department of Business, proposed by President Barack Obama as a consolidation of the U.S. Department of Commerce's core business and trade functions, the Small Business Administration, the Office of the U.S. Trade Representative, the Export-Import Bank, the Overseas Private Investment Corporation, and the U.S. Trade and Development Agency
- Department of Commerce and the Workforce, a merger of the Department of Commerce and the Department of Labor proposed in 2011 and 2013 by Senator Richard Burr (R-NC) in S. 1116
- Department of Education and the Workforce, proposed by President Donald Trump as a consolidation of the Departments of Education and Labor
- Department of Economic Development, proposed by Senator Elizabeth Warren to replace the Commerce Department, subsume other agencies like the Small Business Administration and the Patent and Trademark Office, and include research and development programs, worker training programs, and export and trade authorities like the Office of the U.S. Trade Representative with the single goal of creating and defending good American jobs

=== New departments ===
- Department of Industry and Commerce, proposed by Secretary of the Treasury William Windom in a speech given at a Chamber of Commerce dinner in May 1881
- Department of Peace, proposed by Founding Father and signer of the United States Declaration of Independence Benjamin Rush in 1793, Senator Matthew Neely in the 1930s, Congressman Dennis Kucinich in the 2000s, and other members of the U.S. Congress
- Department of Social Welfare, proposed by President Franklin D. Roosevelt in January 1937
- Department of Public Works, proposed by President Franklin D. Roosevelt in January 1937
- Department of Conservation (a renaming of the Department of the Interior), proposed by President Franklin D. Roosevelt in January 1937
- Department of Urban Affairs and Housing, proposed by President John F. Kennedy
- Department of Business and Labor, proposed by President Lyndon B. Johnson
- Department of Community Development, proposed by President Richard Nixon; to be chiefly concerned with rural infrastructure development
- Department of Human Resources, proposed by President Richard Nixon; essentially a revised Department of Health, Education, and Welfare
- Department of Environmental Protection, proposed by Senator Arlen Specter and others
- Department of Intelligence, proposed by former director of national intelligence Mike McConnell
- Department of Global Development, proposed by the Center for Global Development
- Department of Art, proposed by Quincy Jones
- Department of Health and Public Welfare, proposed by President Donald Trump as a renamed Department of Health and Human Services
- Department of Technology, proposed by businessman and 2020 Democratic presidential candidate Andrew Yang
- Department of Culture, patterned on similar departments in many foreign nations, proposed by, among others, Murray Moss and Jeva Lange

== See also ==
- British government departments
- Canadian Federal government departments
- Cabinet of the Confederate States of America
- Cabinet of the United States
- Independent agencies of the United States government
- List of federal agencies in the United States
