= List of graphic designers =

This is a list of notable graphic designers.

== A–C ==
- Reza Abedini
- Otl Aicher
- Alan Aldridge
- John Alvin
- Richard Amsel
- Gail Anderson
- Jeff Arwadi
- Roberto Baldazzini
- Jan Balet
- Marian Bantjes
- Noma Bar
- Jonathan Barnbrook
- Saul Bass
- Herbert Bayer
- Harry Beck
- Félix Beltrán
- Ed Benguiat
- John Bielenberg
- Michael Bierut
- Max Bill
- Giambattista Bodoni
- Irma Boom
- Sheila Levrant de Bretteville
- Alexey Brodovitch
- Neville Brody
- Robert Brownjohn
- Dick Bruna
- Peter Buchanan-Smith
- Jon Burgerman
- Margaret Calvert
- Eric Carle
- Tom Carnase
- Joe Caroff
- David Carson
- Jacqueline Casey
- William Caslon
- Urso Chappell
- Ivan Chermayeff
- Steven Chorney
- Seymour Chwast
- Elaine Lustig Cohen
- Fré Cohen
- Vincent Connare
- Rajie Cook
- Muriel Cooper
- Wim Crouwel
- Stanisław Czerski

== D–F ==
- Louis Danziger
- Alison Donalty
- Stanley Donwood
- Lou Dorfsman
- Aaron Draplin
- Hugh Dubberly
- Charles and Ray Eames
- Tom Eckersley
- Heinz Edelmann
- Dick Elffers
- Siavash Fani
- Edward Fella
- Pablo Ferro
- Friedrich Kurt Fiedler
- Louise Fili
- Vittorio Fiorucci
- Clifton Firth
- Alan Fletcher
- Colin Forbes
- Janet Froelich
- Adrian Frutiger
- Shigeo Fukuda

== G–I ==
- Ken Garland
- Tom Geismar
- Steff Geissbühler
- Michael Gericke
- Karl Gerstner
- Bob Gill
- Eric Gill
- Milton Glaser
- Carin Goldberg
- Denise Gonzales Crisp
- April Greiman
- Rick Griffith
- Catrin G. Grosse
- Rudolf Grüttner
- Bugra Gulsoy
- Shekhar Gurera
- Hansje van Halem
- Dave Halili
- Baron Barrymore Halpenny
- Dorothy E. Hayes
- Jessica Helfand
- Steven Heller
- Kate Hepburn
- Fons Hickmann
- Jon Hicks
- The Brothers Hildebrandt
- Jessica Hische
- Armin Hofmann
- Julian House
- Max Huber
- Gerard Huerta
- Hans Hulsbosch
- Angus Hyland
- Mirko Ilić
- Breuk Iversen
- Norman Ives

== J–L ==
- Tariq Jakobsen
- Aurélien Jeanney
- Tom Jung
- Tibor Kalman
- Stefan Kanchev
- Ronald Kapaz
- Ilonka Karasz
- Susan Kare
- Ruth Kedar
- Jeffery Keedy
- Chip Kidd
- Jock Kinneir
- Burton Kramer
- Martin Krampen
- Barbara Kruger
- Nedim Kufi
- Martin Kvamme
- Walter Landor
- Poul Lange
- Zuzana Licko
- John Lloyd
- Herb Lubalin
- Ellen Lupton

== M–O ==
- John Maeda
- O'Plérou
- Martin Majoor
- Aldus Manutius
- Oscar Mariné
- Karel Martens
- Bruce Mau
- Katherine McCoy
- Dave McKean
- Philip B. Meggs
- Bruce Mau
- Debbie Millman
- Ron Miriello
- László Moholy-Nagy
- Morteza Momayez
- Aries Moross
- William Morris
- Josef Müller-Brockmann
- Bruno Munari
- Erik Nitsche
- Bob Noorda
- Wally Olins
- Vaughan Oliver
- István Orosz

== P–S ==
- Fra Paalman
- Robert L. Peters
- Clive Piercy
- Woody Pirtle
- Leif Podhajsky
- Soundarya Rajinikanth
- Nadhim Ramzi
- Paul Rand
- Satyajit Ray
- Mikhail Rojter
- Tina Roth-Eisenberg
- Dolly Rudeman
- Emil Ruder
- Mehdi Saeedi
- Stefan Sagmeister
- Louise Sandhaus
- Peter Saville
- Jan Sawka
- Paula Scher
- Paul Schuitema
- Peter Seitz
- Ghobad Shiva
- Bonnie Siegler
- Christopher Simmons
- Erik Spiekermann
- Drew Struzan
- Hugh Syme

== T–V ==
- Aaron Tanner
- Marc Tedeschi
- Jake Tilson
- Henryk Tomaszewski
- Ivana Tomljenović-Meller
- George Tscherny
- Jan Tschichold
- Carol Twombly
- Rudy VanderLans
- James Victore
- Massimo Vignelli

== W–Z ==
- Jurek Wajdowicz
- Jessica Walsh
- Brian Webb
- Wolfgang Weingart
- Lynda Weinman
- Bob West
- Lorraine Wild
- Michael Wolff
- Lance Wyman
- Kijuro Yahagi
- Yuri Yokomizo
- Pilar Zeta
- Piet Zwart

== See also ==
- List of lists of artists by nationality
- List of Polish graphic designers
