= Siavash (name) =

- Gender: Male

Origin
- Origin: Persian
- Meaning: from Avestan " Syâvaršan", the one with black stallions

Siavash (Persian: سياوش) is an Iranian male given name. It was popularized by Siyâvash (Persian: سیاوش) or Siyavash (Persian: سياووش), a legendary prince who is a major figure in Ferdowsi's epic, the Shahnameh.

Notable people with the name Siavash, Siyâvash, or various other transliterations from Persian/Azerbaijani languages include:

== Mononym ==
- Siyawush, Iranian officer who served as the head of the Sasanian army during the second reign of the Sasanian shah Kavad I (r. 498–531)
- Siyavakhsh, Iranian aristocrat from the House of Mihran who was descended from Bahram Chobin, the famous spahbed of the Sasanian Empire
- Siyâvush Beg Gorji (fl. 16th century), Iranian illustrator
- Siyavosh Beg (died 1650s), Safavid military commander and official

== Given name ==
- Siavash Akbarpour, Iranian football player and coach
- Siavash Alamouti, Iranian-born Canadian and American business executive
- Sayavush Aslan (1935–2013), Azerbaijani actor
- Siavash Bakhtiarizadeh (born 1961), Iranian football manager
- Siavash Daneshvar, Iranian activist
- Siavosh Derakhti (born 1991), Swedish activist
- Siavash Fani, Canadian graphic designer
- Siavash Ghomayshi, Iranian musician, singer and song writer
- Siavash Hagh Nazari, Iranian professional footballer
- Sayavush Hasanov (1964–1992), Azerbaijani soldier and construction worker
- Siavash Kasrai, Iranian poet, literary critic and novelist
- Siyavosh Mozayani
- Siyavush Novruzov, Azerbaijani politician
- Siavash Saffari, professor
- Siavash Shahshahani, Iranian mathematician
- Siavash Shams, Iranian singer, songwriter, record producer
- Siavash Teimouri (born 1937), Iranian architect and activist
- Siavash Yazdani, Iranian professional footballer

== Surname ==
- Aydan Siyavuş (1947–1998), Turkish basketball coach
- Baktash Siawash, Afghan Politician
- Kayvan Soufi Siavash (born 1966), Iranian-German radio host

== See also ==
- Siyavuş Pasha, several Ottoman persons
