= Siyavash (disambiguation) =

Siyâvash (Persian: سیاوش) is an Iranian legendary prince, and a major figure in Ferdowsi's epic the Shahnameh.

Siyavash, Siavash, Siyavash, or Siyavush, or other transliterations, may also refer to:

- Siavash (name)
- Siyavash (film), an Iranian film
- Siavash (TV series), 2020 Iranian TV series
- Siyavash (opera), an Iranian opera by Loris Tjeknavorian
- Siyavush (play), 1933 play by Huseyn Javid
- Siyavash (video game), an Iranian video game
- Siyavash, Nishapur, a village in Nishapur County, Razavi Khorasan province, Iran
- Siyavash sniper rifle, an Iranian rifle

== See also ==
- Siyavuş Pasha (disambiguation), several Ottoman persons
