= Miriello =

Miriello is a surname. Notable people with the surname include:

- Amie Miriello, American singer-songwriter and guitarist
- Ron Miriello (born 1953), American graphic designer, sculptor and speaker
