= Gail Swanlund =

American graphic designer

Gail Swanlund (born 1963) is a contemporary graphic designer and writer who describes her work as living "at the intersection of real world practice of graphic design and design as art form, with a deep respect for natural and supernatural systems." Swanlund was born in Saint Paul, Minnesota in 1963. She lives and works in Los Angeles, moving within a community of graphic designers making "literate, intelligent work" such as Anne Burdick, Denise Gonzales Crisp, Jens Gehlhaar, Geoff Kaplan, Geoff McFetridge, Louise Sandhaus, Alexei Tylevich and Michael Worthington.

Swanlund has contributed to the influential experimental graphic design magazine Emigre as both writer and designer. She has also been a designer for the vanguard artist magazines Artpaper and RealLife, as well as the literary journal BlackClock. Her work is part of the San Francisco Museum of Modern Art (SFMOMA) permanent collection. Her creative work has been exhibited at San Francisco Museum of Modern Art (SFMoMA), Los Angeles Contemporary Exhibitions (LACE), CAM Raleigh, Pomona College, and at the Biennial of Graphic Design in Brno, Czech Republic.Her work has been acquired by many public collections, including Getty Research Institute, Los Angeles County Museum of Art (LACMA), Merrill C. Berman Collection, SFMoMA and LACE.

She is currently a full-time faculty member and former co-director of the design program at CalArts. As CalArts faculty, she teaches graphic design and typography, and co-teaches courses and workshops with faculty from other schools across the Institute.

Swanlund sits on the board of DesignInquiry, a non-profit educational organization devoted to researching design issues in intensive team-based gatherings.

Her personal website contains current work and events as well as a vault of past work including Snowflake and Emigre.
