= Lorraine Wild =

Canadian-born American graphic designer

- Born: 1953 (age 72–73); Ontario, Canada
- Education: Cranbrook Academy of Art

Lorraine Wild (born 1953, Ontario, Canada) is a Canadian-born American graphic designer, writer, art historian, and teacher. She is an AIGA Medalist and principal of Green Dragon Office, a design firm that focuses on collaborative work with artists, architects, curators, editors and publishers. Wild is based in Los Angeles, California.

== Early life and education ==
In 1973, Wild entered the Cranbrook Academy of Art program which was, at the time, under the leadership of Michael and Katherine McCoy. In 1975, she received her B.F.A. degree in graphic design.

Two years later, she moved to New York to work for Vignelli Associates from 1977 to 1978. During this time, she was researching the history of American graphic design post World War II. This personal interest of research led her to further studying at Yale University where she earned an M.F.A. degree in 1982. While at Yale University, she designed Perspecta 19, which was Yale's architectural journal. Along with Perspecta 19, she also designed the Chamber Works and Theatrum Mundi portfolios for the architect Daniel Libeskind, and the book of architect John Hejduk entitled Mask of Medusa in 1985. Her work on the designs of these books helped launch her fast-growing reputation for thoughtful and distinctive design in books on architecture, art, and design. Her MFA thesis entitled "Trends in American Graphic Design: 1930–1955" was recognized as an important contribution to design scholarship and led to many commissions for essays. From here on, her reputation continued to soar and her work earned national recognition.

== Career ==
=== 1980s ===
While teaching at the University of Houston's architecture school during the early 1980s, Wild wrote the essay "More Than A Few Questions about Graphic Design Education" (1983), first published in The Design Journal. In the article, she gives a provocative analysis which became the driving force for recharacterizing graphic design education in the United States. This led to her being hired as graphic design program director at the California Institute of the Arts in Valencia in 1985. During her time as director, she developed and implemented a new model for graphic design education that emphasized the process of conveying meaning through experimental, conceptual, and formal development. The program challenged modernist graphic design methodology by encouraging students to use personal and emotional experiences to their work. She continued to stay on the Cal Arts faculty after she stepped down as program director in 1991.

=== 1990s ===
From 1991 to 1998, she served as project tutor at the Jan van Eyck Akademie in Maastricht, Netherlands. Lorraine Wild was one of the founders of the design office ReVerb, which was the recipient of the 1995 Chrysler Award for Innovation in Design. She left ReVerb in 1996 to start her own company Lorraine Wild Design. As a side project, she partnered with Roman Alonso and Lisa Eisner in 1999 to establish Greybull Press. Greybull Press was an imprint specializing in the publication of photographic archives and collections that were considered potentially influential to tastemakers. Lorraine Wild Design was later renamed the Green Dragon Office in 2004. The Green Dragon Office focused on collaborations with architects, artists, curators, and publishers in the United States and abroad and has designed catalogs for exhibitions at museums including MOCA, UCLA's Hammer Museum, the Getty Center, and the Whitney Museum of American Art in New York. In 1998, the San Francisco Museum of Modern Art held the exhibition "Lorraine Wild: Selections from the Permanent Collection," a display of work that the museum regards as their collection of significant design produced in California. Throughout the 1990s and 2000s, Wild sporadically contributed to Emigre, publishing a variety of critical essays such as "That was Then, and This is Now: But What is Next?".

=== 2000s ===
In 2005, she became a regular contributor to Design Observer, the design commentary and criticism website. She has also served on the National Board of the AIGA and on the design advisory board for the international Design Conference at Aspen, Colorado. She loves the works of designers W.A. Dwiggins, who reinvented American typography by bringing arts-and-crafts values to design for machine production; Alvin Lustig, an architect, printer, educator, who refused to specialize; Imre Reiner, an anti-Modernist typographer in Switzerland who rebelled against "objectivity"; Sister Corita Kent, a Southern California nun and printmaker who, in the 1960s, seized upon the idea of using the language of pop culture to speak to her local audience about spirituality, subverting, and appropriating to communicate; and Edward Fella, who mutated out of "commercial art" by working on problems only as he defined them and his commitment to anti-mastery.

She has written monographs on artists and architects as Mike Kelley and Ludwig Mies van der Rohe, as well as books and exhibition catalogues for institutions such as Whitney Museum of American Art, Museum of Contemporary Art in Los Angeles, The Getty Museum, UCLA's Hammer Museum, and the Canadian Centre for Architecture, Montréal." Her visual work has been formed around typographic detail and formal invention and analysis.

=== 2010s ===
In September 2010, she wrote an article in the Design Observatory Group website entitled "The Black Rule". According to Wild, the Black Rule is "intimately connected to a typographic grid, and the paper it's printed on." The color black symbolizes importance and, in the case of The Black Rule, formality. The Black Rule also defines the dimensions of a piece of paper and separates the hierarchy of heads and subheads. The text that is used for The Black Rule is, commonly, Helvetica. This is evident in our every day life whether we notice it or not is the question. The most noticeable signs of The Black Rule is on subway signs or on U.S. Park Service maps. Wild was not the founder or inventor of The Black Rule. Massimo Vignelli is credited for discovering The Black Rule. This became his own brand although it was not typical, at the time, for designers to have a certain icon to represent his or her own work. Vignelli's most popular works is designing the American Airlines logo and the iconic New York City Subway maps.

Wild is the principal of Green Dragon Office in Los Angeles, a design firm that focuses on collaborative work with artists, architects, curators, editors and publishers which has been active since 1996; she is also the creative director of design at the Los Angeles County Museum of Art. Wild continues to be associated with the design program at the California Institute of the Arts. She is also a partner (along with Kristine McKenna and Donna Wingate) in Foggy Notion Books. Past collaborations include a partnership with Louise Sandhaus and Rick Valicenti in Wild LuV, and a co-editorship with Roman Alonso and Lisa Eisher in Greybull Press of Los Angeles.

== Awards ==
In 1988, Liz McQuiston selected Lorraine Wild as one of forty-three women in six countries whose work is innovative or has had significant impact in their chosen fields of design. The other American graphic designers included Jacqueline Casey, Muriel Cooper, June Fraser, April Greiman, Katherine McCoy. She was one of three finalists for the 2001 Communication Award of the National Design Awards sponsored by the Smithsonian's Cooper-Hewitt National Design Museum. She was awarded a gold medal by the New York Art Director's Club for the design of Height of Fashion. She received awards from organizations such as the American Center for Design, the American Institute of Graphic Arts’ (AIGA) "50 Best Books of the Year," the American Institute of Architects and the American Association of University Publishers. Her writing has appeared in many periodicals and books that include Émigré, ID, Print, Graphic Design in America, Cranbrook Design: The New Discourse, Lift & Separate, Looking Closer, and The Education of a GraphicDesigner.

Wild was the recipient of a 2006 AIGA medal. The medal of AIGA—the most distinguished in the field—is awarded to individuals in recognition of their exceptional achievements, services or other contributions to the field of design and visual communication.

== Personal life ==
She is married to John Kaliski, AIA, principal of the Los Angeles architectural and urban planning firm John Kaliski Architects.

== See also ==
- List of AIGA medalists
