= Breuk Iversen =

American designer and writer (born 1964)

- Born: July 25, 1964 (age 62); Brooklyn, New York, U.S.
- Education: School of Visual Arts
- Occupations: Designer and writer
- Known for: "Salon des Refuses": The Offal Project, 11211 Magazine
- Notable work: 11211 Magazine, The Box Map, 10003 Magazine
- Awards: Communication Arts, Art Directors Club
- Website: binknyc.com

Breuk Iversen (born July 25, 1964) is an American designer and writer. He is known for launching 11211 Magazine and creating 2003 site-specific exhibit "Offal: Salon des Refuses", with Jan McLaughlin, at the Dam, Stuhltrager Gallery, that explored issues of economy, aesthetics, politics and popular culture through society's byproducts.

== Biography ==
Breuk Iversen was born in the Sunset Park area of Brooklyn, New York, the first of two children born of Frank Iversen and Joanne Iversen.

In 1999 he graduated from School of Visual Arts (SVA) where he studied under James Victore, Tony Palladino, Steven Brower, and Milton Glaser. In his second year at SVA, he opened a design firm named Disciplined Beauty on Fifth Avenue in New York.

== 11211 Magazine ==
Iversen published several magazines, including 11211 Magazine.
