= Peter Lunenfeld =

American media scholar (born 1962)

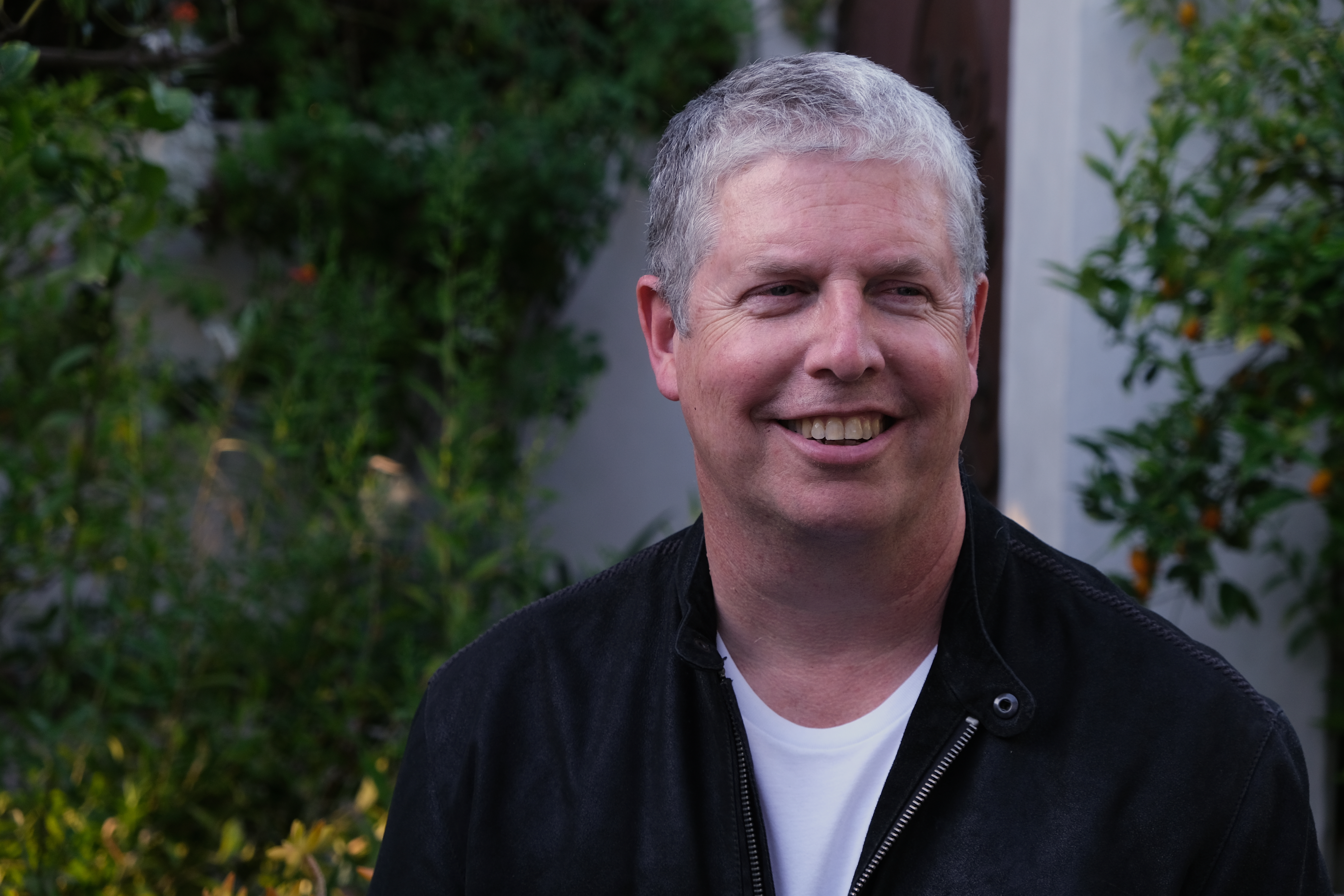
- Peter Lunenfeld
- Born: 1962 (age 63–64); New York City, U.S.
- Occupations: Critic, theorist, professor
- Employer: University of California, Los Angeles
- Known for: Humanities and media studies
- Notable work: City at the Edge of Forever; Digital_Humanities; USER; Snap to Grid; The Digital Dialectic
- Title: Professor, Design Media Arts; Director, Institute for Technology and Aesthetics (ITA)
- Awards: IAAC Internal Award for Art Criticism (2016); Dorothy Lee Prize for Scholarship (2013); Fellowships at Huntington Library, USC Annenberg, Columbia University
- Website: peterlunenfeld.com

Peter Lunenfeld (born 1962, in New York City) is a critic and theorist of digital media, digital humanities, and urban humanities. He is a professor in the Design Media Arts department at the University of California, Los Angeles (UCLA); director of the Institute for Technology and Aesthetics (ITA); and founder of mediawork: The Southern California New Media Group.

Lunenfeld is a leading figure in digital aesthetic theory, set on establishing philosophical quandaries regarding digital technology and its role in art, design and culture. Jan Baetens has written that his work "can be compared to that of McLuhan, Adorno (one will think here of Minima Moralia), and Dewey." Lunenfeld incorporates traditional and continental theories of art and design to account for digital media. His work revolves around the discourses of technology, aesthetics, and cultural theory, establishing the complexity of digital aesthetics while simultaneously categorizing it.

Lunenfeld has a B.A. in history from Columbia University, an MA in Media Studies from the University of Buffalo, and a PhD from UCLA in Film & Television. He worked as the Applications Coordinator at the hardware and software company Lyon Lamb. Honors and fellowships include a 2016 Internal Award for Art Criticism (from the IAAC), the Dorothy Lee Prize for Scholarship in 2013 (from the MEA), and fellowships at the Bergman Estate on Fårö Island, the Huntington Library (Dana and David Dornsife Fellow, 2015–16), USC Annenberg Center (Vectors, 2007), and the Columbia University Institute for Scholars at Reid Hall in Paris (2005). He lives in Los Angeles, California.

Lunenfeld was the editorial director of the Mediawork pamphlet series for the MIT Press. The series featured commissioned writings that weave life stories into "theoretical and critical praxis." These award-winning "theoretical fetish objects" cover the intersections of art, design, technology, and market culture. Included in the series is Utopian Entrepreneur (2001) by Brenda Laurel, designed by Denise Gonzales Crisp; Writing Machines (2002) by N. Katherine Hayles, designed by Anne Burdick; Rhythm Science (2004) by Paul D. Miller aka DJ Spooky that Subliminal Kid, designed by COMA; and, Shaping Things (2005) by Bruce Sterling, designed by Lorraine Wild. Lev Manovich, the author of The Language of New Media, lauded these 100-page "mind bombs" in the tradition of McLuhan and Fiore¹s The Medium Is the Massage as a new operating system for the book.

Recent books include PROMPT: Art and Design in the Age of Artificial Intelligence, produced with Mieke Gerritzen (2026) and an alternate, connectionist history of Southern California's cultural lives, City at the Edge of Forever: Los Angeles Reimagined (2020). The Secret War Between Downloading and Uploading: Tales of the Computer as Culture Machine and Digital_Humanities, co-authored with Anne Burdick, Johanna Drucker, Todd Presner, and Jeffrey Schnapp, were both published in 2011.

== Books ==
- Peter Lunenfeld and Mieke Gerritzen: PROMPT: Art and Design in the Age of Artificial Intelligence, BIS, October 2026 ISBN 978-9-063-69800-3
- Peter Lunenfeld: City at the Edge of Forever: Los Angeles Reimagined, Viking, August 2020 ISBN 978-0-525-56193-4
- Peter Lunenfeld, Anne Burdick, Johanna Drucker, Todd Presner, Jeffrey Schnapp: Digital Humanities, MIT Press, November 2012 ISBN 978-0-262-31211-0
- Peter Lunenfeld: The Secret War Between Downloading and Uploading: Tales of the Computer as Culture Machine, MIT Press, April 2011 ISBN 978-0-262-01547-9
- Peter Lunenfeld: USER:InfoTechnoDemo, MIT Press (2005), visuals Mieke Gerritzen ISBN 0-262-62198-3
- Peter Lunenfeld: Snap to Grid: A User's Guide to Digital Arts, Media and Cultures, MIT Press (2000) ISBN 0-262-62158-4
- Peter Lunenfeld, ed.: The Digital Dialectic: New Essays on New Media, MIT Press (1999) ISBN 0-262-62137-1
