= Kenneth G. Libbrecht =

American physicist

- Born: June 1958 (age 68); Fargo, North Dakota, USA
- Education: Caltech (BS,1980), Princeton (PhD,1984)
- Awards: Newton Lacy Pierce Prize (1991); National Outdoor Book Award (2004); IBPA Book Award (2004); Lennart Nilsson Award (2010)
- Scientific career
- Fields: Crystal Growth, Solar Astronomy, Helioseismology, LIGO, AMO Physics, Undergraduate physics laboratory teaching
- Workplaces: Caltech, 1984-present
- Doctoral advisor: Robert Dicke

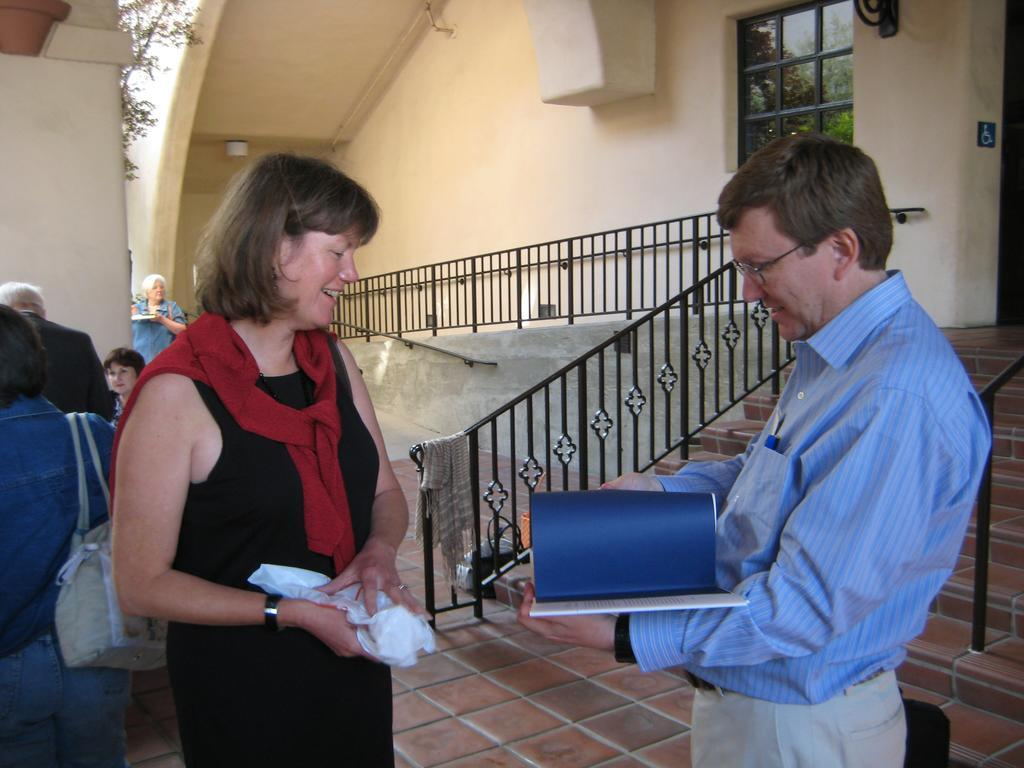
Kenneth Libbrecht signs a book.

Kenneth G. Libbrecht is an American physicist whose research has focused on crystal growth, gravitational wave detection, laser cooling and trapping of neutral atoms, helioseismology, and physics laboratory teaching. He has been a Professor of Physics at the California Institute of Technology (a.k.a. Caltech) since 1984, and he was the physics department chair from 1997-2013.

== Biography ==
Libbrecht graduated from West Fargo High School in 1976, attended one year at the University of North Dakota, and then continued his studies at Caltech, where he received a B.S. in physics in 1980. He further studied as a graduate student under Robert Dicke at Princeton University, where he measured the solar oblateness as a test of General Relativity, receiving his Ph.D. in 1984.

Libbrecht won the 2004 National Outdoor Book Award (Nature & Environment category) for The Snowflake. Libbrecht was a scientific consultant on snowflakes for the 2013 Film Frozen.

Four of Libbrecht's snowflake pictures were selected by the United States Postal Service as designs for stamps for the 2006 winter holiday season, with a total printing of approximately 3 billion stamps. In 2010, Libbrecht was the recipient of the Lennart Nilsson Award. In conjunction with the award, the Swedish postal service, PostNord, released a series of stamps featuring some of his images of snowflakes.
