= Jim Simon (writer) =

American comic writer and historian

- Jim Simon
- Occupations: Writer, comics historian
- Known for: The Comic Book Makers
- Notable work: The Comic Book Makers; The Art of the Simon & Kirby Studio; Astounding, Mysterious, Weird & True: The Pulp Art of Comic Book Artists

Jim Simon is an American writer and editor. He is known for his work writing about the early comic book industry and for contributing to publications related to comics history. He has also created and written comics, humor, and novels. He has worked with Marvel Comics, Titan Books, Abrams ComicArts, HarperCollins, and other publishers.

== Early life and education ==
Simon earned a bachelor's degree in literature from the State University of New York at Stony Brook and studied copywriting at the School of Visual Arts in New York City. He is the son of Joe Simon, and, while working in the Simon studio, learned publication production, reviewed scripts, gained experience in editing and scriptwriting, and was exposed to the business side of publishing and licensing.

== Work on comics history ==
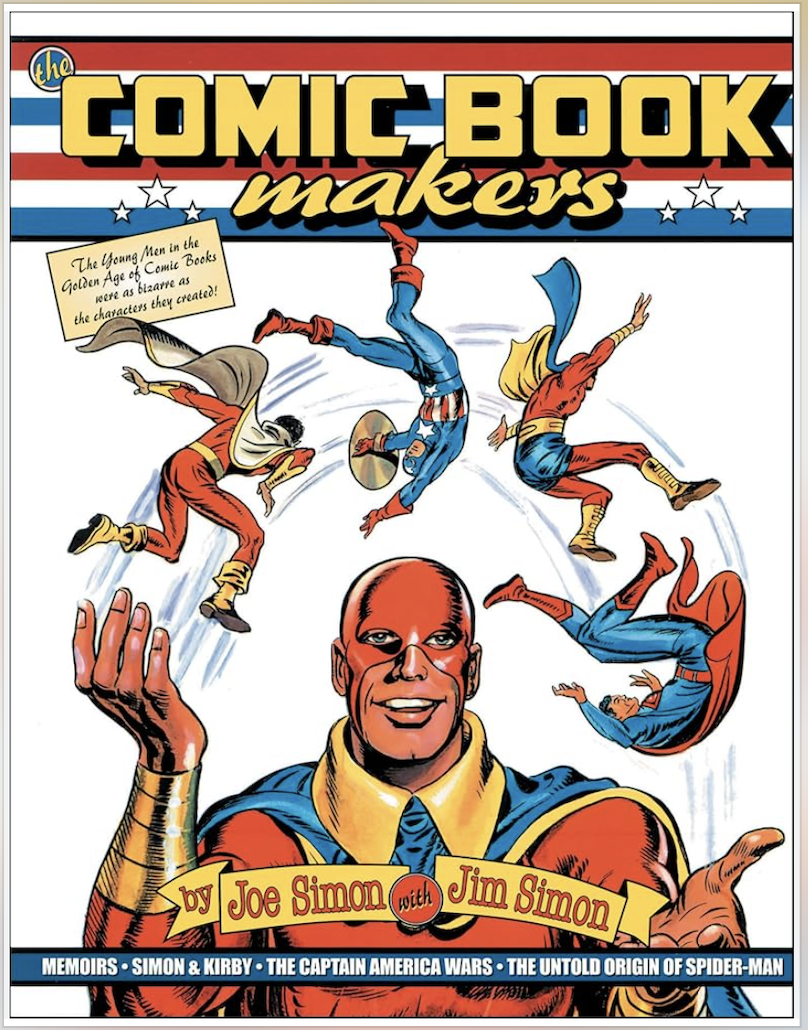

Simon wrote The Comic Book Makers with Joe Simon, which chronicles the early history of the American comic book industry. The book has been cited in peer-reviewed academic studies and referenced in recognized historical studies of comics, including Gerard Jones's Men of Tomorrow and David Hajdu's The Ten-Cent Plague.

In The Art of the Simon and Kirby Studio published by Abrams ComicArts, he discusses the studio's operations and creative output. In The Simon and Kirby Superheroes published by Titan Books, he explores the creative work during the 1940s and 1950s.

In collaboration with Steven Brower, Simon wrote Astounding, Mysterious, Weird & True: The Pulp Art of Comic Book Artists. The book investigates the pulp magazine work of early comic book artists.

His work on comic book history has appeared in various publications, including Alter Ego, Comic Book Artist, and the 2006 edition of The New Book of Knowledge.

== Comic book creations ==
Simon has created and scripted original, creator-owned comic book characters/properties, including ShieldMaster, which debuted in Comic Book Marketplace in 1998, and later appeared in Strange, Futura, and Étranges Aventures, published by Organic Comix. Another creator-owned character, Spyder-Fly, also appeared in Strange and Étranges Aventures.

In 2011, a hardcover French edition of his graphic novel ShieldMaster: L'envol du Phoenix was published by Organic Comix/Carabas, distributed by Hachette, followed in 2016 by an English-language edition titled ShieldMaster: The Phoenix Project, released by FutureRetro Entertainment. In 2020, Organic Comix published a French edition of his Les Mystères de Camp Hero.

An edition of the American ShieldMaster series was released in 2024, featuring contributions from Tom Morgan and Bob Layton, with an introduction by Alan Moore. That same year, KillShott and In Pursuit of Dead-Bolt were release, created and written by Simon.

== Editorial and other writing ==
Simon wrote the introduction, The Classic Wild West Action Team, for The Kid Cowboys of Boys' Ranch published by Marvel Comics. During the 1970s, he contributed editorial and written content to humor magazines including Crazy Magazine published by Marvel Comics, Sick, National Crumb, and Something Else, serving as editor for several of these publications.

Simon is the author of The Monster Channel, a middle grade horror novel published by Avon Books, an imprint of HarperCollins, as part of its Spinetinglers series. He also contributed to the development and writing of the science fiction concept Jove: U.N. Born, which was expanded into a film treatment.

In the 1970s, Leisure Books and Belmont Tower Books released books written by Simon satirizing popular media franchises such as King Kong, The Six Million Dollar Man, and The Bionic Woman. The books are included in the Miller Collection of Wit and Humor at Brown University Library.

Simon provided creative input on comic book titles including Brother Power the Geek, Prez, The Outsiders, and The Sandman which were developed and produced at Joe Simon's studio and published by DC Comics.

He is also the author of two limited-edition literary works, the novel The Far Away, and Crane's Neck.

== Media appearances and public speaking ==
Simon was interviewed in the ABC television documentary Marvel's Captain America: 75 Heroic Years. He has been a panelist at comic-related events, including Big Apple Comic Con and New York Comic Con, where he discussed comic book history. His article for the official Comic-Con International Souvenir Book was published for San Diego Comic-Con International. He was interviewed by David Garland on WNYC public radio, discussing The Comic Book Makers and preserving comic book history.
