= Briar Levit =

American graphic designer

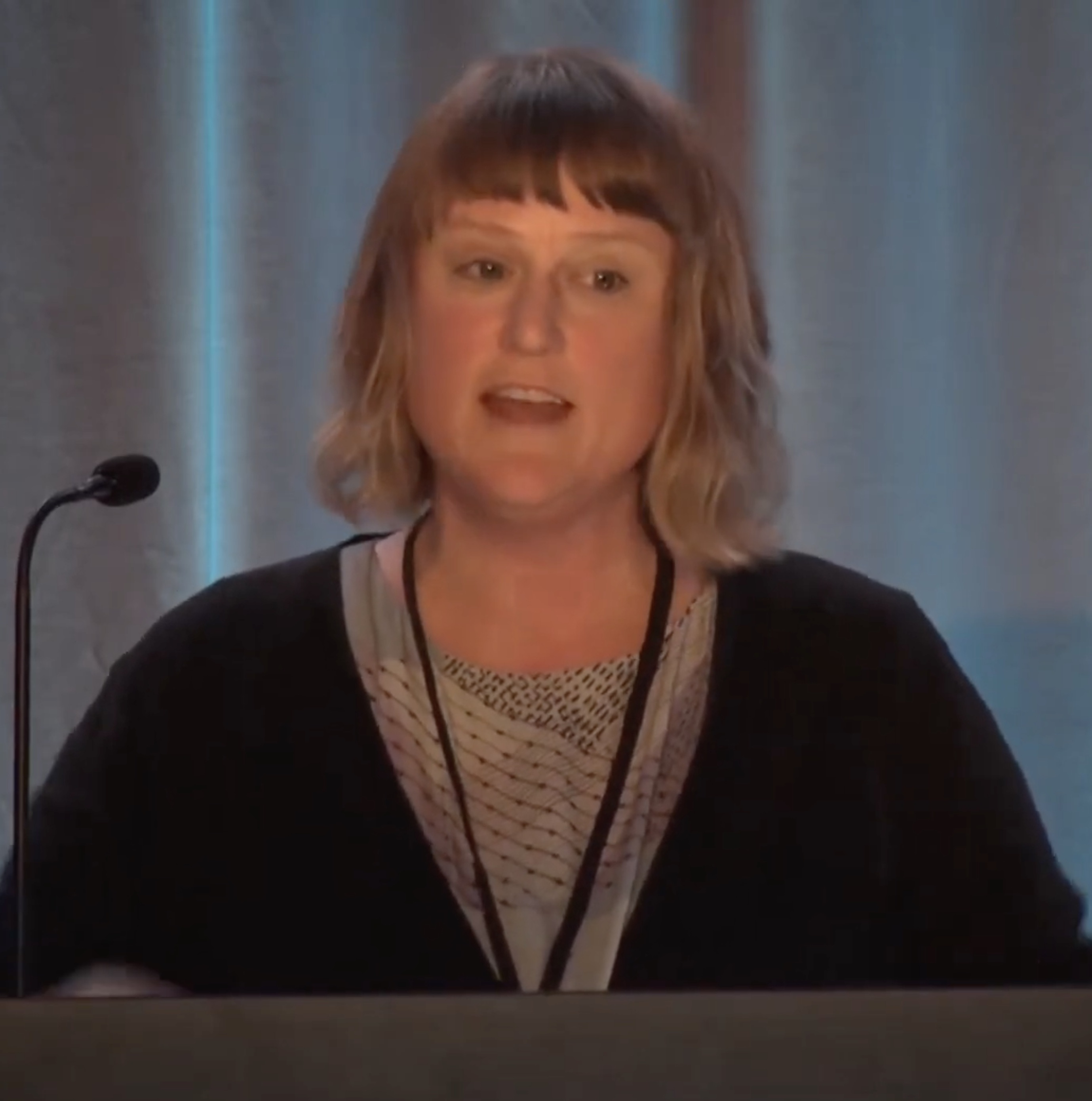
- Levit speaking at TypeCon in Portland, Oregon in 2018
- Occupation: Professor of graphic design
- Notable work: Baseline Shift (book), Graphic Means (documentary film)

Briar Levit is an American design educator, art director and graphic designer. As of June 2025, she is a professor of graphic design at Portland State University. Levit directed and produced Graphic Means: A History of Graphic Design Production, a feature documentary about graphic design production methods before desktop publishing. She is the editor of a book of essays Baseline Shift: Untold Stories of Women in Graphic Design History (2021) and author of Briar Levit: On Design, Feminism, and Friendship (2024).

Levit is a co-director and co-founder of The People’s Graphic Design Archive, a crowd-sourced digital collection of graphic design, with designers Louise Sandhaus and Brockett Horne.

Levit grew up in the San Francisco Bay Area. She is a graduate of San Francisco State University and Central Saint Martins College of Art and Design in London. Levit came to prominence in graphic design as art director of Bitch, a quarterly feminist magazine published between 1996 and 2022.

Levit's 2017 film Graphic Means focuses on “cold type” graphic production, spanning techniques like photosetting, strike-on, and rubdown lettering like Letraset. It includes interviews with Steven Heller, Ellen Lupton, April Greiman, Ken Garland, Adrian Shaughnessy, Tobias Frere-Jones, Dan Rhatigan and Art Chantry. It was shown at the ByDesign film festival in Seattle, Dundee Design Festival, Design Manchester festival, and Birmingham Design Festival. An independent film funded through a Kickstarter campaign, it was made with an all-female production team.
