= Lennart Nilsson Award =

- Description: Outstanding contributions to scientific photography
- Country: Sweden
- Presented by: Karolinska Institutet
- Reward: SEK 120,000
- Website: ki.se/en/about/the-lennart-nilsson-award

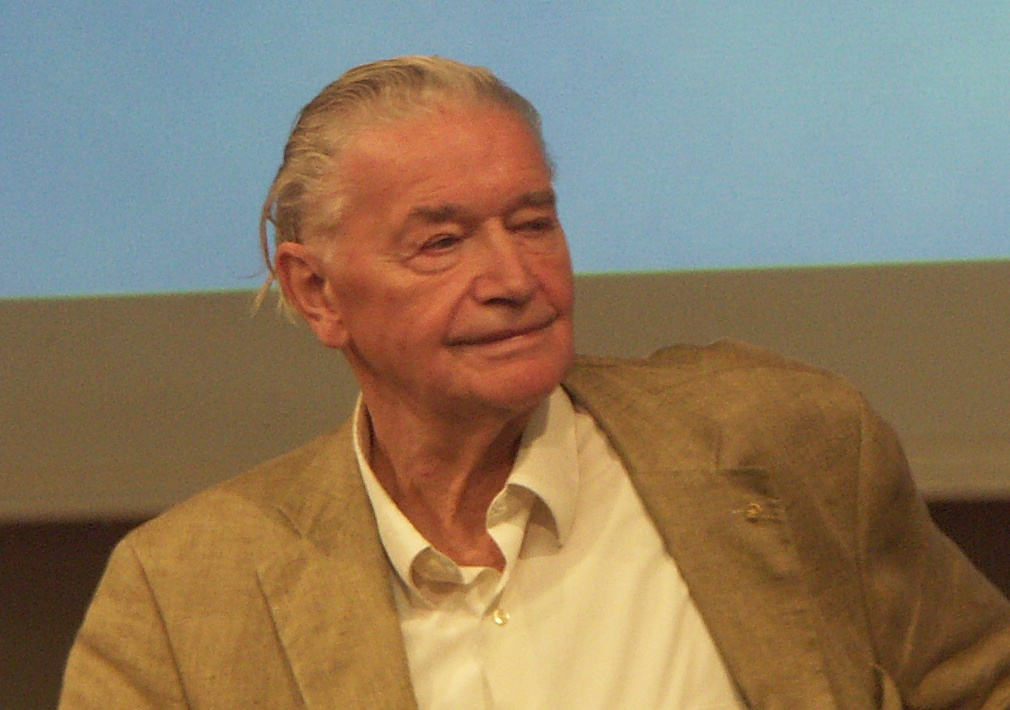

The Lennart Nilsson Award recognizes outstanding contributions to scientific photography. Honorees are chosen based on the merits of their efforts in scientific imagery. It is administered by the foundation Stiftelsen Lennart Nilsson and awarded annually by Karolinska Institutet. The award sum is SEK 120,000. The award was inaugurated in 1998 in honor of Swedish photographer and scientist Lennart Nilsson (1922–2017) .

== Award recipients ==
According to the society's published list of award recipients:

- Nils Åslund, Royal Institute of Technology (KTH), Stockholm - 1998
- James Henderson - 1999
- David Malin, Anglo-Australian Observatory - 2000
- David Doubilet - 2001
- Oliver Meckes and Nicole Ottawa - 2002
- David Barlow, University of Southampton - 2003
- Göran Scharmer, Institute for Solar Physics - 2004
- Frans Lanting - 2005
- Satoshi Kuribayashi -2006
- Felice Frankel Harvard University and Massachusetts Institute of Technology - 2007
- Anders Persson, Linköping University - 2008
- Carolyn Porco, Space Science Institute and Babak Amin Tafreshi - 2009
- Kenneth Libbrecht, California Institute of Technology - 2010
- Nancy Kedersha, Harvard Medical School - 2011
- Hans Blom, Royal Institute of Technology (KTH), Stockholm - 2012
- Timothy Behrens, University of Oxford -2014
- Katrin Willig, Max Planck Institute for Experimental Medicine in Göttingen, Germany - 2015
- Alexey Amunts, Stockholm University -2016
- Xiaowei Zhuang, Harvard University - 2017
- Thomas Deerinck, University of California, San Diego - 2018
- Ed Boyden, Massachusetts Institute of Technology - 2019
- Jan Husiken, Morgridge Institute Madison - 2020
- Stephen Gschmeissner, Royal College of Surgeons and Cancer Research, UK - 2021
- Martin Oeggerli, Micronaut, Switzerland - 2022
- Fredrik Pleijel, University of Gothenburg, Sweden - 2023
- Csaba Adori, Karolinska Institutet, Sweden - 2024
- Maximilian Ackermann, RWTH University Clinics Aachen and Helios University Clinics, Wuppertal, Germany - 2025
