= Kristine McKenna =

American journalist, critic and art curator

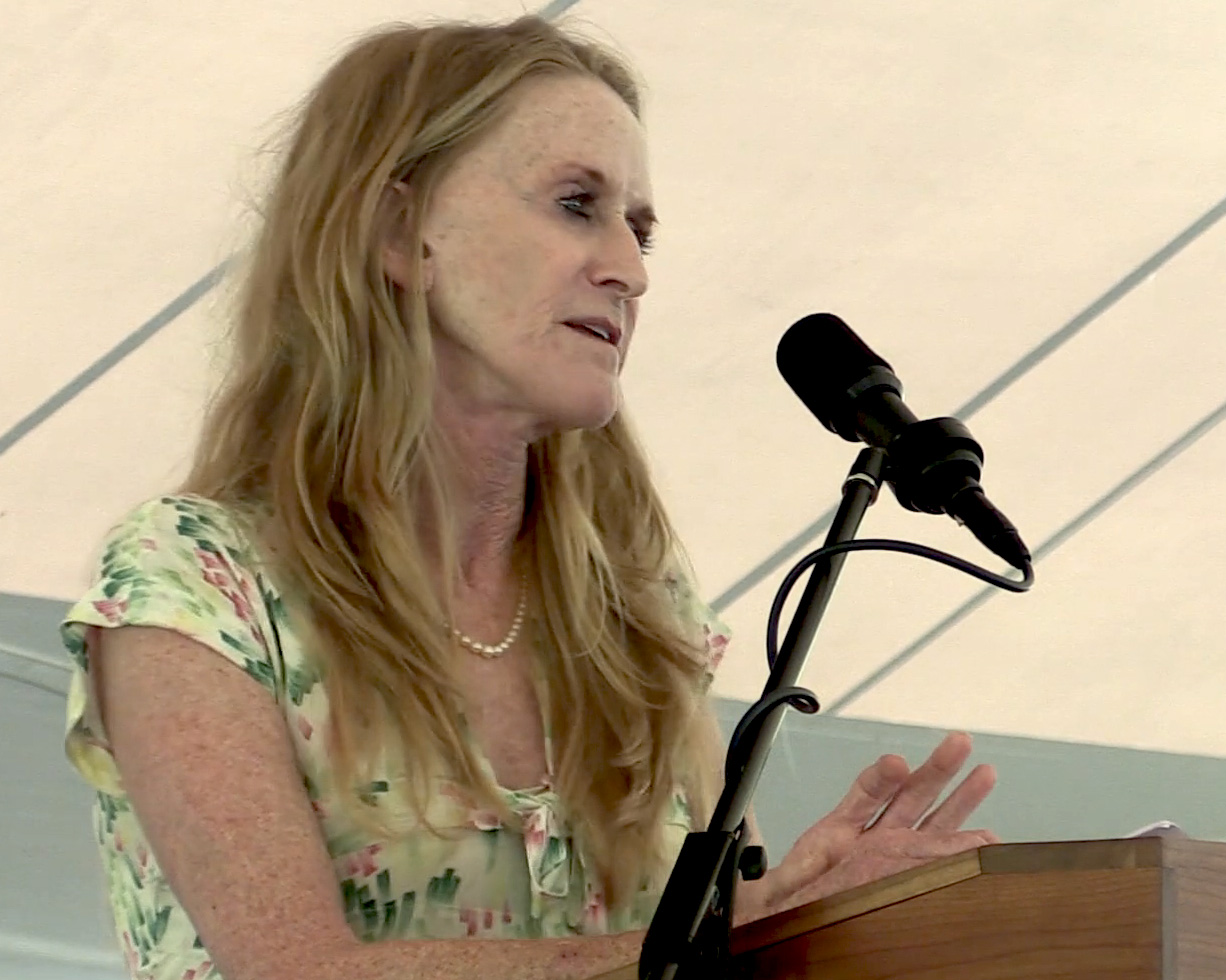
- McKenna in 2017
- Occupations: Journalist, critic, art curator

Kristine McKenna is an American journalist, critic and art curator best known for her interviews with artists, writers, thinkers, filmmakers and musicians. Many of these have been collected in Book of Changes (2001) and Talk to Her (2004). Among the people she has interviewed and written about most often over the years are Exene Cervenka, Leonard Cohen, David Lynch, Captain Beefheart, Brian Eno and Dan Hicks.

== Career ==
McKenna wrote for the Los Angeles Times from 1977 through 1998 and was one of the first mainstream journalists chronicling the early L.A. punk rock scene. She was Music Editor for influential avant-garde arts publication Wet and West Coast Editor of NME. Her profiles and criticism have appeared in Artforum, The New York Times, ARTnews, Vanity Fair, The Washington Post, Rolling Stone and many other publications. She was awarded a National Endowment for the Arts Administration grant (1976) and a Critics Fellowship from the National Gallery of Art (1991). She has contributed to many programs by radio artist Joe Frank.

McKenna co-curated the 1998 exhibition Forming: the Early Days of L.A. Punk, for Track 16 Gallery in Santa Monica. She was co-curator of Semina Culture: Wallace Berman & his Circle, a traveling group exhibition that opened at the Santa Monica Museum of Art in 2005. She is producer and co-writer of The Cool School, a documentary about L.A.'s first avant-garde gallery, and her book, The Ferus Gallery: A Place to Begin, was published by Steidl in 2009.

Her 2007 monograph on the photography of Wallace Berman, Wallace Berman Photographs, co-written with Lorraine Wild, was selected as one of the 50 best art books of the year by the AIGA. In 2009, she curated She: Work by Wallace Berman & Richard Prince, for the Michael Kohn Gallery in Los Angeles. In 2010 McKenna curated The Beautiful and the Damned, a show of photographs of L.A.'s early punk scene by Ann Summa. Her 2011 survey exhibition of photographer Charles Brittin was accompanied by the artist's monograph, Charles Brittin: West & South.

In 2010, she partnered with Donna Wingate and Lorraine Wild to launch the publishing imprint Foggy Notion Books.

In October 2015, it was announced that she was co-writing filmmaker David Lynch's "quasi-memoir" titled Life & Work. The book, retitled Room to Dream, was published in June 2018. She has participated in Lynch's "Festival of Disruption," doing onstage interviews with Lynch, Frank Gehry, Ed Ruscha, Sheryl Lee and others.

Musician Dan Hicks spent hours on the phone with McKenna every Friday for several years before his death in 2016, telling her his life story. She edited the conversations into Hicks' posthumous autobiography, I Scare Myself, published in 2017.

== Books ==
- Book of Changes, Seattle: Fantagraphics Books, 2001. ISBN 9781560974178
- Talk to Her, Seattle: Fantagraphics Books, 2004. ISBN 9781560975700
- Semina Culture: Wallace Berman & his Circle, written and edited with Michael Duncan, New York, New York: Distributed Art Publishers, Inc., 2005. ISBN 1933045108
- Wallace Berman Photographs, written and edited with Lorraine Wild, Santa Monica, CA, RoseGallery/Distributed Art Publishers, Inc., 2007. ISBN 1933045612
- She: Work by Wallace Berman & Richard Prince, Kohn Gallery/Distributed Art Publishers, Inc., 2009. ISBN 9781880086209
- The Ferus Gallery: A Place to Begin, Göttingen, Germany: Steidl, 2009. ISBN 9783865216106
- The Beautiful & the Damned: Photographs by Ann Summa, Los Angeles, California: Foggy Notion Books, 2010. ISBN 9781935202271
- Charles Brittin: West & South, Los Angeles, California: Foggy Notion Books, 2011. ISBN 9783775728362
- Richard Prince: Collected Writings, Los Angeles, California: Foggy Notion Books, 2011. ISBN 9780983587002
- Notes From a Revolution: Com/co, the Diggers & the Haight, edited with David Hollander, Los Angeles, California: Foggy Notion Books, 2012. ISBN 9780983587033
- Room to Dream, written with David Lynch, Random House, 2018. ISBN 9780399589195
