= Anders Persson =

Anders Persson (born 1953) is a Professor and the Director of the Center for Medical Image Science and Visualization at Linköping University, Sweden, and Linköping University Hospital. He was recruited by Linköping University in 2002 to start the center. In 2005 he received his Ph.D. from Linköping University in Medical Imaging. He received the Lennart Nilsson Award for scientific photography from the Karolinska Institute in 2008 "for the development of new imaging technologies and methods, which are extremely useful in health care and medical research".

In 2013 Persson received the Royal Photographic Society’s Combined Royal Colleges Medal, in collaboration with the Royal College of Physicians of London, the Royal College of Surgeons of England and the Royal College of Obstetricians and Gynaecologists. The Royal Colleges Medal is awarded for an outstanding contribution to the advancement of medical photography or the wider field of medical imaging.

== Awards ==
- Lennart Nilsson Award, Karolinska Institute, 2008.
- Royal Photographic Society’s Combined Royal Colleges Medal

== Selected publications ==
- Q&A: An insider's view of the body. Nature (2008).
- Random samples. Science (2008).
