= Edward Fella =

American graphic designer (born 1938)

- Born: 1938 (age 87–88); Detroit, Michigan, U.S.
- Education: Cass Technical High School; Center for Creative Studies; Cranbrook Academy of Art
- Occupations: Graphic designer; artist; educator
- Known for: Creating the OutWest typeface

Edward Fella (born 1938) is an American graphic designer, artist and educator. He created the OutWest typeface in 1993.

== Early life ==
Edward Fella was born in Detroit, MI in 1938 to a middle-class family and attended Cass Technical High School, a magnet school in Detroit where he studied lettering, illustration, paste-up and other commercial-art techniques. He graduated from Cass Tech in 1957 and went into the commercial graphic industry.

== Career and education ==
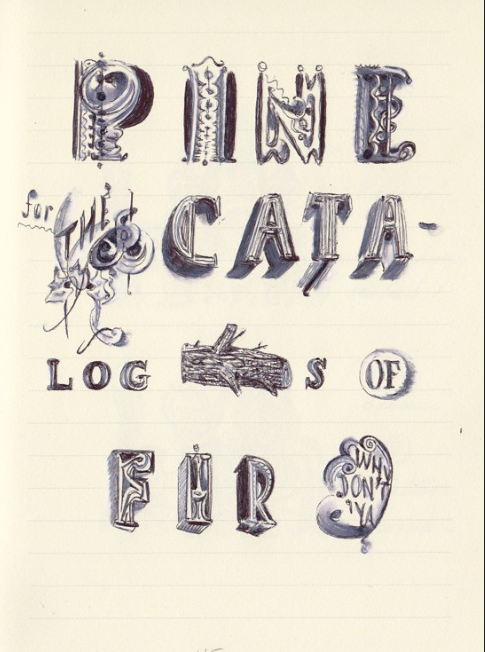

Edward Fella was a commercial artist for 30 years, from 1957 to 1987. Most of the works he created during this time were automotive and health care posters. Fella was given the name "the king of zing" because of his whimsical illustration style he had.

=== 1960s and 1970s ===
During the 1960s and 1970s Fella felt that his commercial work was not enough for him and he became very active in Detroit's cultural scene. He offered his services to some alternative art institutions and became the designer for the Detroit Focus gallery. There he created dozens of event posters and directed the Detroit Focus Quarterly. These clients gave Fella the opportunity to print and make public work similar to the experimental designs he had been creating in private. Fella used a positive photostat machine and made collages images and type that had been readily available. One of Fella's main creative outlet was his after the fact posters. These posters were made to give to those attending events, he made a small number of posters to give to people that attended the event instead of making a bunch of posters for only a small number of people to see beforehand. He made these posters for lectures and for appearances he made. In making posters for people attending the event he had more creative freedom; he did not have to appeal to a commercial audience. The posters helped him to expand his body of work.

=== 1980s and 1990s ===
In 1985 Fella retired from the commercial industry and decided to go back to school and enrolled in Cranbrook Academy of Art. After his time as a commercial artist he went to study at the Center for Creative Studies (now the College for Creative Studies), graduating in 1985. Subsequently, Fella went to Cranbrook Academy of Art, graduating in 1987. While at Cranbrook, Fella refined his craft, combining new creative experimentation with his 30 years of experience as a commercial artist. After graduating from Cranbrook, Fella was hired to teach at California institute of the Arts by Lorraine Wild in 1987.

=== 2000s ===
Fella gave his last lecture at CalArts on April 15, 2013. Because of this Fella gained a huge following by the time he was fifty and became a controversial new designer. Fella was given the title of "Graphic godfather" by Emigre magazine.

== Style ==
Edward Fella was known to break every rule in typography and design. He had a style that was unique to him at the time it was slightly based on the theory of deconstruction, but he took that and pushed it even further. He distorted a style of sans-serif with his own hand writing with various thicknesses, curves, and tails to each character so that each one is different from the one before. Fella is one of the most extreme example of a typographer who is able to achieve the same creative freedom as the painters and sculptors he promoted in catalogs and posters. When Fella started making hand-hewn typography, he mirrored earlier "words in freedom" produced by Dadaist, Surrealist, and Futurist. Fella has created two typefaces Outwest and Fella Parts. These typefaces show his eccentric and creative style with having a huge impact for being quirky and different. Outwest type looks like cactus wearing cowboy hats and Fella Parts looks like a mix of comic sans and dingbat fonts. He distributes these font through Emigre fonts and even thought these fonts are crazy and over the top they were still adapted to mainstream designs.

According to this article, his first job after finishing high school was an apprenticeship at Phoenix Studios, a commercial art space. His day-to-day work during his time as a commercial artist was drawing headlines and layouts which helped refine his style and skill. His illustrations were reflective of the trends of the time, while the typography he used was ironic to commercial art deco type. Fella explored many different techniques, such as found typography, scribbles, brush writing, typesetting, rubdown letters, public domain clip art, stencils and more. Later studying at Cranbrook, Fella had the freedom to continue and concentrate on his artistic exploration and experimental designs. Fella's work developed into an elaborate pseudo-anarchic designs very different from anything being made at the time. His designs impacted and influenced a new era of designers who wanted to make a claim to the design world.

== Historical influence ==
Throughout his career, Fella has helped and influenced designers with his designs. He started helping designers when he would visit Cranbrook as a guest critic before he became a student and continued even after he became a student. Fella made many sketch books and collages that helped inspire many Cranbook students to break the barriers of visual design like Fella did. Fella influenced Jeffery Keedy. Keedy made a typeface called keedysans and has similarity's to Fella's style with inconsistent spacing and the characters were rounded and sometimes sliced. After graduating, he joined Cal Arts, where he taught design and helped influence the new generation of designers. Barry Deck, a graduate from Cal Arts, creator of the iconic typeface template gothic, which was influenced by Fella; Deck even says that he made it intentionally imperfect to show the imperfect language of an imperfect world. Decks typeface became one of the most important typefaces of the decade.

== Awards and collections ==
His work is held in the collection of the Cooper-Hewitt, National Design Museum, the Brauer Museum of Art, and the Museum of Modern Art. He was the recipient of the 2007 AIGA Medal. He was also the recipient of a Chrysler Award in 1997. Curt Cloninger called Fella "the contemporary master of hand-drawn typography."

== See also ==
- List of graphic designers
