= Beyond Shariati =

2017 book by Siavash Saffari

Beyond Shariati: Modernity, Cosmopolitanism, and Islam in Iranian Political Thought
- First edition
- Author: Siavash Saffari
- Language: English
- Subject: Ali Shariati's thought
- Publisher: Cambridge University Press
- Publication date: 2017
- Media type: Print
- Pages: 213 pp.
- ISBN: 9781316686966

Beyond Shariati: Modernity, Cosmopolitanism, and Islam in Iranian Political Thought is a 2017 book by Siavash Saffari in which the author examines Ali Shariati's intellectual legacy. The book which is based on Saffari's doctoral dissertation at the University of Alberta, was awarded the American Political Science Association’s First Book Award in 2018.

== Reception ==
The book has been reviewed by Abdulaziz Sachedina, Hamid Dabashi, Fred Dallmayr, Parmida Esmaeilpour, Arash Davari, Catherine Sameh, Seyed Mohammad Ali Taghavi, Adis Duderija and Mojtaba Mahdavi.

== See also ==
- Ali Shariati
- Post-Islamism
- Islamic socialism
- Criticism of Islamism
