= Martin Oeggerli =

Swiss photographer (born 1974)

Martin Oeggerli (born 7 March 1974), known professionally as Micronaut, is a Swiss photographer specializing in scientific microscopy and fine art.

== Biography ==
Oeggerli studied biology at the University of Basel from 1994 to 2000 and obtained his diploma in 2002 under David G. Senn. In 2005, he obtained his PhD in molecular pathology under Guido Sauter at the University of Basel. Since 2006, he has been working in the research department of the University Hospital of Basel as part of a project funded by the Swiss National Science Foundation and is also a consultant to a laboratory specializing in scanning electron microscopy (PTU GmbH).

== Awards ==
- 2006: Bilder der Forschung - 3rd prize
- 2008: Bilder der Forschung - 1st and 2nd prize
- 2008: The EMBO Journal Best Scientific Cover Image - 1st prize
- 2009: Bilder der Forschung - 3rd prize
- 2009: Bild der Wissenschaft German Prize for Scientific Photography - 1st prize
- 2010: International Photography Awards - 2nd prize category 'Special: Micro'
- 2010: The EMBO Journal Best Scientific Cover Image - 1st prize
- 2011: Bild der Wissenschaft German Prize for Scientific Photography - 1st prize
- 2011: International Photography Awards - 1st and 2nd prize category 'Special: Micro'
- 2022: Lennart Nilsson Award

== See also ==
- Scanning electron microscopy
