= Felice Frankel =

American scientific photographer

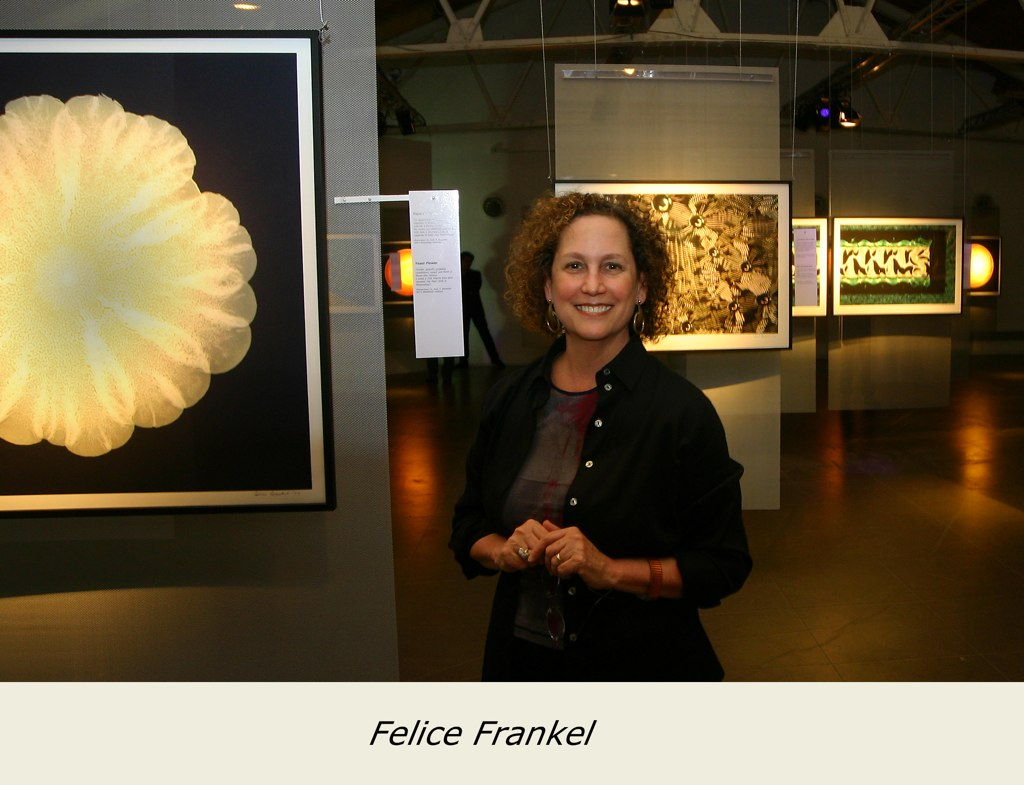
- Frankel in 2004
- Born: Brooklyn, New York, US
- Education: Brooklyn College, City University of New York (CUNY)
- Known for: Photographs of scientific and engineering subjects
- Awards: Fellow of AAAS; Guggenheim Fellow; Lennart Nilsson Award
- Scientific career
- Fields: Science and engineering photography
- Workplaces: Massachusetts Institute of Technology; Harvard University

Felice Frankel is an American researcher and photographer of scientific images. She has received multiple awards, both for the aesthetic quality of her science photographs and for her ability to effectively communicate complicated scientific information in images.

== Early life and education ==
Born in Brooklyn, Felice Frankel attended Midwood High School and then Brooklyn College of the City University of New York (CUNY), where she majored in biology. She became an architectural photographer.

== Career redirection ==
In 1991–1992, she was awarded a Loeb Fellowship at the Harvard Graduate School of Design. Unlike many of her visual design colleagues, she decided to return to her scientific roots, auditing a class in chemistry taught by professor George M. Whitesides. Working with one of his postdocs, Nick Abbott, they collaboratively produced a striking image that was selected for the cover of the professional journal Science. Impressed with her work, Whitesides advised her, "Stay with this, Felice, you are doing something that no one else is doing."

This launched her into a new career working in alternation at Harvard and the Massachusetts Institute of Technology (MIT), as funding and interesting work became available. As of 2025, she has spent more time at MIT, working at a number of departments and labs. She has observed, "That's the thing about MIT. If you have something to offer, even without formal credentials (I don't have a graduate degree), MIT will support you."

== Career ==
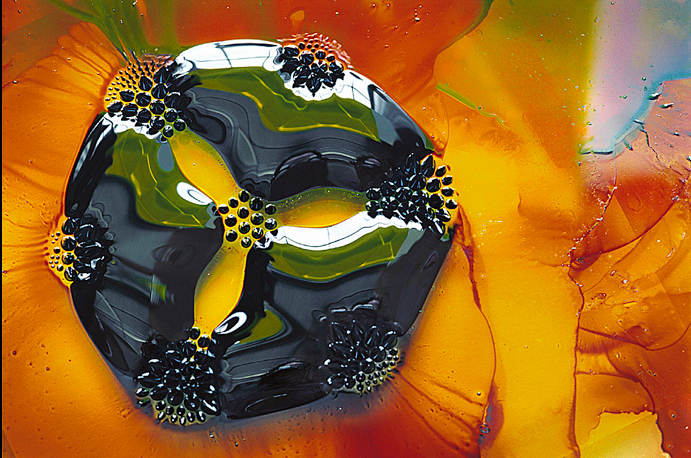
Frankel's photo of ferrofluid (2002)

External videos
- No Small Matter, Felice Frankel, PRI, Studio 360 video, September 9, 2010
- More than Pretty Pictures Felice Frankel, PRI, TEDx Boston video, October 13, 2010
- Reimagining Nanotechnology, Felice Frankel, PBS NewsHour video, March 9, 2010
- How to communicate science visually, Felice Frankel, MIT News video, October 26, 2012

Felice Frankel joined MIT in 1994. As of 2025, she is a research scientist in the Department of Chemical Engineering at MIT with support from Mechanical Engineering. She has also been a senior research fellow in the Harvard Initiative in Innovative Computing from 2005-2009, and a visiting scholar at the Harvard Medical School Department of Systems Biology.

Her most recent books are her "Handbooks for Communicating Science and Engineering", starting with The Visual Elements—Photography in 2023. Frankel was interviewed by The Chemical Engineer about her new guide to help engineers in 2024. The Visual Elements—Design was published in March, 2024. The third Element, The Visual Elements—Abstraction, was published in August, 2026. Her 2018 book, Picturing Science and Engineering is based on her MIT OpenCourseWare course.

Working in collaboration with scientists and engineers, Frankel's images have been published in a number of professional journal articles, magazine covers, and various other international publications for general audiences such as National Geographic, Nature, Science, Angewandte Chemie, Advanced Materials, Materials Today, Proceedings of the National Academy of Sciences, Newsweek, Scientific American, Discover Magazine, and New Scientist, among others. In 2003–2007 she contributed a series of columns, "Sightings", in American Scientist addressing the power of imaging science.

Frankel and her work have been profiled in The New York Times, Wired, Life Magazine, The Boston Globe, The Washington Post, The Chronicle of Higher Education, National Public Radio's All Things Considered, Science Friday, The Christian Science Monitor, and various European publications. Her limited-edition photographs are included in a number of corporate and private collections, and were part of MOMA’s 2008 exhibition, Design and the Elastic Mind. Her work was featured in the 2016 MIT Museum exhibition Images of Discovery: Communicating Science through Photography.

Frankel founded the "Image and Meaning" workshops and conferences to develop new approaches for promoting the public understanding of science through visual expression. She also was principal investigator of the National Science Foundation-funded program "Picturing to Learn", an effort to study how making representations aids students in teaching and learning.

== Image integrity ==
Frankel is a strong advocate of image integrity for scientific and documentary photographic images. She encourages researches to question various image adjustment and enhancement techniques such as color enhancement, grayscale inversion, or selective deletion of distracting or irrelevant elements, as well as more subtle manipulations of image histograms, all in service of goals such as clarity of communication.

Ultimately, the decision must not change the data. She insists that all image manipulation must be fully disclosed, to avoid misleading the reader regarding the integrity of the scientific images. In her 2018 book, Frankel has reprinted the journal publication guidelines of Nature, Science, and Cell, comparing the extensively detailed directives of the first journal with the minimal guidance given in the latter two publications as of her book's publication deadline.

== Awards and honors ==
- Fellow of the American Association for the Advancement of Science
- Guggenheim Fellow
- 2010 – Distinguished Alumna, Brooklyn College, CUNY
- The Loeb Fellowship at Harvard University Graduate School of Design
- Chancellor's Distinguished Visiting Fellow in the Arts and Sciences at the University of California, Irvine
- 2009 – Progress Medal of the Photographic Society of America, PSA's highest award
- 2007 – Lennart Nilsson Award for Scientific Photography: "Those viewing Ms. Frankel's images are initially captivated by their form and colour. No sooner is their curiosity aroused than they want to know what the photograph depicts. She has thus fulfilled a scientific reporter's paramount task: to awaken people's interest and desire to learn."

== Books ==
- Frankel, Felice (2026). The Visual Elements ― Abstraction: A Handbook for Communicating Science and Engineering. Chicago: University of Chicago Press. ISBN 978-0-226-84828-0.
- Frankel, Felice (2025). Phenomenal Moments: Revealing the Hidden Science Around Us. Cambridge, Massachusetts: MITeen Press. ISBN 978-1-5362-3489-3.
- Frankel, Felice (2024). The Visual Elements ― Design: A Handbook for Communicating Science and Engineering. Chicago: University of Chicago Press. ISBN 978-0-226-82916-6.
- Frankel, Felice (2023). The Visual Elements — Photography: A Handbook for Communicating Science and Engineering. Chicago London: The University of Chicago Press. ISBN 978-0226827025.
- Frankel, Felice (2018). Picturing science and engineering. Cambridge, MA: The MIT Press. ISBN 978-0262038553.
- Frankel, Felice; DePace, Angela H. (2012). Visual strategies: a practical guide to graphics for scientists & engineers. New Haven [Conn.]; London: Yale University Press. ISBN 978-0300176445.
- Frankel, Felice; Whitesides, George M. (2009). No small matter: science on the nanoscale. Cambridge, Mass. London: Harvard University Press. ISBN 978-0674035669.
- Frankel, Felice; Whitesides, George M. (2007). On the surface of things: images of the extraordinary in science. Cambridge: Harvard University Press. ISBN 978-0674026889.
- Frankel, Felice (2002). Envisioning science: the design and craft of the science image. Cambridge, Mass.: MIT Press. ISBN 978-0262562058.
- Johnson, Jory; Frankel, Felice (1991). Modern landscape architecture: redefining the garden (1st ed.). New York: Abbeville Press. ISBN 978-1558590236.

== See also ==
- List of photographers
- Jacqueline Casey
- Muriel Cooper
- Edward Tufte
