= Ronald Kapaz =

Brazilian designer and brand strategist

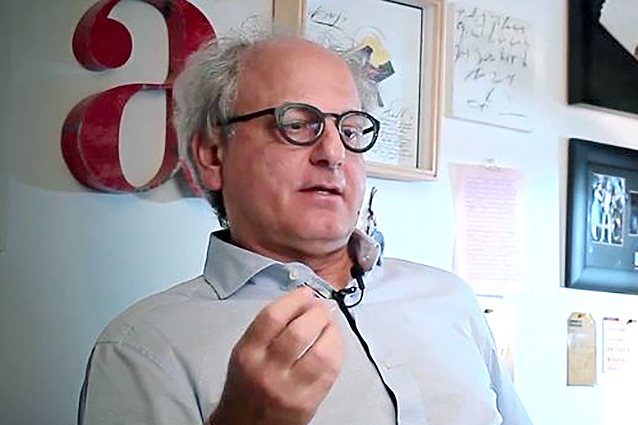
- Ronald in 2016
- Born: November 16, 1956 (age 69); São Paulo, Brazil
- Education: Universidade de São Paulo
- Occupations: Designer; Brand strategist
- Years active: 1979–present
- Children: 2

Ronald Kapaz (born November 16, 1956) is a Brazilian graphic designer and brand strategy consultant.

== Life ==
Born in São Paulo on November 16, 1956, he has been actively working since 1979, and is recognized as one of the pioneers in graphic design, strategic thinking and branding as inseparable parts of the construction and expression of brands in Brazil.

Graduated in architecture from FAU/USP in 1979, he founded, together with André Poppovic and Giovanni Vannucchi, Oz Strategy+Design, which had a widely recognized role in the innovation, leadership and the creation of a unique Brazilian design culture. The company received several national and international awards throughout its 40 years of existence.

He was responsible, along with other professional colleagues, for the creation of the ADG (Association of Graphic Designers), having been director in some administrations, and of Abedesign, an entity that represents and promotes Brazilian design companies in Brazil and abroad.

He was a member of the CNIC - National Council for the Incentive to Culture of the Ministry of Culture as a full councilor for the area of visual arts between 2000 and 2006, in the evaluation of projects to be benefited by Law nº 8.313/91 (Law Federal Cultural Incentive - Rouanet Law).

He participates as a speaker and / or judge of several awards related to the subject of design, both nationally and internationally. He was a judge for the iF Design Award, one of the most renowned design awards in the world, at its 2014 edition in Hanover, Germany.

In 2019, together with Suzana Ivamoto, he founded Playground Lab Design, a strategic consulting company that designs brand transition processes.

== Works ==
- International Jury for The Nods, the Creativity Award, Scotland. 2018/2019/2020.
- Invited speaker for the international symposium AlmaBrands, Santiago, Chile. October 2018.
- Invited member to integrate the Advisory Board of Instituto Santo Tomás de Ensino, Santiago, Chile. August 2016
- He was a member of the Board of Notables of the Panamericana School of Arts and Design, São Paulo. From 2006 to 2016.
- Guest speaker for the Imagine 12 Seminar. Tallinn, Estonia. October 2015.
- Appointed Ambassador of Latin Design by UP-University Palermo, Argentina, and invited to join the body of Latin American Ambassadors – May 2015.
- Guest speaker for the celebration of the International Design Day, promoted by ico-D, giving lectures at the headquarters of DUOC - Catholic University of Chile - May 2015.
- Guest speaker at the Festival El Sol de Comunicação 2015, Bilbao, Spain – May/June 2015
- Guest speaker for the Marketers Congress, international event - Montevideo, Uruguay, 2012 and 2017.
- Studies philosophy and literature, aiming to deepen the humanist perspective, and (re)establish the bridge between aesthetics and ethics
- International Jury in the contest “The Universal Logo for Human Rights“, at the invitation of the Government of Germany, represented by its Consulate in São Paulo - Germany, September 2011.
- Participated, as ADG delegate, in the ICOGRADA International Conferences in 1997 - Montevideo, 1999 - Sydney, 2001 - Johannesburg, 2005 - São Paulo and 2010 - Vancouver.
- Guest speaker for the Design Currency Congress, at the international event - Vancouver Design Week, in Vancouver, Canada, organized by GDC and ICOGRADA, April 2010.
- Author of several articles on Strategy and Design published in national and international specialized magazines (Diseño Latino-América 2008, Icograda, Pequin Design School, among others).
- Professor at Fundação Getúlio Vargas - FGVPEC, the main business school in Brazil, in the postgraduate course in Branding - Brand Building between 2008 and 2018.
- Taught, as a guest professor, in the Branding MBA at Faculdades Integradas Rio Branco, 2007.
- Participated in the advisory board of Fundação Abrinq between 1990 and 2000.
- Works as an advisory board member at Instituto Jatobás since 2017.

== Selection of Awards and Recognitions ==
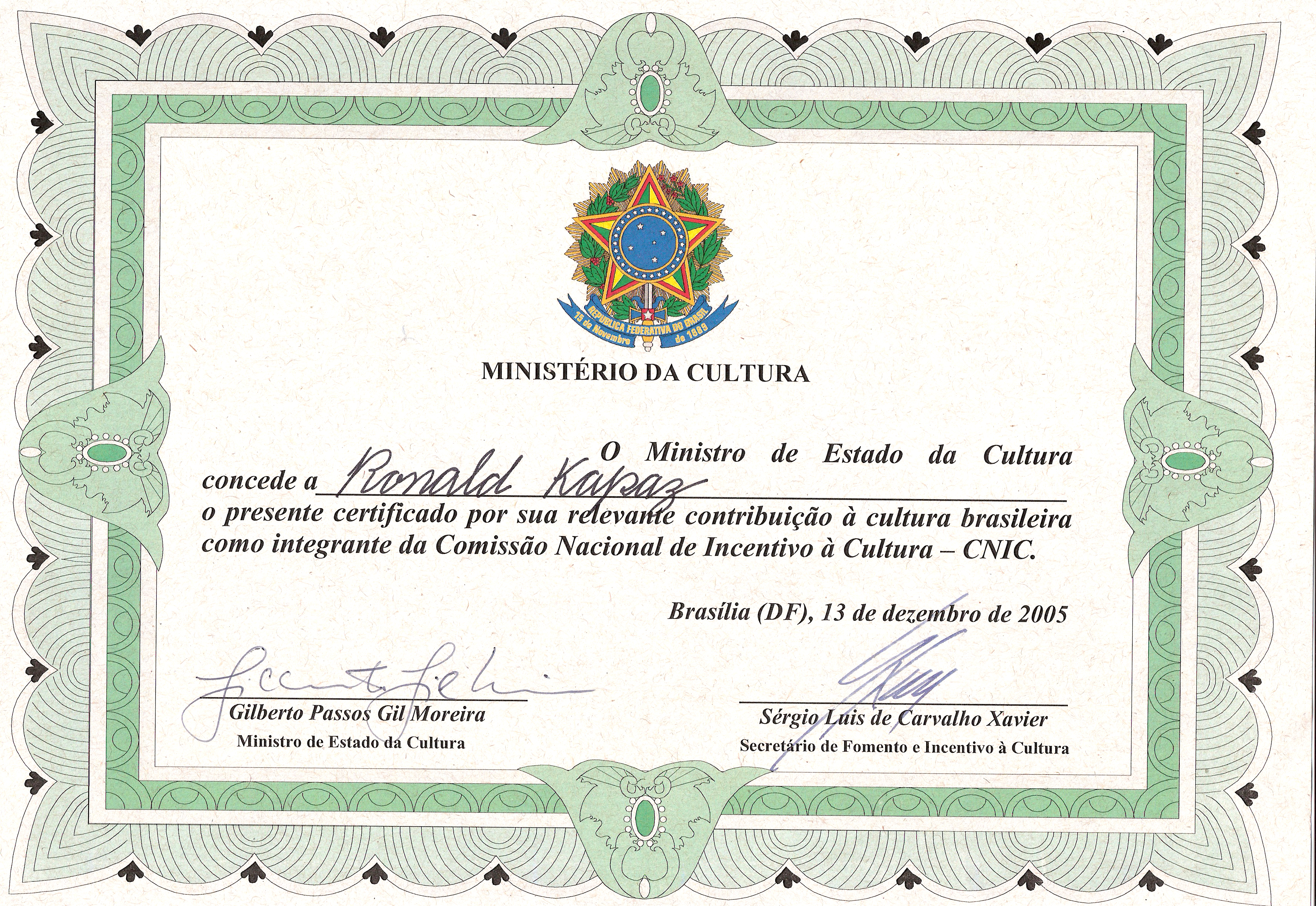
Certificate of relevance to Brazilian culture granted by the CNIC to Ronald Kapaz and signed by Gilberto Gil in 2005

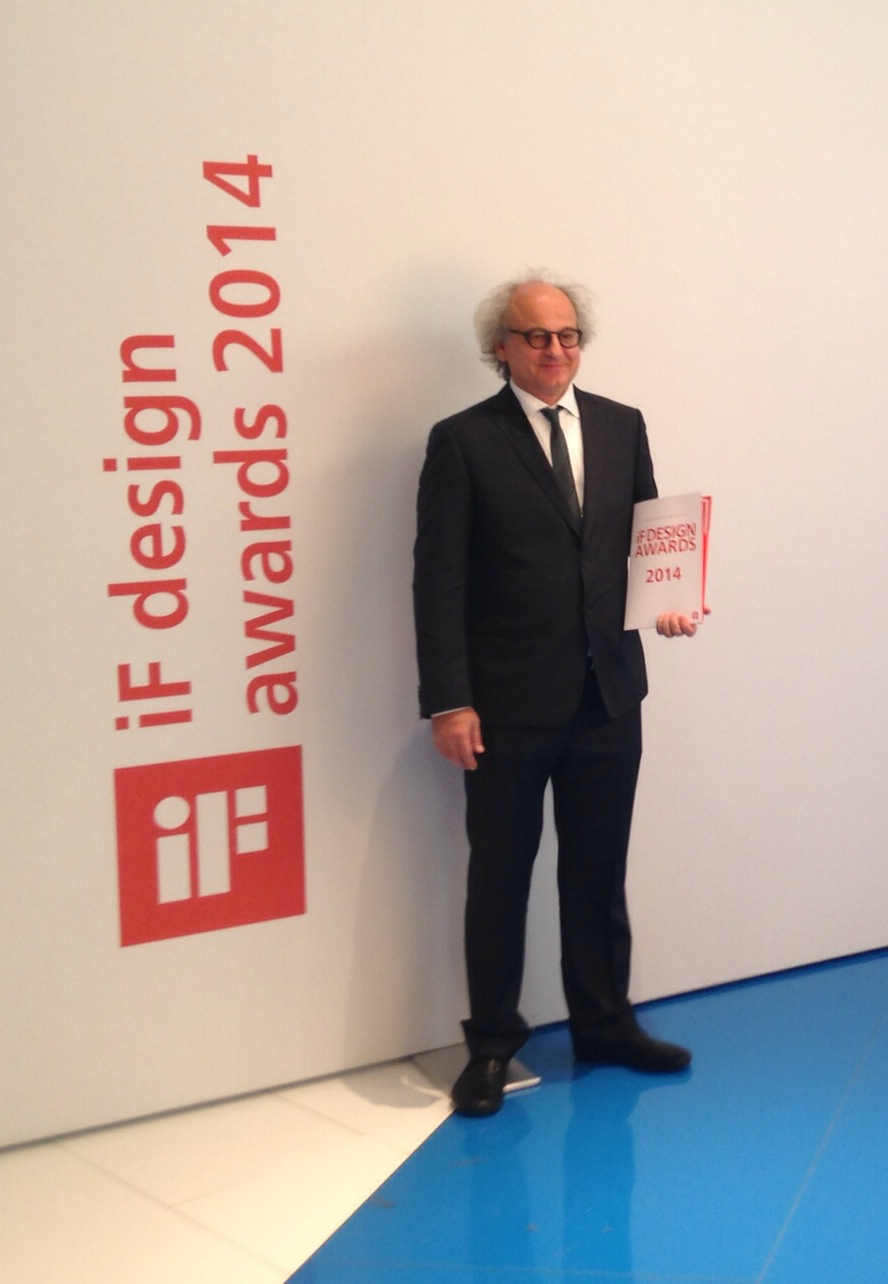
Ronald Kapaz at the iF Design Award 2014 Hanover, Germany.

IF COMMUNICATION DESIGN AWARDS

- 2020 Branding - Athletico Paranaense
- 2015 Alana Institute | School Creatives - Visual Identity
- 2012 Penalty | Ginga typography
- 2012 Penalty Rebrand | Brand Identity
- 2007 Native Spa Line | O Boticário

BDA AWARD

- 2019 BRONZE | Branding | Athletico Paranaense
- 2018 SILVER | Ambience - Signaling System | SENAC
- 2018 SILVER | Setting Up Corporate Spaces | Porto Seguro
- 2018 SILVER | Lello Lab - Impact Design, Service Design | Lello
- 2018 SILVER | Packaging Design | Tônica Prata
- 2018 GOLD | Structural Design | Tônica Prata
- 2018 BRONZE | Impact Design, Graphic Design | Believe Earth
- 2018 BRONZE | Corporate Publications | Pinheiro Neto
- 2018 BRONZE | retail chain design | Natura
- 2018 BRONZE | Brand Design | ICON
- 2018 BRONZE | Brand Design | Hering Kids
- 2018 BRONZE | Brand Design | Editora MOL
- 2012 Penalty | Ginga typography

RED DOT

- 2019 GOLD | Branding - Athletico Paranaense - Communication (Brands & Communication Design)

WOLDA

- 2019 Bronze | Identity - Athletico Paranaense

CANNES LIONS

- 2013 Finalist (shortlist) | Branding Oz Strategy + Design
