= Jacqueline Casey =

American graphic designer (1927–1992)

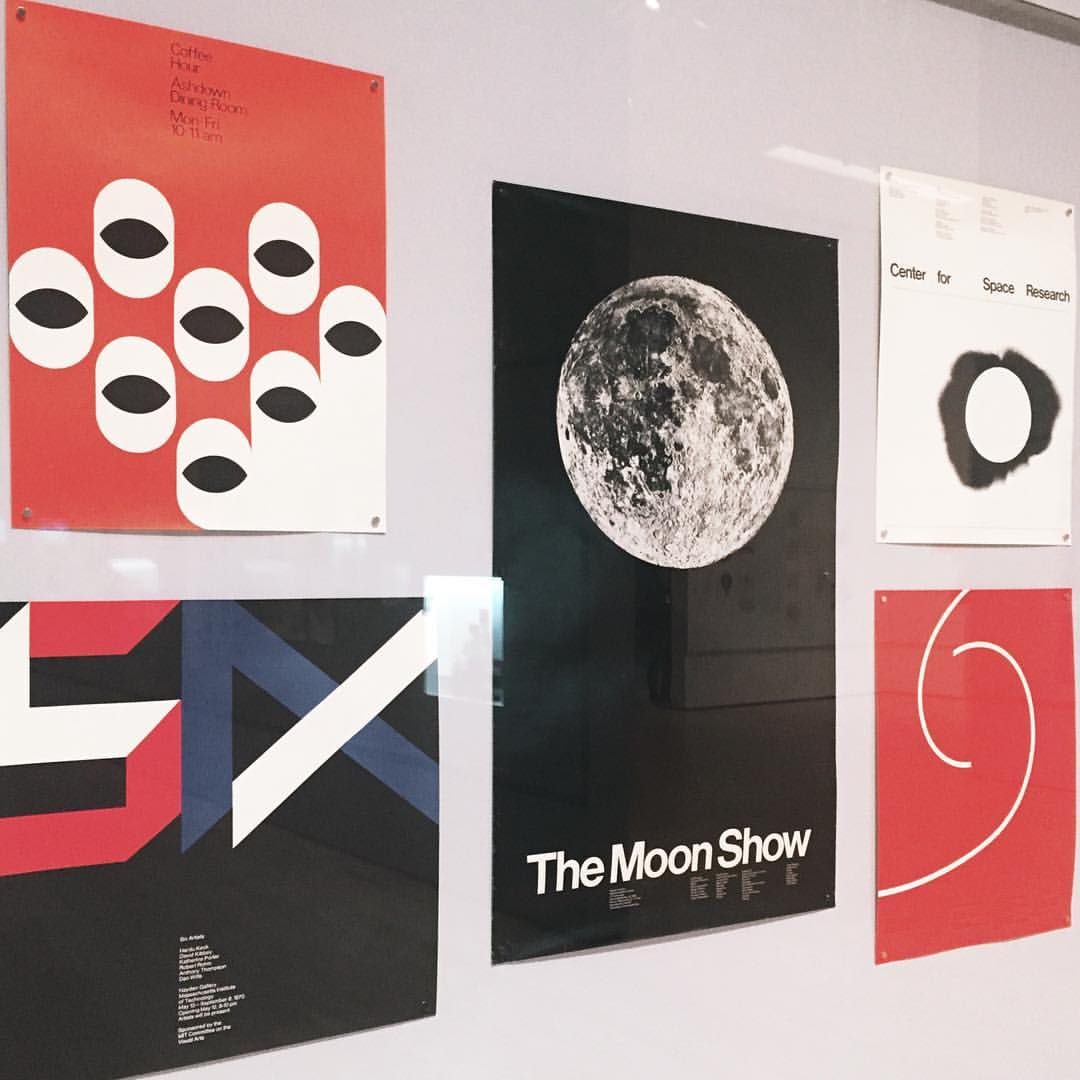
- Typical posters by Jacqueline Casey
- Born: Jacqueline Shepard; April 20, 1927; Quincy, Massachusetts, US
- Died: May 18, 1992 (aged 65); Brookline, Massachusetts, US
- Education: Massachusetts College of Art (BFA, 1949)
- Known for: Graphic design, fashion illustration, interior design
- Movement: Modernist
- Patrons: Massachusetts Institute of Technology

Jacqueline S. Casey (20 April 1927 – 18 May 1992) was a graphic designer best known for the posters and other graphic art she created for the Massachusetts Institute of Technology (MIT). While practicing a functional Modernism, Jacqueline S. Casey was a graphic designer in the Office of Publications (later retitled the Office of Design Services) from 1955 to 1989, and was appointed director in 1972. In discussing her design, Casey stated, "My work combines two cultures: The American interest in visual metaphor on the one hand, and the Swiss fascination with planning, fastidiousness, and control over technical execution on the other."

== Early life and education ==
Casey was born Jacqueline Shepard in 1927 in Quincy, Massachusetts, the only child of a working-class couple.

She studied for a Bachelor of Fine Arts degree in fashion design and illustration at the Massachusetts College of Art (MassArt), graduating in 1949. After graduating, she had a number of jobs, including work in interior design and advertising, however she never obtained a job she was completely interested in; she stated, "I broke the negative cycle by traveling through Europe for three months" and came back "with the decision to focus my life on something related to the arts... to develop my visual sensitivity."

== MIT ==
The professional quality and creative additions to design are what made the MIT's campus design group widely respected in the field. MIT is acknowledged as the first American college to employ graphic designers as part of the faculty, and Jacqueline Casey was one of the few who were hired. The prototype for the university's publisher (MIT Press) was implemented by the graphic designers, who became known for the meticulous and straightforward style of their typography. Campus projects, programs, cultural, and scientific events were advertised on campus, locally, and to the world at large through the group designer's works.

In 1955, Jacqueline Shepard was recruited by fellow MassArt alumna Muriel Cooper to work at the Office of Publications at MIT. She later stated, “In my early days at MIT, a designer working on summer materials would interview faculty and have a mini-course in a subject such as radioisotopes from the professor in charge. There was an opportunity to learn something new every day.”

In 1972, Casey became Director, taking over this position as her colleague joined the MIT faculty. The two women were among the few working at this professional level at MIT of the time. During her tenure as Director, Casey became known for designing distinctive publicity posters for MIT events, working alongside Ralph Coburn and Dietmar Winkler. Casey's designs were influenced by the International Typographic Style recently developed in Switzerland, particularly designers such as Karl Gerstner, Armin Hofmann, and Josef Müller-Brockmann.

Casey's posters generally consisted of a striking image or bold typography, accompanied by informational details in smaller text. She often used typographic wordplay and visual puns in her work. Speaking of her designs in 1988, she said: "My job is to stop anyone I can with an arresting or puzzling image, and entice the viewer to read the message in small type and above all to attend the exhibition."

As well as being used for promotion of on-campus events and in MIT publications, Casey's work was exhibited at MIT, the Chelsea School of Art in London, and the London College of Printing.

== Personal life ==
In 1958, Jacqueline Shepard married William "Bill" Casey, and changed her name to Jacqueline S Casey. Her spouse was a psychologist doing social work from a home office in their art-filled home in Brookline, Massachusetts. In 1975, he died of cancer.

Jacqueline Casey herself was diagnosed with cancer in 1982, and struggled to handle the workload at MIT with assistance of her staff. In 1989 she was forced to retire, but her longtime colleague, neighbor, and friend Muriel Cooper arranged for her to continue work as a visiting scholar at the MIT Media Laboratory. Casey died of cancer on May 18, 1992.

== Legacy ==
Casey's work is held in the permanent collections of the MIT Museum, Library of Congress, the Museum of Modern Art in New York, and the Cooper-Hewitt Museum.

The MIT Museum mounted exhibitions of Casey's graphic work in 1992, 2012, and 2018. Her complete works for MIT are archived in the collection of the MIT Museum. In addition to the MIT holdings, the Rochester Institute of Technology has a collection of 99 posters, donated by the MIT Museum at the designer's request. Selected examples of these posters may be viewed online.

== Works and exhibitions ==
=== Massachusetts Institute of Technology ===
- Give Blood. 1983.
- Arts on the Line. 1980.
- Poster for Coffee Hour. 1979.
- Ger Dekkers (New Dutch Landscape) Exhibition Poster. 1979.
- Mediums of Language. 1977.
- Art and Environment. Poster for MIT’s Center for Advanced Visual Studies, 1972.
- Poster for Octave of Prayer. 1972.
- Goya: The Disasters of War. 1971.
- Six Artists Exhibition Poster. 1970.
- Poster for Open House. 1969.
- Poster for The Moon Show. 1969.
- Poster for Center for Space Research. 1968.
- Light 7 Exhibition Poster. 1968.
- Miscellaneous Motions of Kinetic Sculpture. 1967.
- Poster for Boston Visual Arts Union. Hayden Gallery.
- Poster for MIT Gospel Choir: God Is...
- Poster for MIT Gospel Choir: There Is NoGreaterLove.
- LincolnLab Recruitment Poster.
- Walking in the Spirit: A Celebration of Gospel Music.

=== North Carolina State University ===
- Furniture by Architects Exhibition Poster. 1981.
- Two Views/Peter Berg, Two Sculptures/Ed Rothfarb. 1979.
- MIT Symphony Orchestra Tour 1973. 1973.
- Medicine of the Future. 1971.
- Monuments to Malcolm X Poster. 1970.
- Stop Oil Pollution. 1970.
- Library Booklet Cover. 1967.
- Ocean Engineering Recruitment Poster. 1967.
- Humanities Series Concerts. 1966.
- Corners Exhibition Poster.
- Presidents' Ball Poster.
- Technology and Policy Program at MIT.

=== Rochester Institute of Technology ===
- Jacqueline Casey. 1990.
- Academic Honesty: Are Our Standards Clear?. 1984.
- Elijah: Felix Mendelssohn. 1984.
- James Turrell: An Installation. Wallace Library. 1983.
- Constructed Color: Sculpture by James Biederman, James Hoberman, Steve Keister, Lizbeth Marano, George Mayocole. Wallace Library. 1982.
- Great Big Drawings. Wallace Library. 1982.
- Intimate Architecture: Contemporary Clothing Design. Wallace Library. 1982.
- 4 Painters. Wallace Library. 1981.
- Body Language. Wallace Library. 1981.
- The Computer: From Counting To Cognition. 1979.
- Chemistry at MIT. 1978.
- Cancer: Symposium on the Occasion of the Dedication of the Seeley G. Mudd Building. 1975.
- Brassai, The Eye of Paris: An Exhibition of Photographs. 1974.
- Fredrich St. Florian Projects. Wallace Library. 1973.
- A Spring Festival of Music 1972 in Honor of Klaus Liepmann. 1972.
- Poster for Faculty-Student Exchange Program. 1972.
- Lift Equilibrium: An Outdoor Experiment. 1969.
- Hans Haacke Exhibition Poster. Wallace Library. 1967.
- Aesthetics of Progress.
- Helène Aylon.
- Seven Montreal Painters.

=== Other ===
- Casey, Jacqueline S. & Small, David. Fives. Visible Language Workshop, October 1990.
- Russia, USA Peace. 1985.
- Judge at Creativity on Paper exhibition. Sponsored by Art Direction magazine, 1966.

== Awards and honors ==
Casey has received numerous awards and honors for her work, including:

- William J. Gunn Award, Creative Club of Boston. 1988.
- Honorary doctorate of fine arts, Massachusetts College of Art. 1990.
- Appointed by the late President Bartlett A. Giamatti of Yale University to the Visiting Committee of the Yale School of Graphic Design.
- Member of the Alliance Graphique Internationale and of the American Institute of Graphic Arts.

== See also ==
- Felice Frankel
