= Denise Gonzales Crisp =

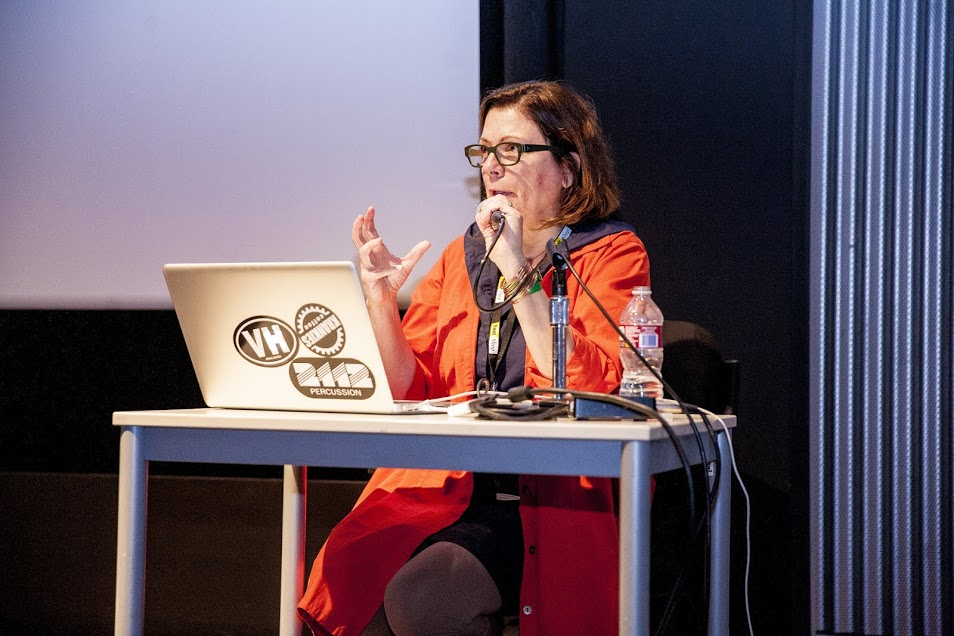
Denise Gonzales Crisp at the Typo San Francisco conference in 2014.

Denise Gonzales Crisp is a graphic designer, writer, and professor of graphic design at North Carolina State University College of Design (since 2002), where she currently directs the graduate program. She holds a M.F.A. in graphic design from the California Institute of the Arts and a B.F.A. from Art Center College of Design.

She is author of Graphic Design in Context: Typography. She has been invited to speak at numerous conferences, universities, and events—at TYPO Talks, ATypI 2009 (Mexico City), the Walker Art Center (Minneapolis), GraficEurope (Berlin), RMIT (Melbourne), ArtCity (Calgary), among others. She has exhibited her work both nationally and internationally, is published widely in design journals: Emigre, Metropolis, Print, Graphis, Eye, Items, and KAK.

Gonzales Crisp was senior designer for the Art Center College of Design in Pasadena and principal of SuperStoove!, a design studio focussed on designing "books for the cultural sector". She designed Utopian Entrepreneur by Brenda Laurel, part of the Mediawork pamphlet series for MIT Press, edited by Peter Lunenfeld on "the intersections of art, design, technology, and market culture."

Gonzales Crisp has taught graphic design at Art Center College of Design, CalArts, and Otis Art Institute. She sits on the Executive Board of DesignInquiry, a non-profit educational organization devoted to researching design issues in intensive team-based gatherings, with (co-founder) Margo Halverson, (co-founder) Peter Hall, Emily Luce, Anita Cooney, Gabrielle Esperdy, Gail Swanlund, Joshua Singer, and Ben Van Dyke.
