= James Victore =

American graphic designer and author (born 1962)

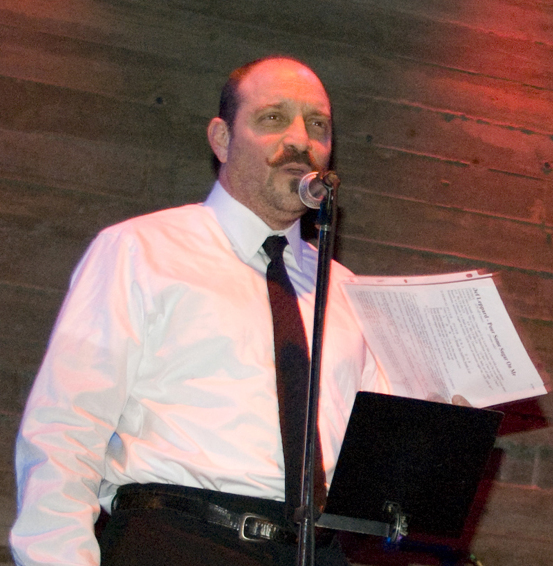
- Victore in 2010
- Born: 1962 (age 63–64)
- Education: The School of Visual Arts, New York City
- Known for: Graphic Design, Fine Art
- Notable work: Victore, or Who Died and Made You Boss? Abrams (2010)
- Website: jamesvictore.com

James Victore (born 1962) is an American artist, art director, graphic designer, and author. He is best known for his direct political posters that use hand-painted lettering and loose handwriting. Victore has taught at SVA in New York and has written a number of books on graphic design.

== Biography ==
Victore was born in 1962 and grew up on an air force base in Plattsburgh, New York in a family of a career airman and a college librarian. He studied at Plattsburgh State College for one year before dropping out and moving to New York City to attend SVA. Victore did not graduate from SVA either, and considers himself self-taught. His early jobs included designing restaurant menus, greeting cards, CD and book covers. He apprenticed for book cover designer Paul Bacon.

In 1992, Victore joined graphic designers John Gall, Leah Lococo, Morris Taub, Susan Walsh, and Steven Brower to form a design group under the name "Post No Bills" to produce political posters ahead of the 1992 Presidential election. In 1993, in response to race riots in Crown Heights, Brooklyn, Victore created a poster titled "Racism" that became one of his most famous works and was acquired by the New York Museum of Modern Art and Denver Art Museum.

As of 2025, Victore lives in Texas, outside of Austin.

== Collections ==
Victore's posters are held in permanent collections of several museums.

- Museum of Modern Art, New York, NY
- Palais du Louvre, Paris, France
- Library of Congress, Washington, DC
- Museum fur Gestaltung, Zurich
- Stedelijk Museum, Amsterdam

== Bibliography ==
- Victore, James; Michael Bierut (2010) Victore or, Who Died and Made You Boss? Abrams ISBN 0-8109-9591-3
- Victore, James; Ross MacDonald (2011) In and Out with Dick and Jane: A Loving Parody Abrams Image ISBN 0810997592
- Victore, James (2011) Lust: A Traveling Art Journal of Graphic Designer Rockport Publishers ISBN 1592536050
- Victore, James (2019) Feck Perfuction: Dangerous Ideas on the Business of Life Chronicle Books ISBN 9781452166360
