= Liz McQuiston =

Liz McQuiston is an American British graphic designer and author. She is the former head of the Department of Graphic Art and Design at the Royal College of Art.

== Books ==
- Protest!: A History of Social and Political Protest Graphics (Princeton University Press, 2019)
- Visual Impact: Creative Dissent in the 21st Century (Phaidon, 2015)
- Graphic Agitation 2: Social and Political Graphics in the Digital Age. Phaidon. 2004.
- Suffragettes to She Devils: Women's Liberation and Beyond. Phaidon. 1997.
- Graphic Agitation: Social and Political Graphics since the Sixties. Phaidon. 1995.
- Women in Design : A Contemporary View. Rizzoli. 1988. ISBN 9780847809448.
- with Barry Kitts Graphic Design Source Book (Macdonald Orbis, 1987)
