= Siavash Saffari =

Iranian political scientist

- سیاوش صفاری
- Education: University of Alberta (PhD), McMaster University (MA), Simon Fraser University (BA)
- Awards: Best First Book Award
- Scientific career
- Institutions: Seoul National University
- Thesis: Reclaiming Islam and Modernity: A Neo-Shariati Revisiting of Ali Shariati's Intellectual Discourse in Post-revolutionary Iran (2013)
- Doctoral advisor: Mojtaba Mahdavi
- Website: siavashsaffari.com

Siavash Saffari is an Iranian political scientist and professor of West Asian Studies at Seoul National University. He is known for his works on Iranian intellectual history.

== Books ==
- Beyond Shariati: Modernity, Cosmopolitanism, and Islam in Iranian Political Thought, Cambridge University Press 2017
- Unsettling Colonial Modernity in Islamicate Contexts, co-edited with Roxana Akhbari, Kara Abdolmaleki, and Evelyn Hamdon, Cambridge Scholars Publishing, 2017
- Spirit and Defiance: Ali Shariati in Translation (forthcoming from University of Minnesota Press)
