= Aurélien Jeanney =

French illustrator and graphic artist

Aurélien Jeanney is a French illustrator and graphic artist, best known for his exhibition Midi Minuit that was exhibited across India in 2023 and for illustrating the children's book Les Voyages extraordinaires d’Axel (2020). He has also previously exhibited at the Cannes Lions International Festival of Creativity.
