= Kijuro Yahagi =

Japanese artist

- Born: 25 February 1952 (age 74); Yamagata, Japan
- Education: The Graduate School of Architecture, Waseda University
- Known for: Photography, sculpture, conceptual art, graphic design, architectural design, furniture design, writing
- Notable work: HIDDEN JAPAN (1993), Shot by a Sight (1988), One's Point of View (1994)
- Awards: Special prize at the 8th International Poster Biennale Warsaw, Poland (1980), Gold prize at the 13th International Poster Biennale Warsaw, Poland (1990)

Kijuro Yahagi (矢萩 喜從郎; born 1952) is a Japanese artist, designer, architect and photographer.

== Biography ==
Kijuro Yahagi was born in Yamagata Prefecture in 1952. He completed the graduate School of Science and Engineering, Waseda University. He works on graphic design, conceptual art, photography, sculpture, architecture, furniture, way finding design, publishing, criticism etc. He teaches at Keio University and Waseda University.

== Awards ==
1980: International Poster Biennale in Warsaw Special Prize
1990: International Poster Biennale in Warsaw Gold Prize

== Works ==
Since the 1980s, he has established an international reputation for his innovative art and design work. He uses his unique concept of modeling derived from the phenomenon of nystagmus (constant, minute, and involuntary movement of the eyeball) and Imaginary Boundary Planes, as well as the term “phenomenon as a dynamic state“ to develop a diverse range of genres of express. To trace his contemplation and activities over a period of about 35 years, an exhibition was held at Museum of Modern Art, Kamakura & Hayama from November 2021 to January 2022. The exhibition featured over 400 works and materials. The main works exhibited were HIDDEN JAPAN: a collection of photographs which was exhibited around the world from 1999 to 2012 as part of Japan Foundation's overseas touring exhibition, conceptual art in the same format as a B1 size (728 x 1030 mm) poster, sculptures, and graphic works that no one has ever produced before.

== Yahagi’s notable conceptual artworks include the following ==
Shot by a Sight (1988)
Events Presented Themselves to Me in Their Logical Sequence (1989)
To the Best of One's Memory (1990)
Perceiving by Sight (1992)
Thin-Skinned (1993)
One's Point of View (1994)
Hidden Accumulated Vision (1998)
View Points of Intersection (1999)
Existence Appearance through Insight (2000)
Piercing memories [1], [2] (2002)
Piercing One’s Eyes (2002)
Magnetic Vision (2009)
The Space of Magnetic Vision (2014)
Universe (2020)
Fragment (2020)
Mirage on Mirage (2023)
