= Rudolf Grüttner =

German stamp designer and graphic designer

- Born: March 5, 1933 (age 93); Schweidnitz, Germany
- Education: Technical School for Applied Arts, Berlin; Karl Marx University, Leipzig
- Occupations: Graphic designer; stamp designer; professor
- Known for: Stamp design; commercial art; rector of Kunsthochschule Berlin-Weißensee

Rudolf Grüttner (born 5 March 1933 in Schweidnitz) is a German stamp designer and graphic designer.

Grüttner was a professor of commercial art for many years and served as rector of the Berlin Art School between 1988 and 1990, and awarded the Goethepreis of Berlin in 1988.

== Biography ==
After his apprenticeship as a sign painter from 1947 to 1950, Rudolf Grüttner first worked as a poster painter until 1952. He then studied a degree in commercial graphics at the Technical School for Applied Arts in Berlin. This was followed by distance learning at the Karl Marx University in Leipzig until 1959, which he finished as a technical school teacher. During the following year he was employed in the same capacity at the Technical School for Applied Arts in Berlin and then until 1966 as chief graphic designer of the magazine Freie Welt. After working freelance as a commercial artist in Berlin, he was appointed lecturer at the Kunsthochschule Berlin-Weißensee in 1975, where he also worked as a professor from 1978. After Walter Womacka left, he was assigned as rector of the Kunsthochschule Berlin-Weißensee from 1988 to 1991.

His extensive work includes numerous posters, stamps, record sleeves and book covers.
