= Mikhail Rojter =

Soviet book illustrator and graphics artist

Mikhail Grigorevich Rojter (Russian: Ройтер, Михаил Григорьевич) (sometimes Roiter), 1916–1993, was a prominent Soviet book illustrator and graphics artist.

== Biography ==
Mikhail Rojter was born in Vinnytsia in Ukraine in 1916 and received his first education in fine arts at the RabFak section of the Kiev Art Institute which provided education for the children of workers. In 1937 he entered the VTsSPS (Moscow Art Institute), where his teachers were Konstantin Yuon, Nikolai Romadin and Aminadav Kanevskii. From 1946 he became a member of the Artists' Union.

== Works ==
His talent was noticed by Igor Grabar of the Surikov Institute, and in 1939 he was admitted directly to the third year at the Graphics Department, where his professors were Konstantin Istomin, Mikhail Rodionov, Nikolai Radlov and Matvei Dobrov. He specialised in book illustrations and chose illustrations to Dostoevsky’s tale “The Insulted and Humiliated” as his graduate work in 1946. The same year he entered the Artists’ Union, and in 1947 he participated in the first World Youth Festival in Prague, and was awarded an honorary diploma for his illustrations.

His first official work, in 1949, was to provide illustrations for Dostoevsky’s book “The Raw Youth”, and until the end of his career he remained faithful to the craft of book illustration. Dostoevsky was always his favourite, and Rojter illustrated such works as “Netochka Nezvanova”, “A Gentle Creature”, “The Brothers Karamazov”, and “The Possessed”. From his early student years, his preferred graphics, working in Indian ink and watercolour, as well as prints, mainly etching, lithography, monotype, and occasionally linocut.

From the late 1950s he travelled extensively in the USSR, as a special correspondent for the Pravda, Komsomolskaya Pravda and Literaturnaya Gazeta newspapers, and the journals Ogonyok and Yunost, documenting these trips with drawings and prints of the Bratsk and Krasnoyarsk hydropower plants, the industrial Urals, the oil fields of Baku, and the Moskvich car factory in Moscow. He worked in the Far East and Kamchatka, in Pamir, Murmansk, and in Ukraine.

Also during the 1950s, he developed a passion for depicting sports, both in strong expressive prints, and in wonderfully soft impressionistic watercolours. He was considered one of the leading artists working in the sports genre. Another favourite theme of his was Soviet Youth: Students, Komsomols and Pioneers, Siberian youth, young workers and sports-youth populate his genre works of the 1950s and 1960s.

From the late 1970s onwards, he concentrated on watercolours, showing the changing faces of the cities of Moscow and St. Petersburg and other provincial cities during a time of major architectural changes. He painted large impressionistic cityscapes of the disappearing Moscow, and the new city emerging, as well as Dostoevsky’s St. Petersburg which held a special place in his heart.

== Bibliography ==
- Catalogue from personal exhibition, 1961
- Sports in the Fine Arts - (6 illustrations), 1963
- Catalogue from personal exhibition, 1968
- Catalogue from personal exhibition, Moskovskii Khudozhnik, 5th oct. 1977
- Catalogue from personal exhibition, 1988
- Catalogue from personal exhibition, 2006
- "Mikhail Rojter" — Masters of Soviet Art, volume 2 (In English and Russian). Gamborg Gallery, 2008
