= Alison Donalty =

American graphic designer

Alison Donalty is the cover designer for the renowned black-humored children's books A Series of Unfortunate Events, and designed series spin-off The Beatrice Letters. Her name has a cameo appearance in The Hostile Hospital as an anagram, "Lisa N. Lootnday", on a list of patients. She designs about 30 book covers each year at HarperCollins Children's Books.
