= Siyavuş Pasha =

Siyavuş Paşa may refer to:

- Kanijeli Siyavuş Pasha (died 1602), Ottoman grand vizier (1582–84, 1586–89, 1592–93)
- Abaza Siyavuş Pasha I (died 1656), Ottoman grand vizier (1651, 1656)
- Abaza Siyavuş Pasha (died 1688), Ottoman grand vizier (1687–88)
