= Ron Miriello =

American graphic designer, sculptor and speaker

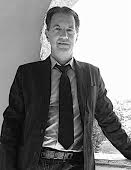
- Ron Miriello, Designer
- Born: September 2, 1953 (age 72); Cranford, New Jersey

Ron Miriello (born September 2, 1953 in Cranford, New Jersey) is an American graphic designer, sculptor and speaker. Miriello is the director of Miriello Grafico and a founding member of the San Diego Chapter of the American Institute of Graphic Arts. In 2008, he was recognized as an AIGA national fellow.

== Biography ==
Miriello studied at Colorado State University and completed his design degree in Italy at La Poggerina, operated by the University of Texas.

In 1989, Miriello was instrumental in acquiring an important collection of 300 historical graphic posters from the government of the Soviet Union that depicted contemporary Soviet life in the periods during Perestroika and Glasnost. Working with members of the American Institute of Graphic Arts (AIGA) San Diego chapter, this exhibition was supported by a grant from the National Endowment of the Arts. The rare collection of posters held at the La Jolla Museum of Contemporary Art, showcased political themes, social issues and the arts. The collection then traveled to a variety of U.S. locations, after the fall of the Soviet Union. The posters were designed between 1986 and 1989 by the Union of Soviet Artists members. The original posters were collected and curated by Oleg Savostiuk, Secretary to the Union of Soviet Artists and he attended the original opening in La Jolla. In March 2013, the Soviet Poster Show collection was uncrated at the City Gallery in a new exhibition called Dialogues in downtown San Diego. The Soviet historical posters were featured alongside new works created by contemporary artists, designers and illustrators including Sean Adams, Rafael López, Joel Nakamura and Michael Osborne, among others. To complement their historical counterparts the new posters featured political, social and arts themes as well as a visual or conceptual reference to Soviet culture.

The Museum of The Cold War / Wende Museum in Culver City, California, displayed the Miriello Soviet Poster Show as a major component of their exhibition, Crumblings Empire: The Power of Dissident Voices .The exhibition mixed the contemporary work of artist Shepard Fairey, who protest poster work is heavily inspired by the Soviet graphic tradition.

Ron Miriello served on the Design Innovation Institute advisory board, the San Diego Center City Advisory Council, Business Roundtable for Education, Advisory board member for the San Diego Italian Film Festival. In 2008, Ron Miriello, Margo Chase, Rian Hughes and Alex White co-authored the book Really Good Logos Explained critiquing the logo work of top designers. A brand strategist working in southern California, Miriello believes San Diego is impacting innovation in other parts of the world.

As a child, Miriello was fascinated with globes. A sculptor, he produced 100 sculptures inspired by the metaphor of the world globe which culminated in the 100 Worlds Project exhibit. The exhibit incorporated craftspeople and makers as collaborators, reconnecting the arts with the guild tradition of craft. For this exhibition Miriello produced fifty interpreted globes, using a variety of materials that included antique pipe wrenches, bowling balls, the propellers of boats and corrugated cardboard. The globes were then given to forty San Diego–based photographers who spent a week with each sculpture and documented it through personal photography. In 2016 the globes were exhibited at San Diego's Lindbergh field in Terminal 2.

In 2016 he started a bicycle event, 100Miglia, making it possible for cyclists to explore one hundred miles of farm routes and old castles. In 2021, the Miriello exhibition 3 Italian Steel Bicycles, was installed at Quint Gallery in La Jolla, California. The exhibit featured vintage artisan-made steel bicycles and their storied histories.

In 2021 Miriello co-launched a community-wide bicycle center campaign to convert a Navy barracks into a non-profit place for all forms of bicycling in the San Diego / Tijuana region. The project, call Liberty Bike Commons is a collaboration with the San Diego Bicycle Coalition The City of San Diego and the private sector.

In 2021 designer Ron Miriello and the architectural firm of Carrier Johnson + Culture have won the San Diego Architectural Fund Association's top urban design award for outstanding contributions to urban design.

Miriello’s 2024 exhibition Found Adrift | Timeless featured a collection of artworks, including canvas pieces, textiles, and lithographs, inspired by an 1876 seaweed scrapbook uncovered in Maine. The director of the San Diego Natural History Museum’s research library highlights sea weeding as a Victorian-era hobby among young women, with Queen Victoria herself engaging in the craft during childhood. The exhibition aimed to blend artistic representation with scientific curiosity while paying homage to the resilience and creativity of women of that period.

== Books ==
- Pederson, B. Martin (2005-03-15). Designers USA. Graphis Press. ISBN 1-932026-17-7.
- Hot Graphics USA. Madison Square Press. 2001-12-01. ISBN 0-06-621361-4.
- Fishel, Catharine (2005-04-01). 401 Design Meditations. Rockport Publishers. ISBN 1-59253-127-X.
- Miriello, Ron; Margo Chase; Rian Hughes; Alex White (2008-05-01). Really Good Logos Explained. Rockport Publishers. ISBN 978-1-59253-427-2.
- McCallam, Ian (2010-04-27). Where We Work. Harper Collins Publishers. ISBN 978-0-06-175797-6.
