= Siavash Fani =

Iranian-Canadian graphic designer

- Born: Tehran, Iran
- Occupation: Graphic Designer
- Known for: Graphic Design - Visual Communications
- Website: Official Website; Website

Siavash Fani is an Iranian-Canadian graphic designer.

== Life and education ==
He went to the visual art school in 1992. After that in 1996 he started studying visual communications (Graphic Design) at Azad university in Tehran B.A - M.A. He was pretty interested in design and for this reason he selected working for the newspapers and magazine for 7 years. He also continued his education and received his master in visual communication (Graphic Design) from Azad university in Tehran and Interactive Media Management at George Brown College in Toronto, Canada. User Experience Design at OCADU in Toronto, Canada.

== Work history ==
He worked as a designer and director in a lot of newspaper design studios like Hayateno newspaper, Soroush magazine, Hamshahri newspaper and also Iran newspaper and some advertising agencies until 2010. He also was an instructor at Humber College and OCADU University in Toronto, Ontario.

== Awards ==
- Winner of youth Iranian visual arts festival in illustration 1998, Shiraz, Iran.
- 3rd prize, bank and environment poster competition 2004, Tehran, Iran.
- Winner of 7th Iranian Teenagers Press Festival for the best cover design in Tik-Tak Jam-e-Jam newspaper 2005, Tehran, Iran.
- 3rd prize in 5th Press Festival in urban areas for the best newspaper layouts in Iran newspaper, 2008, Tehran, Iran.
- Winner of Tirgan festival magazine cover contest 2011, Toronto, Ontario, Canada.

== Exhibitions ==
IX International Eco-poster Triennial "the 4th Block" 2015, Kharkiv, Ukraine

Happy New Year 2015! Toronto, Ontario, Canada

Happy New Year 2014! Toronto, Ontario, Canada

IX International Eco-poster Triennial "the 4th Block" 2012, Kharkiv, Ukraine

Persianissimo + 10, poster exhibition 2011, Toronto, Ontario, Canada

Web poster exhibition - Posters about the earthquake in Japan 2011

Posters for Steve Jobs 2011, Toronto, Ontario, Canada

Web exhibition - Happy New Year 2011

Anniversary of 9/11, web poster exhibition 2011

Lahti Poster Biennial 2011, Lahti, Finland.

Divarkoob poster exhibition 2010, Tehran, Iran.

A colorful day! poster exhibition 2010, Tehran, Iran.

Arts Hole

Third International Biennial of Posters of the Islamic World 2009, Tehran, Iran

25 years of Iranian Theatrical posters 2008, Tehran, Iran.

Urban management poster exhibition 2008, Tehran, Iran.

Second International Biennial of Posters of the Islamic World 2007, Tehran, Iran

International Day of Disabled Persons, 2007 Rene Wanner's Poster Page

International contest of art resistance 2006, Tehran, Iran

Melli bank and environment poster competition 2004, Tehran, Iran

First annual book cover design competition 2003, Tehran, Iran

First Self-Promotional Posters Exhibition of Iranian Graphic Designers 2001 Tehran Museum of Contemporary Art, Tehran, Iran.

== See also ==
DPI Magazine Interview

A book name New Visual Culture of Modern Iran, 2006, Amsterdam, Netherlands

Member of Registered Graphic Designers, RGD October 2014 – Present

Member of Iranian Graphic Designers Society (IGDS) September 2003 – Present

Member of International Journalist Federation (IFJ) April 2000 – Present
