= Steven Brower =

American graphic designer and writer (1952–2026)

Steven Ian Brower (June 23, 1952 – July 24, 2026) was an American graphic designer and writer. His work appeared in international and national design annuals and books on design.

== Biography ==
Brower was related to Milton Glaser, who was his mother’s cousin. He grew up in The Bronx and attended the High School of Music & Art and the School of Visual Arts in New York City. He was a graduate of California State University, Fullerton and National University. He was the director of the "Get Your Masters with the Masters" MFA of Marywood University in Scranton, Pennsylvania.

During his tenure as creative director at Print, the magazine garnered two National Magazine Awards for General Excellence and gold and silver awards from the Society of Publication Designers.

His work was honored by AIGA, the Art Directors Club, the American Center for Design, the BRNO Biennale Association, and the Type Directors Club. He was an art director at the New York Times and The Nation, and his work is in the permanent collection of the Smithsonian Institution.

Woody Guthrie Artworks, co-authored by Brower and Nora Guthrie and designed by Brower, was published in 2005. The book won a silver prize in the Foreword Awards and the top prize in the New York Book Show, both in the fine art category.

In 2006 he designed and co-authored 2D: Visual Basics for Designers with Robin Landa and Rose Gonnella. Satchmo: The Wonderful Art and World of Louis Armstrong was published in 2009. In late 2010 two books that Brower designed and authored were published: From Shadow to Light: The Life and Art of Mort Meskin and Breathless Homicidal Slime Mutants: The Art of the Paperpack. The latter "chronicles the history of the paperback format and highlights the designers behind the tantalizing cover art that became its signature selling point."

In early 2011 the first exhibit of Brower's design work "Eye, Brower: A twenty five year retrospective" was held in the Visual Arts Gallery of The Art Institute of California.

Brower died on July 24, 2026 aged 74.

== Bibliography ==
=== Books written and designed by Steven Brower ===
- 2D: Visual Basics for Designers (with Robin Landa and Rose Gonnella)
- Amazing, Mysterious, Weird & True: The Pulp Work of Comic Book Artists (with Jim Simon)
- Breathless Homicidal Slime Mutants: The Art of the Paperback
- Duke Ellington: An American Composer and Icon (with Mercedes Ellington)
- From Shadow to Light: The Life and Art of Mort Meskin
- Golden Age Western Comics
- Inside Art Direction: Case studies and Interviews
- Satchmo: The Wonderful World of Louis Armstrong
- Woody Guthrie Artworks (with Nora Guthrie)

=== Written and edited by Steven Brower ===
- Mort Meskin: Out of the Shadows

=== Edited and designed by Steven Brower ===
- Woody Guthrie's Wardy Forty: Greystone Park State Hospital Revisited (by Phil Buehler with Nora Guthrie)
