= Louise Sandhaus =

American graphic designer

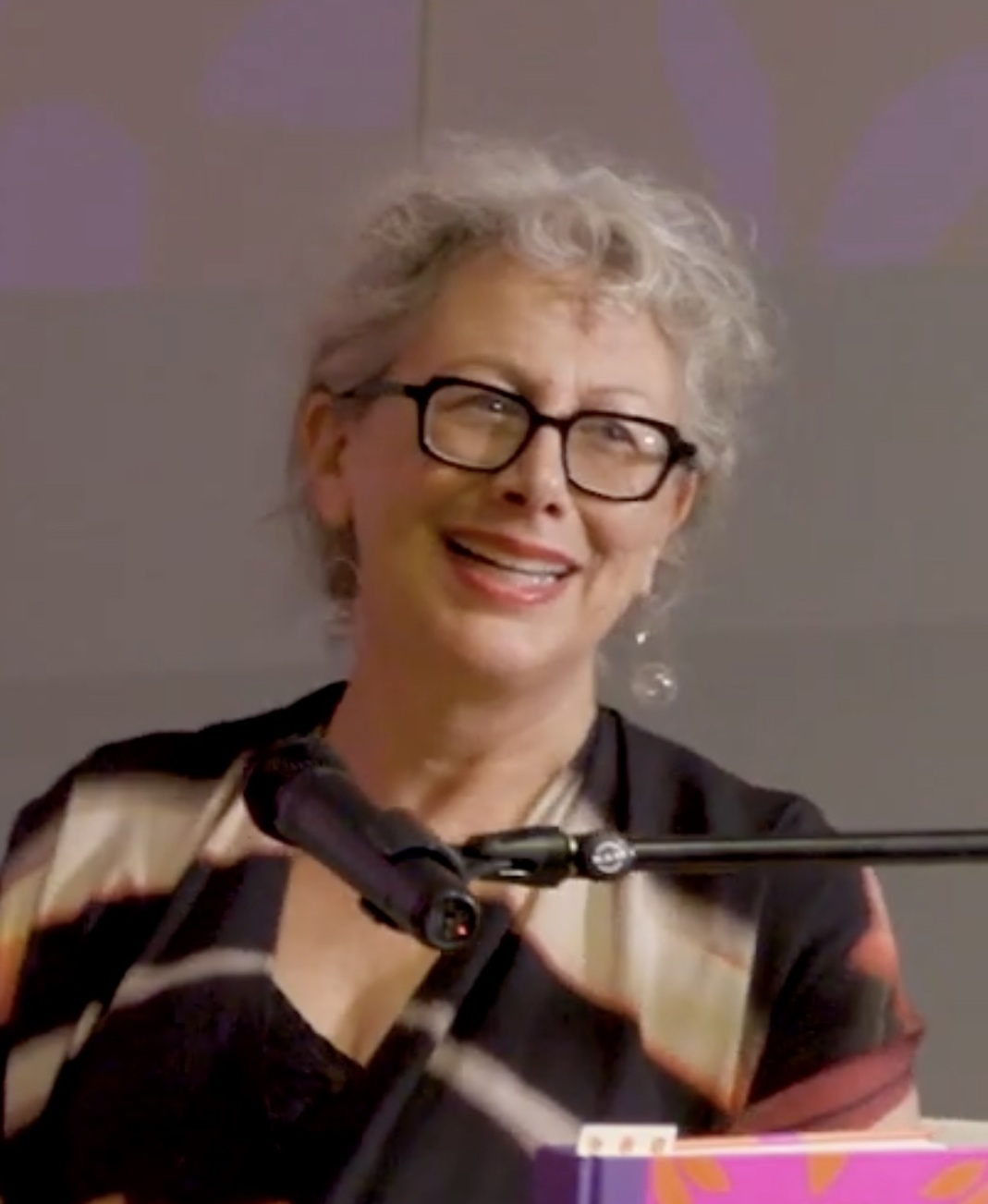
- Sandhaus at Cooper Hewitt (2019)
- Born: 1955 (age 70–71); Sharon, Massachusetts
- Known for: Graphic design
- Website: lsd-studio.net

Louise Sandhaus (born 1955) is an American graphic designer and design educator. She is a professor at the California Institute of the Arts and the principal of Louise Sandhaus Design. She was awarded the AIGA Medal in recognition of her contributions to American design as author and mentor.

== Early life and education ==
Louise Sandhouse was born in 1955 outside Boston, Massachusetts to Norman, an art director, and Harriet Sandhaus, a newspaper columnist. The family later relocated to Orlando, Florida.

Sandhaus received an associate degree in advertising design from The Art Institute of Fort Lauderdale in 1976. She earned her BFA and MFA in graphic design from the California Institute of the Arts (CalArts) in 1993 and 1994. She received a Graduate Laureate from the Jan Van Eyck Academie in The Netherlands in 1996.

== Career ==
Sandhaus worked for MIT Press in Boston in the 1980s under Muriel Cooper, the first design director. She started teaching at CalArts in 1996 and founded her design studio, Louise Sandhaus Design (LSD), in 1998. She was the co-director of the CalArts Graphic Design Program from 1998 to 2004 and was the program's sole director from 2004 to 2006.

Since 1999, Sandhaus has collaborated with the architecture firm Durfee Regn as Durfee Regn Sandhaus. The collective has designed museum exhibitions and interdisciplinary projects. Her work is included in the San Francisco Museum of Modern Art's permanent collection and the Bibliothèque nationale de France in Paris. She co-curated the Graphic Design section of the 2010 California Design Biennial Action/Reaction.

Sandhaus received the AIGA Los Angeles Fellow Award in 2009 and served on the organization's national board from 2009 to 2011. Throughout 2017–2018 she worked with AIGA on Making History, a national initiative to build and preserve graphic design history through crowdsourcing and using digital tools.

Sandhaus's book on West Coast design history, Earthquakes, Mudslides, Fires and Riots: California and Graphic Design 1936–1986 was inspired by English architectural historian Reyner Banham. The book received exceptional press coverage including reviews from The New York Times, The Guardian (London), The Los Angeles Review of Books, and Eye magazine. An exhibition including page spreads of the proposed book was held at Los Angeles Municipal Art Gallery in 2008. While working on Earthquakes, Mudslides, Fires and Riots Sandhaus came up with an idea to start a crowdsourced digital archive of graphic design, which in 2021 grew into The People's Graphic Design Archive, a website she co-founded with design educators Briar Levit and Brockett Horne.

In 2022, she was awarded the AIGA Medal for her work as an educator and author.

== Selected publications ==
- Sandhaus, Louise (October 19, 2012). "Merle Armitage: Daddy of a Sunbaked Modernism". Design Observer.
