= Muriel Cooper =

Book designer, digital designer, researcher, and educator

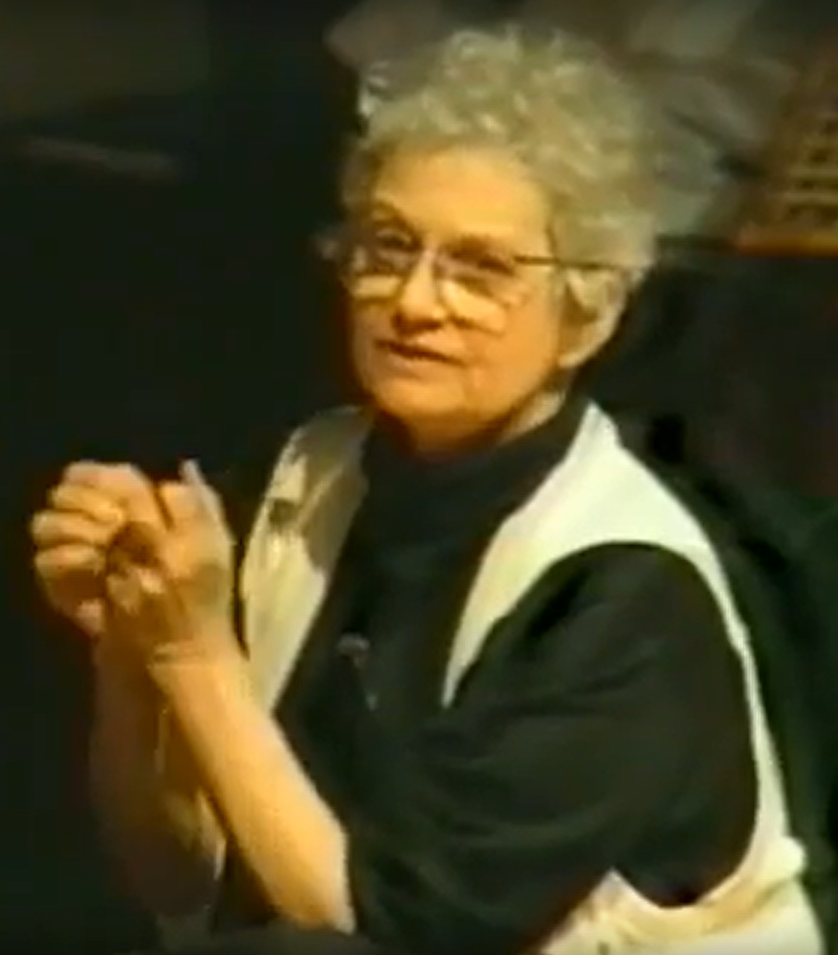
- Muriel Cooper presenting "Information Landscapes" at the 1994 TED5 conference
- Born: Muriel Ruth Cooper; 1925; Brookline, Massachusetts
- Died: May 26, 1994 (aged 68–69); Boston, Massachusetts
- Education: Massachusetts College of Art and Design (BFA 1948, BSEd 1951); Ohio State University (BA 1944)
- Known for: Graphic design
- Notable work: Bauhaus (book design), Learning from Las Vegas (book design)
- Movement: Modernist
- Awards: 1994 AIGA Medal
- Patrons: Massachusetts Institute of Technology

Muriel Cooper (1925 – May 26, 1994) was an American pioneering book designer, digital designer, researcher, and educator. She was the first design director of the MIT Press, instilling a Bauhaus-influenced design style into its many publications. She moved on to become founder of MIT's Visible Language Workshop, and later became a co-founder of the MIT Media Lab. In 2007, a New York Times article called her "the design heroine you've probably never heard of".

== Early life, education, and influences ==
Muriel Ruth Cooper was born in 1925 in Brookline, an inner suburb of Boston, Massachusetts. She was the oldest daughter of three children.

Cooper received her Bachelor of Arts degree from Ohio State in 1944, and a Bachelor of Fine Art in design in 1948 and a Bachelor of Science in education in 1951 from Massachusetts College of Art (MassArt). After her graduation, Cooper moved to New York City and attempted to find a position in advertising. She met Paul Rand, who was influential to her design "way of life".

== MIT Press (1952-1974) ==
Muriel Cooper designed this iconic MIT Press logo in the early 1960s

In 1952, Cooper was recommended to and then recruited by John Mattill to join the newly formed Massachusetts Institute of Technology Office of Publications, which would eventually become MIT Press. There, she collaborated with György Kepes, professor of visual design at MIT and former colleague of artist László Moholy-Nagy in Hungary. She soon was appointed to head the Office, newly renamed to Design Services, which was one of the first university design programs in the country.

In 1955, Cooper recruited graphic designer and fellow MassArt alumna Jacqueline Casey to begin her own lengthy career at MIT, where her friend would design many posters and smaller publications in a modernist style. At MassArt, they had worked together as cashiers and then as bookkeepers at the school store, and had also used the space as an informal studio after hours.

Cooper and Casey, along with Ralph Coburn and Dietmar Winkler, would be influential in bringing modern Swiss-style typography to MIT Press and to the related magazine that would become MIT Technology Review.

After working at MIT for six years, Cooper left in 1958 to take a Fulbright Scholarship in Milan, where she studied exhibition design.

When Cooper returned in 1963, she opened an independent graphic studio in Brookline, Massachusetts. She also taught briefly as an associate professor at MassArt.

The MIT Press was among Cooper's various clients, leading to her design of its iconic trademark colophon or publisher's logo, an abstracted set of seven vertical bars (a visual play on the vertical strokes of the initial letters "mitp", as well as the spines of a row of shelved books). The logo has been called a high-water mark in twentieth-century graphic design. The commission to design the logo had first been offered to Cooper's old mentor Paul Rand, who demurred and recommended her for the job.

In 1967, Cooper returned to a full-time position as design director of the MIT Press, having been recommended by Paul Rand. Among many other publications, she designed the classic book Bauhaus (published by MIT Press in 1969, the 50th anniversary of the German design school's founding). This project dominated her work for nearly two years, to enlarge, revise, and completely redesign an American version of an earlier German edition. She set the book in the newly available Helvetica typeface and used a grid system page layout, giving the book a strong modernist appearance. Cooper also made a film rendition of the book, which attempted to give an accelerated depiction of translating interactive experiences from a computer to paper. This endeavor was her response to the challenge of turning time into space.

As the design director of MIT Press, Cooper promoted the Bauhaus-influenced, modernist look of a large quantity of publications, including 500 books. She designed the first edition of Learning from Las Vegas (1972), the ground-breaking manifesto of Post-Modernist design, using radical variations on the Bauhaus style to produce the publication. A third influential book design was a collection of essays by Herbert Muschamp, titled File Under Architecture (1974). This was one of the first books to be typeset directly on a computer by the book designer. At the time, the only typeface available was monospaced Courier, but she used the capabilities of computer typesetting to achieve a new level of control over the detailed layout of each page.

Cooper was influential in introducing computers to MIT Press design; in 1967, she had audited MIT professor Nicholas Negroponte's course on "Computers and Design", which increased her growing fascination with developing digital technology. She admitted to being "bewildered" by the course, but nonetheless realized the growing importance of computers to publishing and design in general, and was unafraid to recruit others with expertise in computers to help develop their application to design.

Cooper maintained her full-time position with the MIT Press until 1974, and oversaw the release of multiple series of titles in architecture, economics, biology, computer science, and sociology that formed a critical discourse around systems, feedback loops, and control. She then continued to hold a part-time designation as “Special Projects Director” at MIT Press.

== Visible Language Workshop (1974-1984) ==
At 49 years old in 1973, Cooper was already well known in the design industry. Starting around 1974, Cooper gradually phased out of her full-time position at MIT Press to found the MIT Visual Language Workshop with the designer, Ron MacNeil.

Cooper taught interactive media design as the founder and head of the Visible Language Workshop (VLW). She was recognized as a pioneer in designing and changing the landscape of electronic communication. Although she never learned to program computers, she could see the design possibilities opened up by the technology, and worked closely with programmers and engineers to experiment with new concepts in the presentation of complex information. In 1976, her students literally broke down the (physical and metaphoric) wall between design and production of media, experimenting with a wide variety of new computing, electronics, and printing technologies.

The MIT students had very diverse backgrounds and interests, and Cooper emphasized a generalist approach, encouraging them to switch flexibly among editorial, platemaking, printing, typesetting, and design tasks. In the mid-1970s, VLW students would work overnight to produce posters for campus-wide events, including designs by Cooper's former Design Services colleagues, Jacqueline Casey and Ralph Coburn. Cooper explored early versions of nearby Polaroid Corporation's new SX-70 instant color camera, as well as experimental large-format Polaroid cameras and film. In the early 1980s, Cooper secured major funding from the Outdoor Advertising Association, and pioneered the development of large-scale printers that could quickly produce billboard-sized high-resolution graphics and eventually full-color photographs.

Around this time, Cooper was asked for a 250-word concise biography. She summarized her career to date in 65 words:

Muriel Cooper/first designer/art director MIT Office of Publications | Fulbright Scholarship, Milan, Italy/ Consulting firm Muriel Cooper Media Design | Media Director MIT Press/ currently Director Visible Language Workshop | Associate Professor Department of Architecture/ Special Projects Director MIT Press.

Her concerns have always been with beginnings and process. | More with change and technology and their meanings to human communication than with rigorous graphic design theory and style.

At the VLW, Cooper pursued a constant examination of graphic production in multiple media, and led a team of graduate students and researchers in the search of new forms, methods and techniques for graphic design that were specific to the emerging context of text on a computer display.

== MIT Media Lab (1985-1994) ==
In 1985 the Visible Language Workshop, the MIT Architecture Machine Group, and the Center for Advanced Visual Studies (CAVS) were combined to form the MIT Media Lab. There Cooper joined its new director Nicholas Negroponte and faculty members such as Marvin Minsky and Seymour Papert. She personally knew many of her new colleagues, having earlier worked with them on their books published by MIT Press.

She taught and influenced a generation of students who later became prominent digital designers, including Lisa Strausfeld (a partner at Pentagram Design), and John Maeda, who succeeded her at the MIT Media Lab, and then served as president of the Rhode Island School of Design from 2008 to 2013.

In 1994, at the TED 5 conference in Monterey, California, Cooper presented a collection of work that had been recently done by her students in the VLW. The demos demonstrated experiments in dynamic, interactive, computer-based typography, themes which Cooper had been exploring through much of her career. In 1978, had Cooper co-authored a "Books without Pages" proposal to the National Science Foundation to explore computer typography and computer workstations. Although the NSF declined to fund the project, she obtained support from the Office of Naval Research and the Defense Advanced Research Projects Agency (DARPA), a funding source later used by the Media Lab.

In addition to Cooper's involvement in the VLW and TED5, she also worked with groups such as the Special Interest Group on Computer Human Interaction (SIGCHI) of the Association for Computing Machinery. Her interests in computer graphics and typography anticipated later developments in user interface on personal computers and smartphones.

== Legacy ==
Professor Muriel Cooper died unexpectedly at the New England Medical Center in Boston, after an apparent heart attack at the age of 68, on May 26, 1994. At the time of her death, she was still active as a full-time professor and was the first and only female tenured professor in the MIT Media Lab.

About a year later, a retrospective exhibition at the Media Lab reviewed her life and career. In 1997, the Design Management Institute established a prize in her name that "honors an individual who, like Muriel herself, challenges our understanding and experience of interactive digital communication". In 2014, the Arthur Ross Architecture Gallery at Columbia University hosted a retrospective of her work entitled Messages and Means: Muriel Cooper at MIT.

In 2017, MIT Press published a large-format, slipcased hardcover book, reviewing Cooper's career and providing many examples of her design work.

In 2023, the Museum of Modern Art (MoMA) in New York City acquired her MIT Press colophon design into its permanent collection.

Archives of Muriel Cooper's work and papers are held at the Morton R. Godine Library at the Massachusetts College of Art and Design, her alma mater.

== Publications ==
=== 1989 ===
- "Computers and Design", in Design Quarterly, no.142

== See also ==
- Felice Frankel
