= Dorothea Hofmann =

Swiss graphic designer (1929–2023)

Dorothea Schmid Hofmann
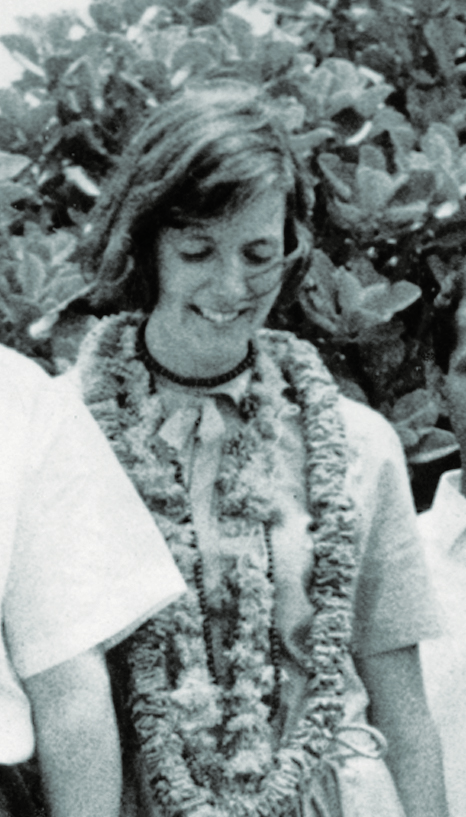
- Dorothea Hofmann at NID Ahmedabad, c.1965
- Born: 9 October 1929; Lucerne, Switzerland
- Died: 26 July 2023 (aged 93)
- Other name: Dorli
- Education: Schule für Gestaltung Basel
- Occupation: Graphic designer
- Known for: Typography and design education
- Notable work: Die Geburt eines Stils (The Birth of a Style)
- Style: Swiss graphic design
- Movement: International Typographic Style
- Spouse: Armin Hofmann (m. 1953)

Dorothea Hofmann (née Schmid, 9 October 1929 – 26 July 2023), also known as Dorli, was a Swiss graphic designer, artist, educator and the author of Die Geburt eines Stils (The Birth of a Style). She was one of the first students who passed the Basel education model. She took several educational trips to various parts of the world. Hofmann collaborated closely with her partner Armin on developing design education.

== Life and work ==
Hofmann trained as a graphic designer at Schule für Gestaltung Basel, Switzerland. Dorothea married graphic designer and pedagogue Armin Hofmann in 1953 during her third year of a graphic design course where Armin was her teacher. Armin had opened a graphic design studio with Dorothea in 1947. They were married for 67 years and lived together in Lucerne, Switzerland. Hoffmann undertook numerous further education trips to Italy, Spain, France, Holland, Mexico, Guatemala, Egypt, India, the US and more.

Dorothea Hofmann taught at various art and design schools such as Yale University School of Art, New York Studio School of Drawing, Painting and Sculpture, Atlanta College of Art, Museo de Arte Contemporaneo de Oaxaca in Mexico, The New York Studio School of Art, and the National Institute of Design Ahmedabad; she presented her work at exhibitions in Switzerland and abroad. When the Hofmanns visited National Institute of Design in Ahmedabad, Dorothea acted as Armin's translator while he advised in the formulation of the graphic design course, and she took one course in Letter Design at the institute in 1964 during the six months she spent there. The Hofmanns had their summer home at Brissago where Yale Graphic Design workshops took place from 1977 to 1996.

Hofmann's book Die Geburt eines Stils (The Birth of a Style) studies the influence of the Basel education model on Swiss graphic design. It includes works of Swiss graphic designers who were teachers and students of Basel Allgemeine Gewerbeschule or Schule für Gestaltung Basel, like Hermann Eidenbenz, Emil Ruder, Armin Hofmann, Karl Gerstner, Gérard Ifert, Nelly Rudin, Pierre Mendell, Wolfgang Weingart, Kenneth Hiebert, Dan Friedman (graphic designer), April Greiman, Thérèse Moll, Elisabeth Dietschi, Heidi Schatzmann, Sigrid Bovensiepen, Inge Druckrey, Barbara Stauffacher Solomon and more.

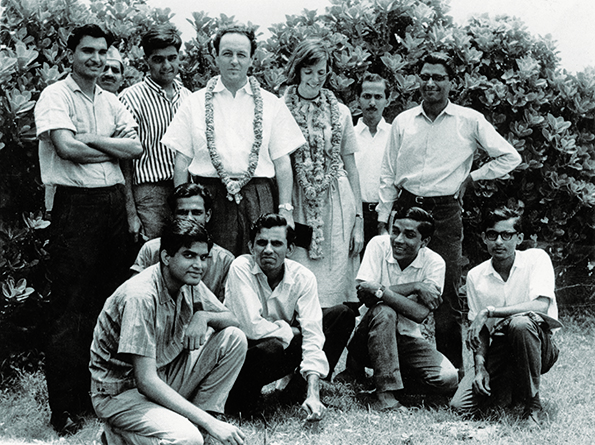
(L-R standing) P.M. Dalwadi, Maharajji (with cap), Vikas Satwalekar, Armin Hofmann, Dorothea Hofmann, Manu Gajjar, and Arjun Gajjar. (L-R seated) I.S. Mathur, S.Balaram, Ishu Patel, Rohit Modi, and Mahendra C. Patel

Hofmann died on 26 July 2023, at the age of 93.

== Exhibitions ==
Hofmann’s first verified exhibition was Dorothea Hofmann, Meret Oppenheim, K.R.H. Sonderborg - Zeichnungen at Galerie Handschin in Basel in 1966, and the most recent exhibition was 39è Mini print Internacional de Cadaqués a Pineda at Fundació Tharrats d’Art Gràfic in Barcelona in 2019. Hofmann is most frequently exhibited in Spain, but also had exhibitions in United States, Switzerland.

Some of her notable exhibitions have been:

=== Solo exhibitions ===
- 1990 - Dorothea Hoffman: Drawing Exhibition - Rosenwald-Wolf Gallery - The University of the Arts, Philadelphia, USA
- 1986 - Dorothea Hoffman: Drawings and Etchings - Galleries at Moore College of Art & Design, Philadelphia, USA

=== Group exhibitions ===
- 2019 - 39è Mini print Internacional de Cadaqués a Pineda - Fundació Tharrats d’Art Gràfic, Barcelona, Spain
- 2019 - 39é Mini Print Internacional de Cadaqués 2019 - Mini Print Internacional de Cadaqués, Barcelona, Spain
- 2018 - 38th Mini Print Internacional De Cadaques 2018 - Mini Print Internacional de Cadaqués, Barcelona, Spain
- 1999 - Armin and Dorothea Hofmann - The Corcoran Gallery of Art, Washington, DC, United States
- 1966 - Dorothea Hofmann, Meret Oppenheim, K.R.H. Sonderborg - Zeichnungen - Galerie Handschin, Basel, Switzerland
