= Swiss style =

Swiss style may refer to:

- International Typographic Style, also known as the Swiss Style
- Swiss chalet style, an architectural style
- Swiss-style lathe, a type of metal lathe
- Swiss Style (design), a trend in graphic design based on the International Typographic Style
