= Dan Friedman (graphic designer) =

American graphic designer (1945–1995)

- Born: August 5, 1945; Cleveland, Ohio, United States
- Died: July 6, 1995 (aged 49); New York City, New York, United States
- Education: Carnegie Institute of Technology, Ulm School of Design, Schule für Gestaltung Basel
- Occupations: educator, graphic designer, furniture designer

Dan Friedman (August 5, 1945 – July 6, 1995) was an American educator, graphic and furniture designer. He was a major contributor to the postmodern and new wave typography movements.

== Early life and education ==
Dan Friedman was born in 1945 in Cleveland, Ohio. He graduated from the Carnegie Institute of Technology. After that, he studied at the Ulm School of Design. There, he studied graphic design. He also studied at Schule für Gestaltung Basel. There, he studied under Wolfgang Weingart and Armin Hofmann. In 1969 he moved back to the United States.

== Career ==
Upon returning to America, Friedman was senior designer at Anspach Grossman Portugal, from 1975 to 1977. For three years, from 1969 to 1973, he taught at Yale University. From 1972 to 1975, he was the chairman of the board for the design department at State University of New York at Purchase. Friedman designed posters, letterheads, logos, and more, while working for Pentagram, from 1979 until 1984. Clients included Citibank and Williwear. He used found objects to create Day-Glo furniture. In 1982 he designed a book for his friend, Keith Haring. He did work for the Neotu Gallery.

Starting in 1994 he was the Frank Stanton Professor of Graphic Design at the Cooper Union.

== Death and legacy ==
Friedman died of AIDS in 1995 at St. Luke's-Roosevelt Hospital Center, New York City.

His work is held in the collection of the Art Institute of Chicago, Cooper-Hewitt, National Design Museum, and the Museum of Modern Art. In 2023, the Art Institute of Chicago held a retrospective of Friedman's work titled Dan Friedman: Stay Radical.

== Bibliography ==
- with Jeffrey Dietch, Steven Holt and Alessandro Mendini. Dan Friedman: Radical Modernism. New Haven: Yale University Press (1994). ISBN 0300058489.
- with Jeffrey Dietch. Post Human. Pully/Lausanne: FAE Musée d'Art Contemporain (1992).
