= New Wave (design) =

Typographical design philosophy

In design, New Wave or Swiss Punk Typography refers to an approach to typography that defies strict grid-based arrangement conventions. Characteristics include inconsistent letterspacing, varying typeweights within single words and type set at non-right angles.

== Description ==
New Wave design was influenced by Punk and postmodern language theory. But there is a debate as to whether New Wave is a break or a natural progression of the Swiss Style. Sans-serif font still predominates, but the New Wave differs from its predecessor by stretching the limits of legibility. The break from the grid structure meant that type could be set center, ragged left, ragged right, or chaotic. The artistic freedom produced common forms such as the bold stairstep. The text hierarchy also strayed from the top down approach of the International Style. Text became textured with the development of transparent film and the increase in collage in graphic design. Further breakdown of minimalist aesthetic is seen in the increase of the number of type sizes and colours of fonts. Although punk and psychedelia embody the anti-corporate nature of their respective groups, the similarity between New Wave and the International Style has led some to label New Wave as “softer, commercialized punk culture.”

== History ==
Wolfgang Weingart is credited with developing New Wave typography in the early 1970s at the Basel School of Design, Switzerland. New Wave along with other postmodern typographical styles, such as Punk and Psychedelia, arose as reactions to International Typographic Style or Swiss Style which was very popular with corporate culture. International Typographic Style embodied the modernist aesthetic of minimalism, functionality, and logical universal standards. Postmodernist aesthetic rebuked the less is more philosophy, by ascribing that typography can play a more expressive role and can include ornamentation to achieve this. The increase in expression aimed to improve communication. Therefore, New Wave designers such as Weingart felt intuition was just as valuable as analytical skill in composition. The outcome is an increased kinetic energy in designs.

The adoption of New Wave Typography in the United States came through multiple channels. Weingart gave a lecture tour on the topic in the early 1970s which increased the number of American graphic designers who traveled to the Basel School for postgraduate training which they brought back to the States. Some of the prominent students from Weingart’s classes include April Greiman, Dan Friedman, and Willi Kunz (b.1943). They further developed the style, for example Dan Friedman rejected the term legibility for the broader term readability. The increase in ornamentation was further developed by William Longhauser and can be seen through the playful lettering used to display an architectural motif in an exhibition poster for Michael Graves (To see poster). Another strong contributor to the New Wave movement was the Cranbrook Academy of Art and their co-chair of graphic design, Katherine McCoy. McCoy asserted that “reading and viewing overlap and interact synergistically in order to create a holistic effect that features both modes of interpretation.”

The complexity of composition increased with the New Wave which transitioned well into computer developed graphic design. Complexity came to define the new digital aesthetic in graphic design. April Greiman was one of the first graphic designers to embrace computers and the New Wave aesthetic is still visible in her digital works.

== Important figures ==
=== Wolfgang Weingart ===
Weingart was a German graphic designer, known as the father of New Wave design. According to Weingart, he took "Swiss Typography" as his inspiration and considered himself a "typographic rebel".

Weingart began studying at the Merz Academy in Stuttgart, Germany. While there, he developed skills such as linocuts, woodblock printing, and typesetting. In 1963, Weingart moved to Basel, Switzerland and attended Basel School of Design. in 1968, he was asked to teach typography at the institution’s newly established department Weiterbildungsklasse für Grafik.

Weingart was a teacher, and taught typography. When the computer was introduced, Weingart was given the first personal Macintosh computer for his teachings.Like his colleagues, Weingart was uncertain about the new technologies. His limited use of technology can be seen is his work today.

=== Dan Friedman ===
Dan Friedman, an alumnus to Wolfgang Weingart, attended Carnegie Mellon University, and studied abroad in Ulm, Germany to get his master's degree in Graphic Design. Ulm started becoming unstable, forcing Friedman to transfer to Allgemeine Gewerbeschule, Basel in Switzerland. That is where he was instructed by Weingart. Friedman then started teaching graphic design full time at Yale in 1969.

He created projects for his students that reflect the things he was taught from his experience at Ulm and Basel. in 1972, Friedman would then go to accept another teaching job as an Assistant Professor of the Board of Study in Design at the State University of New York. Then, a year later he quit working for Yale.

=== April Greiman ===
April Greiman is a contemporary American Graphic designer. Like Weingart, She is one of the first designers to use technology in her work. She is recognized for introducing "New Wave" into the U.S.

Greiman is the Art Director for Made in Space, based in Los Angeles.

As a student, Greiman attended Kansas City Art Institute, then, in the 70's, went to Basel, Switzerland. She became a student at the Basel School of Design and was taught by Wolfgang Weingart. She then inherited the "New Wave" design style.

Currently, Greiman works at Woodbury University, School of Architecture, as an art professor.

== Origins of term ==
In terms of music, the term "New Wave" came from the late 1970's to early 1980's, inspired by the French New Wave cinema.
