= Grid (graphic design) =

Used in graphic design to guide objects

A page layout grid (shown in white lines) composed of a series of intersecting vertical and horizontal grid lines. The text (content) is not part of the grid. The text content is applied to a particular page using the grid "flush left" along the bottom sides and right-hand sides of grid lines. The same grid may be applied to multiple pages using different types of content or different styles of the same content type.

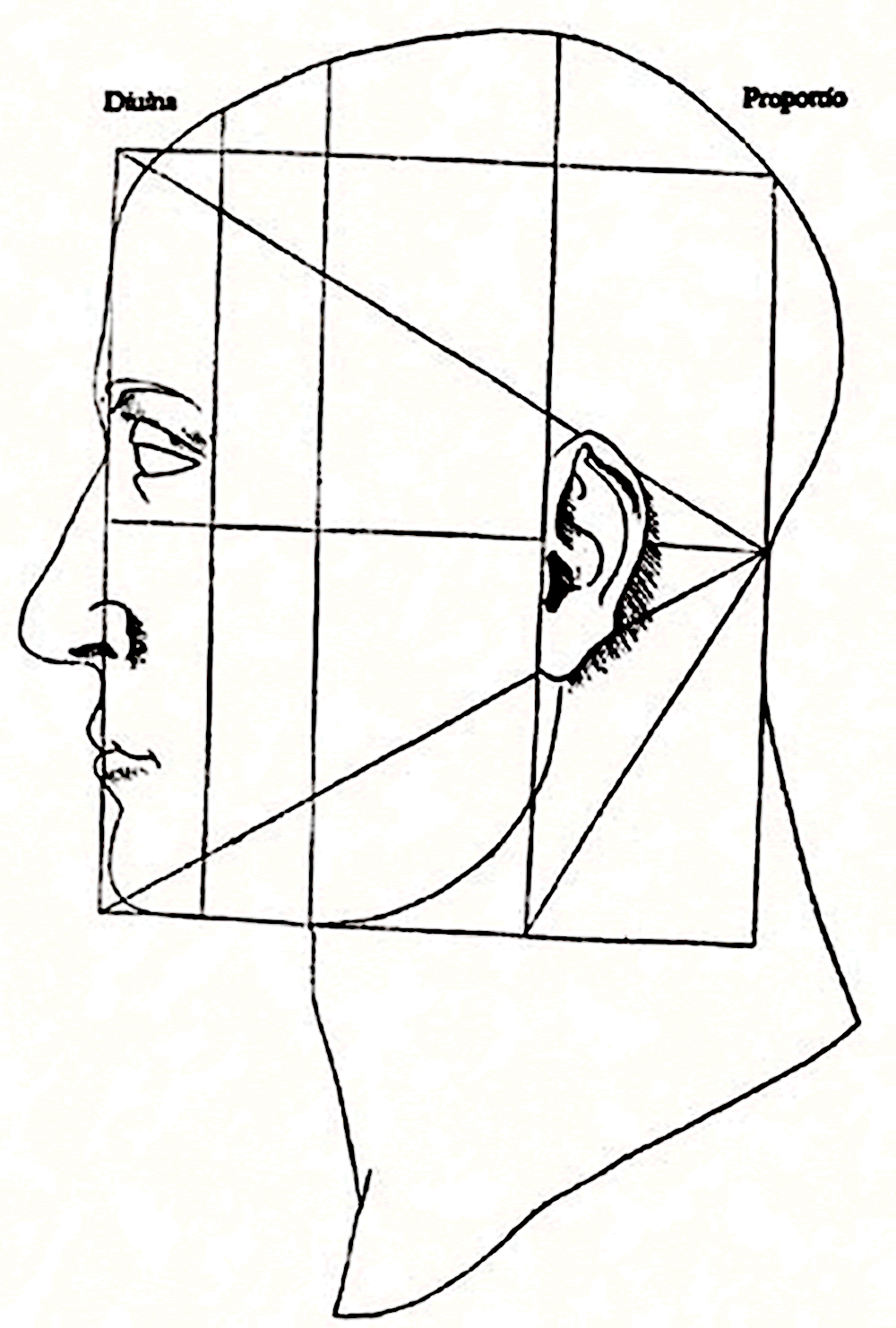
A grid applied within an image (instead of a page) using additional angular lines to guide proportions.

In graphic design, a grid is a structure (usually two-dimensional) made up of a series of intersecting straight (vertical, horizontal, and angular) or curved lines (grid lines) used to structure content. The grid serves as an armature or framework on which a designer can organize graphic elements (images, glyphs, paragraphs, etc.) in a rational, easy-to-absorb manner. A grid can be used to organize graphic elements in relation to a page, in relation to other graphic elements on the page, or relation to other parts of the same graphic element or shape.

The less-common printing term "reference grid," is an unrelated system with roots in the early days of printing.

== History ==
=== Antecedents ===
Before the invention of movable type a system based on optimal proportions had been used to arrange handwritten text on pages. One such system, known as the Villard Diagram, was in use at least since medieval times.

=== Evolution of the modern grid ===
After World War II, a number of graphic designers, including Max Bill, Emil Ruder, and Josef Müller-Brockmann, influenced by the modernist ideas of Jan Tschichold's Die neue Typographie (The New Typography), began to question the relevance of the conventional page layout of the time. They began to devise a flexible system able to help designers achieve coherence in organizing the page. The result was the modern typographic grid that became associated with the International Typographic Style. The seminal work on the subject, Grid systems in graphic design by Müller-Brockmann, helped propagate the use of the grid, first in Europe, and later in North America.

=== Reaction and reassessment ===
By the mid-1970s instruction of the typographic grid as a part of graphic design curricula had become standard in Europe, North America and much of Latin America. The graphic style of the grid was adopted as a look for corporate communication. In the early 1980s, a reaction against the entrenchment of the grid, particularly its dogmatic use, and association with corporate culture, resulted in some designers rejecting its use in favor of more organic structure. The appearance of the Apple Macintosh computer, and the resulting transition away from type being set by typographers to designers setting type themselves resulted in a wave of experimentation, much of it contrary to the precepts of Tschichold and Müller-Brockmann. The typographic grid continues to be taught today, but more as a useful tool for some projects, not as a requirement or starting point for all page design.

=== Grid use in web design ===
While grid systems have seen significant use in print media, interest from web developers has only recently seen a resurgence. Website design frameworks producing HTML and CSS had existed for a while before newer frameworks popularised the use of grid-based layouts. Some grid systems specify fixed-width elements with pixels, and some are 'fluid', meaning that they call for page element sizing to be in relative units like percentages, rather than absolute units like pixels or points.

The W3C published the CSS Grid Layout Module Level 1 to define a two-dimensional grid-based layout system.

There are also CSS frameworks that include their own grid system:

- Bootstrap
- ZURB Foundation

=== Grid use in print design ===
Print design has always used grid systems to organize and structure content. Grid systems started as helper lines for written books. Artists used grid systems to layout the content – text and images – in a manner that makes reading and absorption easier. Newspapers, books, magazines, and classifieds, etc., all use different grid systems that make the optimum use of space for better reading and presentation.

== Software ==
Most desktop publishing software and professional publishing software and other office software including word processors displays grid layout as an option.

== See also ==
- Swiss Style (design)
- International Typographic Style
