= Swiss Style (design) =

Trend in graphic design

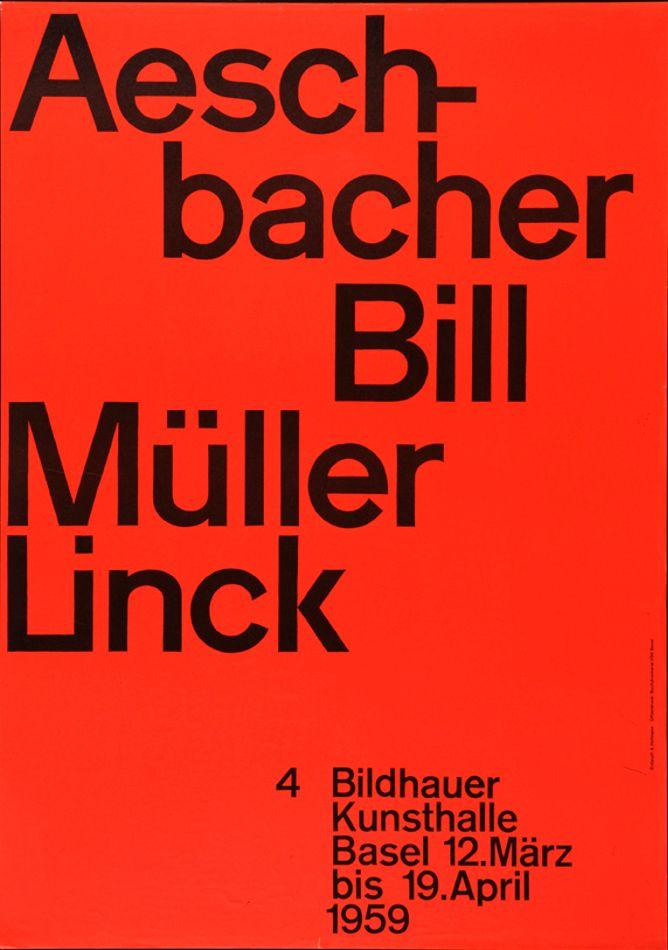
Armin Hofmann, poster for Kunsthalle Basel, 1959

Swiss style (also Swiss school or Swiss design) is a trend in graphic design, formed in the 1950s–1960s under the influence of such phenomena as the International Typographic Style, Russian Constructivism, the tradition of the Bauhaus school, the International Style, and classical modernism. The Swiss style is associated with the activities of Swiss graphic artists, but its principles spread into many other countries.

== Term ==
There is difficulty in defining the boundaries of the term "Swiss style". Due to the wide distribution of the Swiss style in different countries, it is also often identified as the international phenomenon. Sometimes this concept is confused with the term International Style, which denotes the architectural system of the 1920s – 1960s and which, in turn, is associated with the development of architectural modernism in the international space (Europe, Asia, Russia, America, etc.). The term Swiss Style is also sometimes erroneously completely identified with the concept of International Typographic Style: the Swiss school, being a continuation of the International Typographic Style, is an autonomous phenomenon. Swiss style is an independent system associated with the formation of the graphic style of the 1950s – 1960s.

== General characteristics ==
Swiss style is associated with the formation of new principles of graphic design. They were created based on graphic concepts identified by the Bauhaus school, Russian constructivism, and the International Typographic Style. The basic principles of the Swiss style include minimalist graphics, the use of a modular grid system, asymmetrical layout and sans-serif fonts. Swiss style is considered the basis of modern graphic design. In particular, it is believed that many elements of computer design (in particular, Flat Design) were formed under the influence of the Swiss style. The Swiss style is associated with the development of modern forms and the graphic basis of corporate identity.

== Swiss style and its prototypes ==
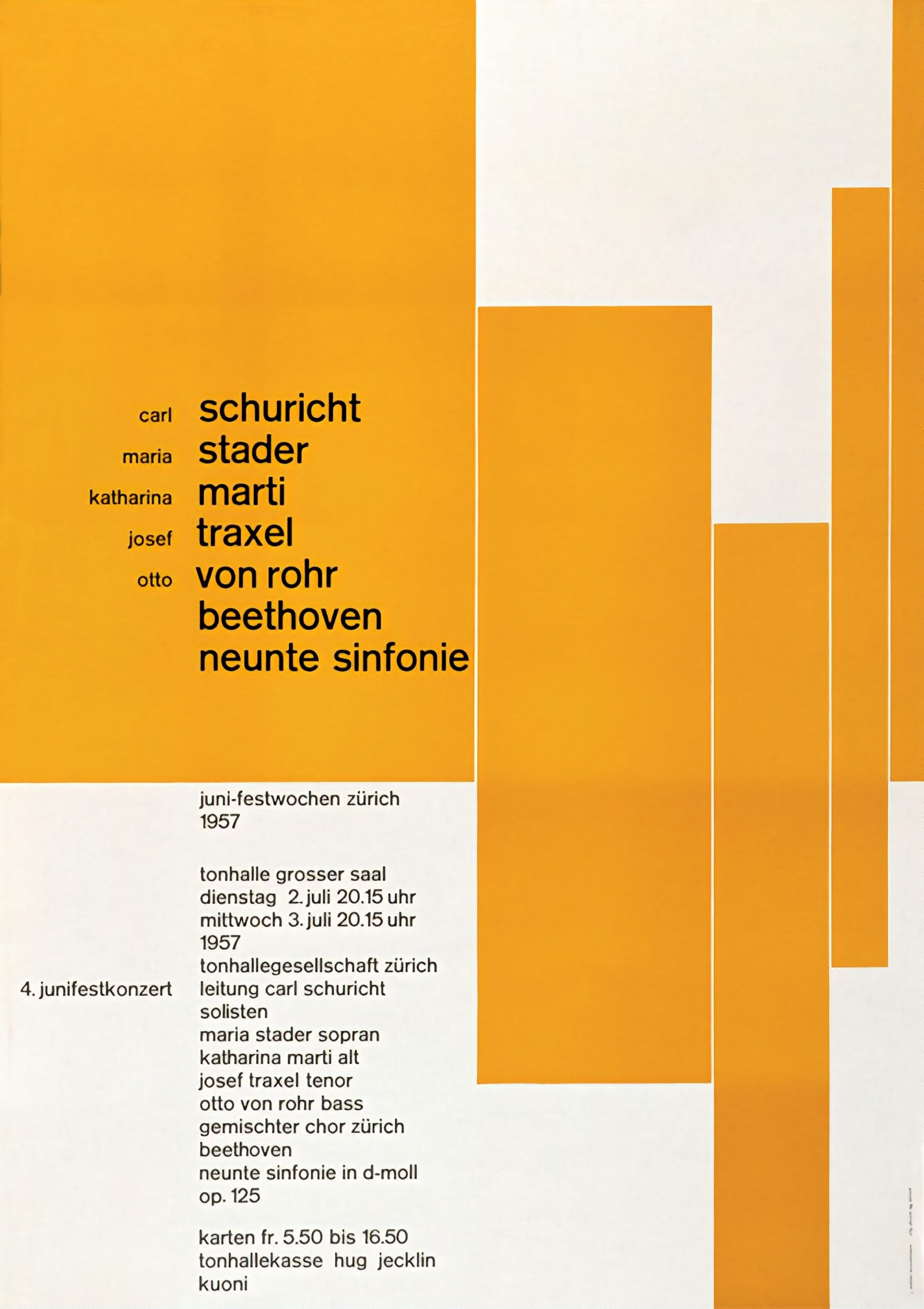
Josef Müller-Brockmann, poster, 1957

The development of the Swiss style is associated with the formation of new principles in graphic design and is correlated with a number of prototypes, in particular, such as De Stijl, Russian constructivism, the Bauhaus school, International Typographic Style, etc. Ernst Keller had a fundamental influence on the development of the Swiss school. Having started teaching at the School of Applied Sciences in Zürich in 1918, he outlined the basic principles of the future Swiss School, and also contributed to the formation of a whole generation of graphic designers. The masters trained by Keller formed the basis of the Swiss school of graphic design. One of Keller's students was Josef Müller-Brockmann, who perfected the modular grid system and made it the basis of both the Swiss style and modern graphic design.

=== Arts and Crafts Movement ===
The idea of reform of applied graphics was outlined within the Arts and Crafts movement. Applied arts in general and applied graphics in particular were presented as the most important elements of the artistic system. The Swiss school used little or no stylistic elements of the Arts and Crafts Movement. However, the idea of new graphics, which first formed the basis of the International Typographic Style and then the Swiss Style, is associated with the Arts and Crafts Movement.

=== Werkbunds: Germany and Switzerland ===
Founded in 1907, the Deutscher Werkbund was focused on the development of industrial arts and crafts. In 1913, on the initiative of Henry van de Velde, the Swiss Werkbund was founded, the purpose of which was to spread the ideas of new art and craft in Switzerland. The industrial basis and focus on functional applied forms proposed by the German and Swiss Werkbunds influenced the formation of the functional concept of the Swiss style.

=== Art education reform ===
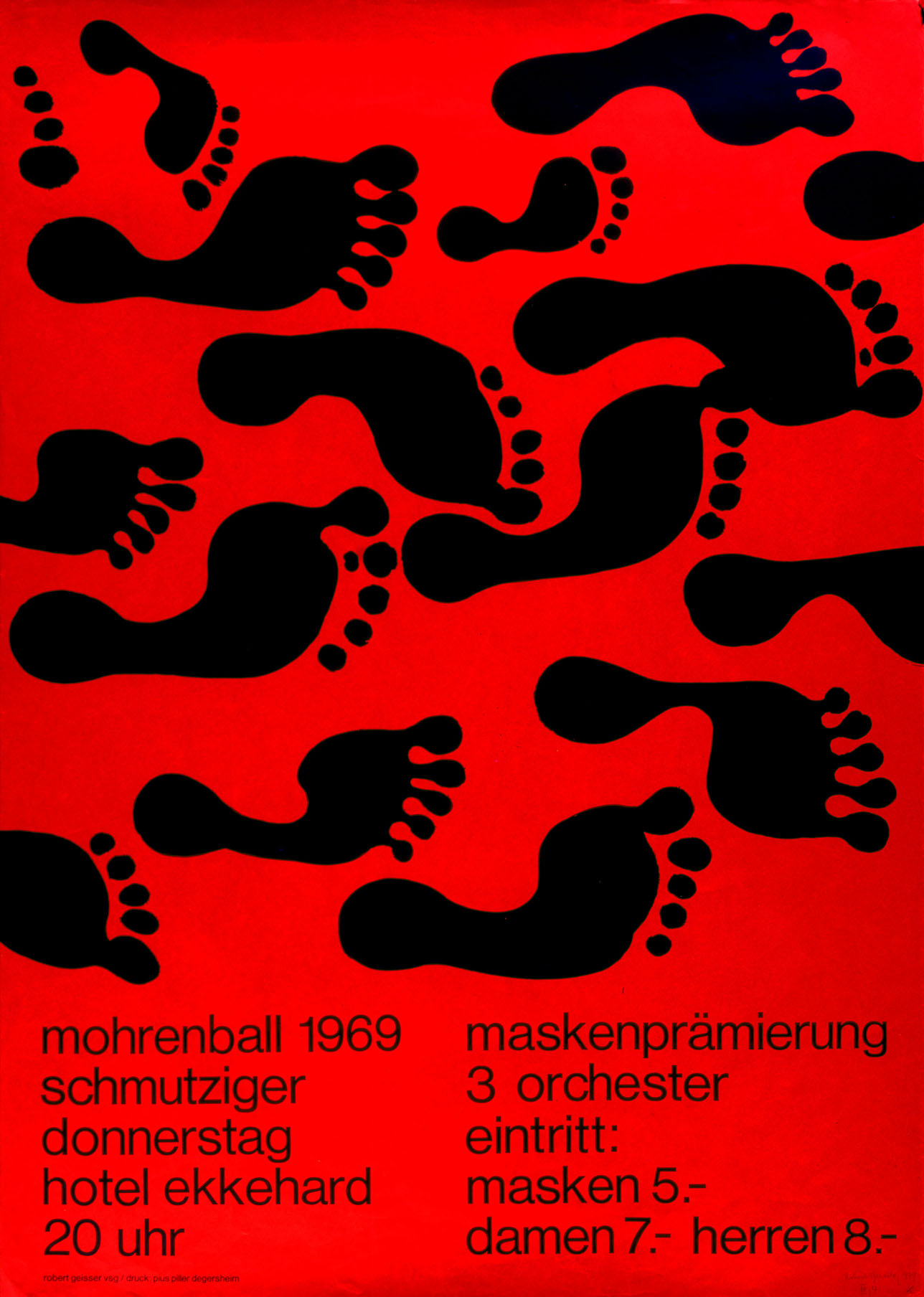
Robert Geisser, poster, 1969

The development of the Swiss school is associated not only with the development of industrial ideas, but also with the reform of art education in Switzerland. These changes affected the curricula of schools in Zürich and Basel (Schule für Gestaltung Basel). Transformations in this area are associated with the name of Julius de Pretere, a Belgian artist and graphic artist, who in 1906 was appointed the new rector of the School of Applied Arts in Zürich. De Preteret's reforms and course changes he introduced in 1908 reorganized design education. The new art education focused less on classical art forms and relied more on the possibilities of industrial design.

=== Ernst Keller ===
In 1918, Ernst Keller began teaching at the School of Applied Arts in Zürich (the school itself was founded in 1878). Keller developed a course in graphic design and typography. In his works, Keller used simple geometric shapes, intense colors, based on fundamentally simple graphic solutions. These techniques will subsequently be used by masters of the Swiss school. Keller shaped many future principles of Swiss design.

=== Constructivism, De Stijl, Bauhaus ===
New art movements such as Constructivism, De Stijl, and Bauhaus marked the future visual program of the Swiss style. Graphic elements formed within the framework of Russian Constructivism, the De Stijl movement, and the Bauhaus artistic tradition formed the basis of the Swiss style.

=== International typographic style ===
An important basis for the future of the Swiss style was the development of the International Typographic Style in the 1920s and 1930s. In 1928, the book "New Typography" was published, written by the German designer and graphic artist Jan Tschichold. "New Typography" outlined the basic principles of the International Typographic Style, the techniques, ideology, and principles of which were the basis of the Swiss style.

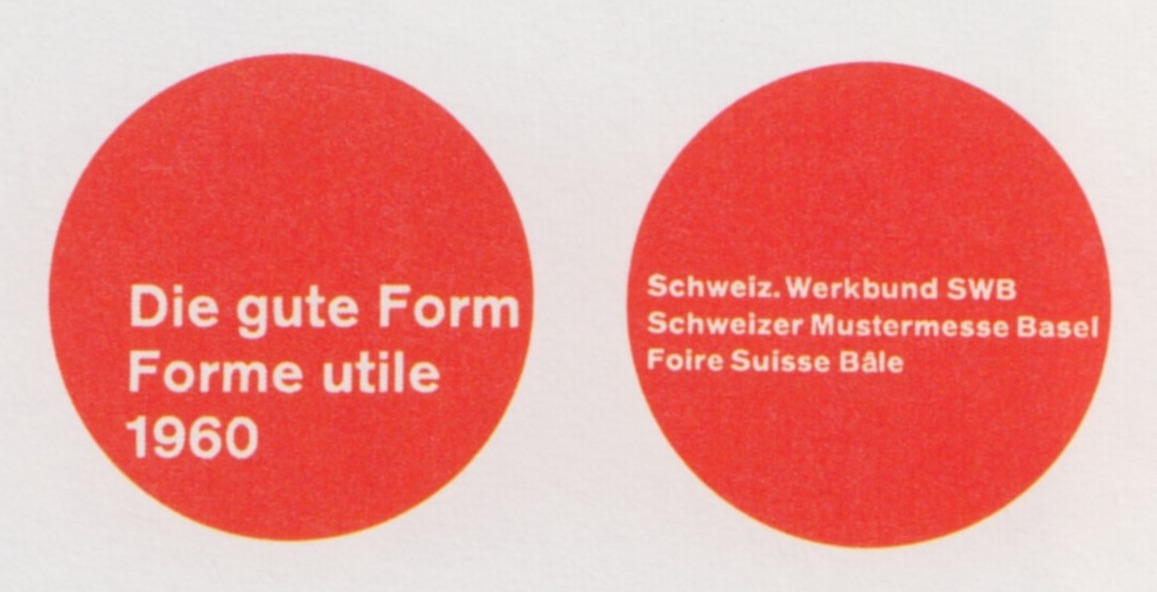
Emil Ruder: «Die gute Form», exhibition, 1956.

== Style features ==
Many of the principles developed within the Swiss style were outlined within the International Typographic Style. Swiss graphics used these principles as a basic platform, but reworked them into a new, streamlined style. The principles of the International Typographic Style were refined within the framework of Swiss design. These basic principles include techniques such as the use of modular grids, asymmetrical layout, choosing simple sans-serif fonts, left alignment, and white space on the page.

=== Using the grid system ===
The idea of a modular grid arose at the beginning of the 20th century and was adjusted within the framework of the International Typographic Style in the 1920s and 1930s. The classic understanding of the modular system was formulated in the works of Josef Müller-Brockmann – most notably in the book The Grid System in Graphic Design. Improved by Swiss designers, the modular grid is considered the basis of the Swiss style and a key element of modern graphic design.

=== Simple fonts ===
A recognizable feature of the Swiss style was the use of simple fonts – that is, sans-serif fonts. Simple fonts were used as a minimalist component and formed an alternative to the old serifs antiqua common in 19th-century printing. Simple fonts made it possible to create a new style that was considered not only practical, but also modern. One of the most famous typefaces was Helvetica, developed in 1957 by the Swiss typographer Max Miedinger with the participation of Eduard Hoffmann. The use of simple fonts became a distinctive feature of the Swiss school and a marker of new design.

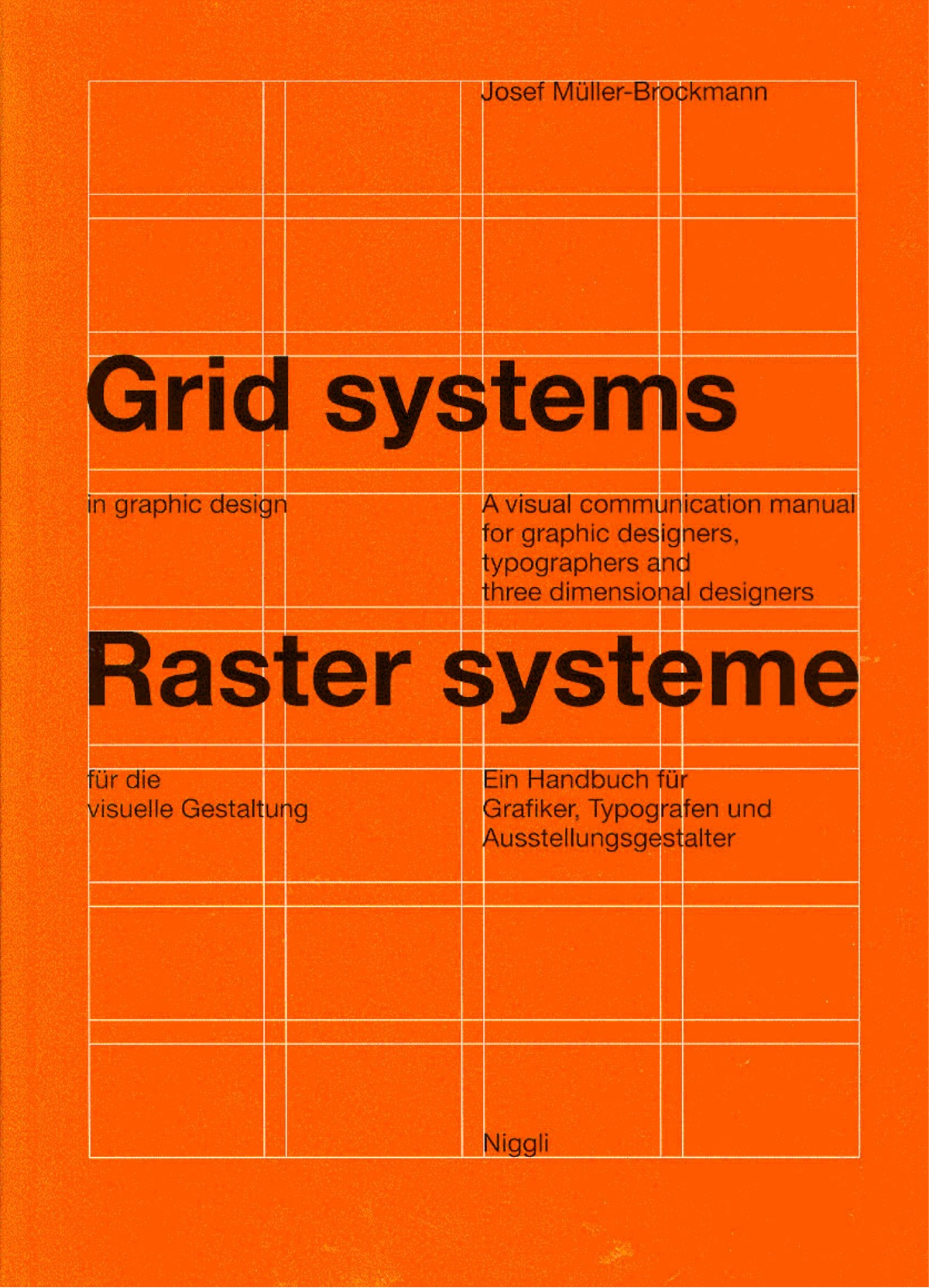
Josef Müller-Brockmann: «„Grid Systems in Graphic Design"», 1981.

=== Asymmetrical arrangement of elements ===
Asymmetrical layout was inherited by the Swiss school from the tradition of the International Typographic Style. Originating in the 1920s, the tradition of asymmetrical text layout became fundamental in Swiss graphic design. The Swiss school made asymmetry the basis of the graphic style, improving the techniques of asymmetrical layout and creating its stable standard.

=== Using empty space ===
The use of empty space is another technique inherited from the Swiss School in the tradition of the International Typographic Style. The free space was intended to create a better sense of balance within the design. The use of empty space in the tradition of the Swiss school has become the basis of modern graphic minimalism.

=== Left alignment ===
Left alignment is one of the central techniques of the Swiss school. This technique was used within the framework of the International Typographic Style, as well as in the graphic systems of Russian constructivism and the Bauhaus tradition. In the system of the Swiss school, this technique became fundamental, practically displacing other principles of layout.

== Main stages ==
=== First half of the 20th century: Ernst Keller and the education system ===
The development of the Swiss school and the Swiss style was directly related to the development of the art education system in Switzerland. Swiss design developed within educational institutions. This stage in the development of the Swiss style is associated with the name of Ernst Keller, who taught at the School of Applied Arts in Zürich from 1918. Keller formed the basic principles of the Swiss school. These principles would later be used by his students, in particular by Josef Müller-Brockmann. The activities of Ernst Keller are considered an early stage in the formation and development of the Swiss school.

=== Working with fonts: 1950s ===
The 1950s saw a distillation of elements of the Swiss style. The basis for the formation of a new classical system was the creation of new fonts, primarily simple sans-serif typefaces. This process was supported by Max Miedinger and his colleague Eduard Hoffmann. Notably, the font "Neue Haas Grotesque" was developed, which was later renamed "Helvetica" – "Swiss font". Helvetica is used often for its simplicity.

=== Classic period: 1950s – 1960s ===
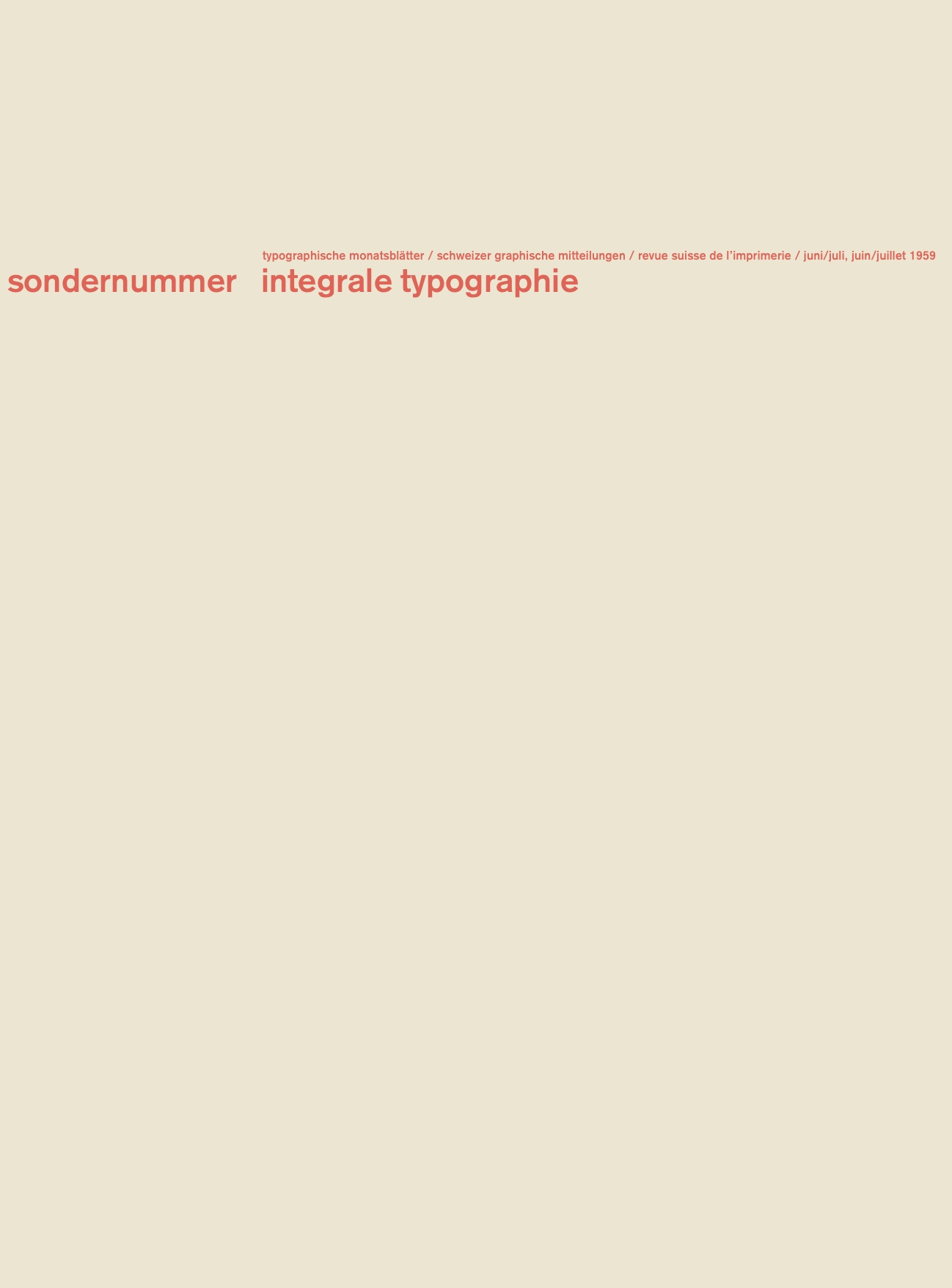
Emil Ruder: Typographische Monatsblätter, 1959, no. 6.

The period of the 1950s – 1960s is considered to be the classic period in the history of Swiss style. The activities of the main masters of the Swiss school – such as Armin Hofmann, Josef Müller-Brockmann, and Emil Ruder – are associated with this period. During this period, the concept of the Swiss style was formed as an established canonical system. The formation of the main texts and theoretical programs of the Swiss School is associated with this period – the theoretical works of Armin Hofmann, Emil Ruder and Joseph Müller-Brockmann were created. During this period, magazines were published that supported the spread and recognition of the Swiss style. Since 1946, the magazine Typografische Monatsblätter has become one of the tools for disseminating modernism and the Swiss style. From 1958 to 1965, the Neue Grafik magazine was published, which defined the principles, basis and character of the Swiss style. Its editors were influential designers who played a key role in the development of Swiss style. The magazine's graphics were based on the consistent use of elements of the Swiss school. Neue Grafik helped spread the new style outside of Switzerland. One of the editors, Joseph Müller-Brockmann, "sought an absolute and universal form of graphic expression through objective presentation, communicating with the audience without the interference of the designer's subjective feelings or propaganda techniques of persuasion."

=== National schools and corporate style: 1970s ===
It is generally accepted that the universal nature of Swiss graphics had a fundamental influence on the formation of corporate identity. The Swiss style was the basis for the style of large corporations. After World War II, the Swiss style was used by large corporations and official institutions in the United States. Large corporations have used the Swiss style as a basis, focusing on its simplicity and intuitive understanding across cultures. The Swiss Style became noticeably widespread in the United States (primarily as the style of large corporations), and was also the basis of the Japanese school of graphic design, where the Swiss Style was used as a universal communication tool.

== Importance and influence ==
Karl Gerstner: Swissair logo, 1978.

Swiss style is considered one of the most large-scale phenomena in graphic design. In fact, the Swiss school defined the basic principles and appearance of the modern graphics system. The Swiss style was used as the main tool in shaping the principles of corporate identity in various areas. Also, the Swiss style contributed to the development and spread of minimalism as a mass artistic doctrine. It is believed that it was the Swiss style that formed the basis of the modern computer design system, in particular Flat Design.

== See also ==
- International style (architecture)
- Helvetica
- Armin Hofmann
- Josef Müller-Brockmann
- Emil Ruder
- International Typographic Style

== Sources ==
- Hofmann A. Graphic Design Manual: Principles and Practice. New York: Reinhold Publishing, 1965. 172 p.
- Müller-Brockmann J. Gestaltungsprobleme des Grafikers. Teufen: Verlag Arthur Niggli, 1961. 186 s.
- Müller-Brockmann J. Geschichte der visuellen Kommunikation. Teufen: Verlag Arthur Niggli, 1971. 334 s.
- Müller-Brockmann J. Grid systems in graphic design / Rastersysteme für die visuelle Gestaltung. Teufen: Verlag Arthur Niggli, 1981. 162 s.
- Ruder E. Typography: A Manual of Design. Teufen: Verlag Arthur Niggli, 1967. 274 p.
