= Armin Hofmann =

Swiss graphic designer and educator (1920–2020)

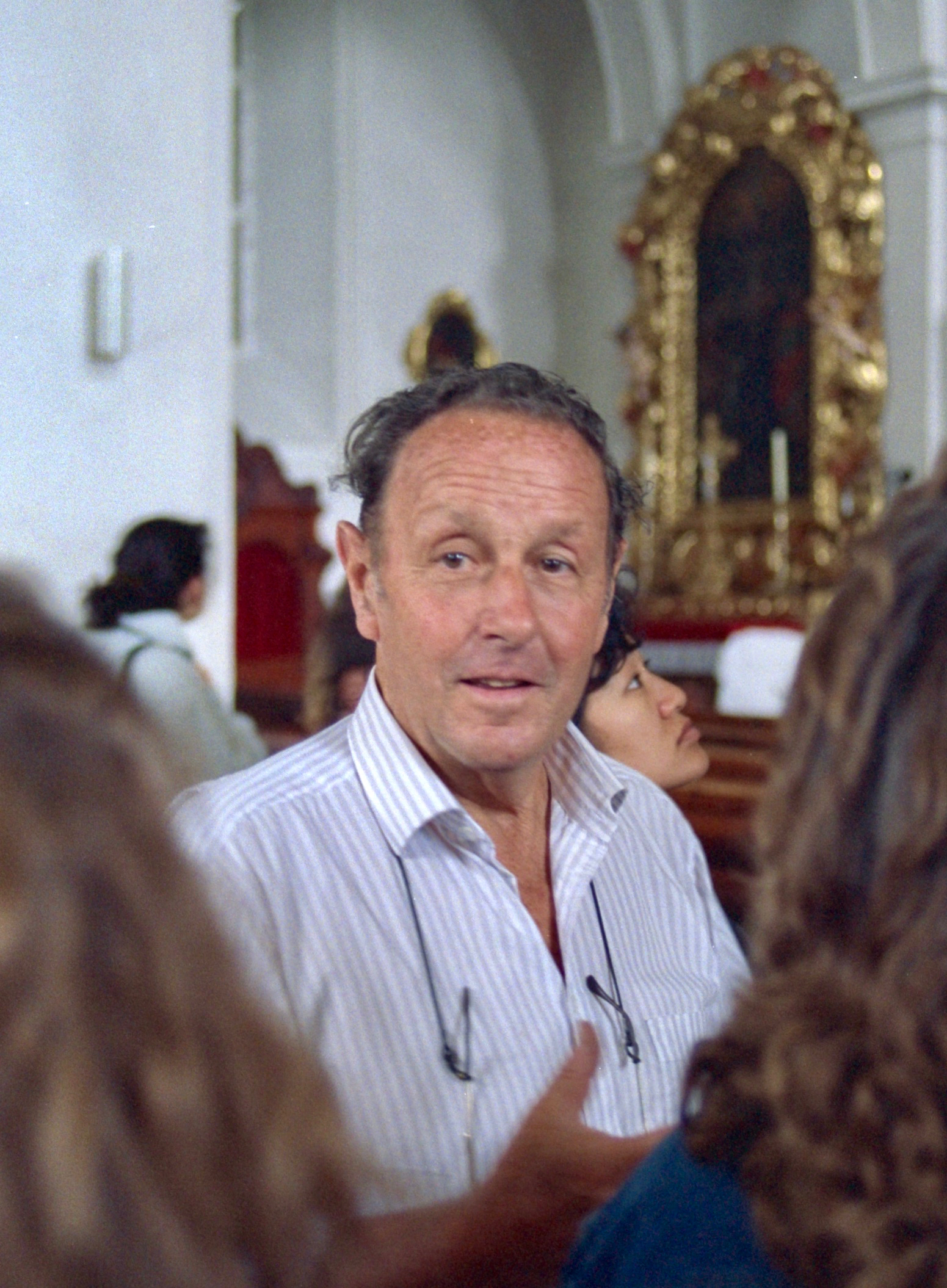
- Hofmann at a summer design program at Disentis Abbey in Switzerland (1989)
- Born: 29 June 1920; Winterthur, Switzerland
- Died: 18 December 2020 (aged 100); Lucerne, Switzerland
- Known for: Graphic designer, educator, author

Armin Hofmann (HonRDI) (29 June 1920 – 18 December 2020) was a Swiss graphic designer and design educator, considered one of the most influential figures of Swiss design. Through a regular visiting professorship at Yale University School of Art in 1960–80s, Hofmann introduced the Swiss design style to the United States.

== Biography ==
Armin Hofmann was born on 29 June 1920 in Winterthur. After graduating from School of Arts and Crafts in Zurich, he worked as a lithographer in Basel and Bern.

Hofmann began his career in 1947 as a teacher at the Allgemeine Gewerbeschule Basel School of Art and Crafts at the age of twenty-six. Hofmann followed Emil Ruder as head of the graphic design department at the Schule für Gestaltung Basel (Basel School of Design) and was instrumental in developing the graphic design style known as the Swiss Style. His teaching methods were unorthodox and diverse, and set new educational standards that became widely known in design institutions throughout the world.

In addition to his position at Basel School of Design, Hofmann taught workshops in graphic design at Yale University School of Art and the Philadelphia Museum School of Art. His notable students include April Greiman, Wolfgang Weingart, Steff Geissbühler, and Inge Druckrey.

Hofmann retired from teaching at Basel School of Design in 1986 and resigned from his position at Yale in 1991 in response to the appointment of postmodernist designer Sheila Levrant de Bretteville as the director of the school's graphic design program.

Hofmann died on 18 December 2020 at the age of 100 in Lucerne, where he lived with his wife Dorothea Hofmann-Schmid.

== Influence ==
Hofmann's insights as an educator, combined with his visual expression, created a varied body of work that included books, exhibitions, stage sets, logotypes, symbols, typography, posters, sign systems, and environmental graphics. His work is recognized for its reliance on the fundamental elements of graphic form – point, line, and shape – while subtly conveying simplicity, complexity, representation, and abstraction, building on ideas originating in Russia, Germany and The Netherlands in the 1920s, alongside avant-garde art and International Style in architecture.

Hofmann was well known for his poster designs, which rejected ornamentation and emphasized economical use of shape, fonts, and colour, in reaction to what Hofmann regarded as the "trivialization of colour." Hofmann's most highly acclaimed posters are for Kunsthalle Basel. His works have been exhibited at major museums, such as the New York Museum of Modern Art.

In 1965 he wrote the Graphic Design Manual: Principles and Practice, an influential textbook in the field. It helped popularize the principles of Swiss design in the United States and worldwide.

Posters designed by Armin Hofmann
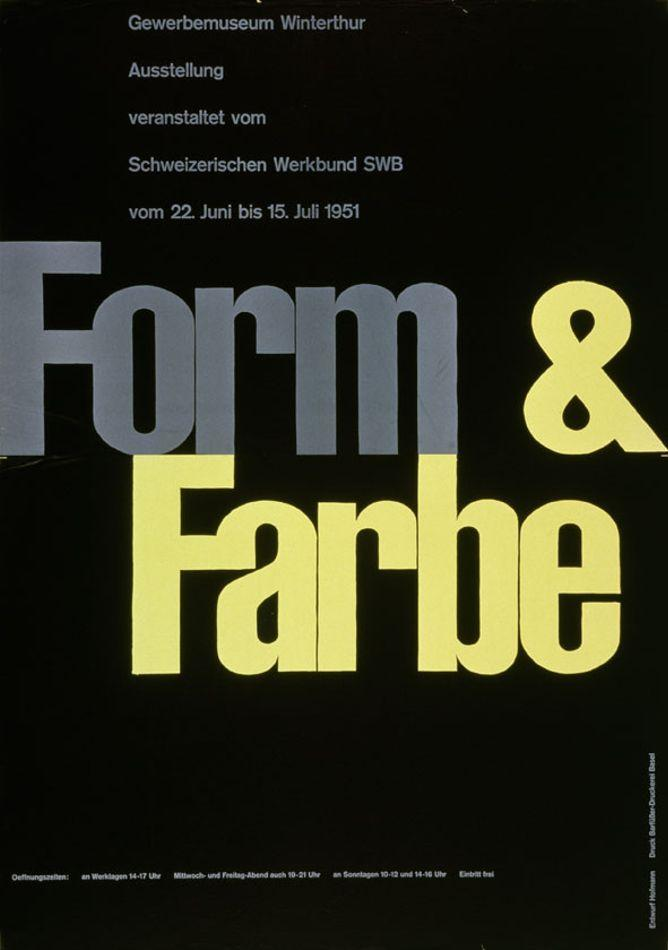
Exhibition poster for the Gewerbemuseum Winterthur, 1951

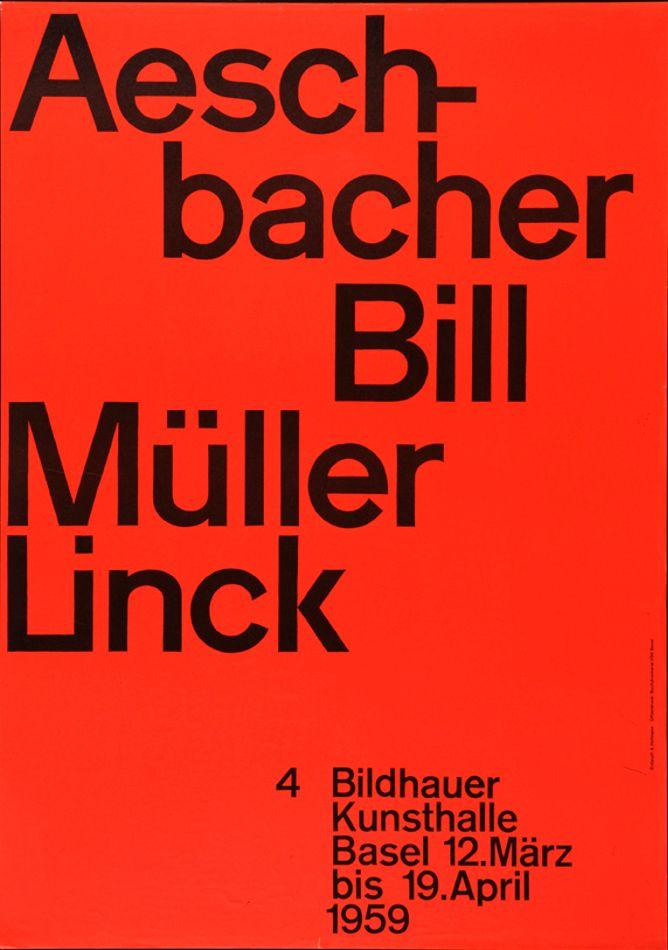
Exhibition poster for the Kunsthalle Basel, 1959

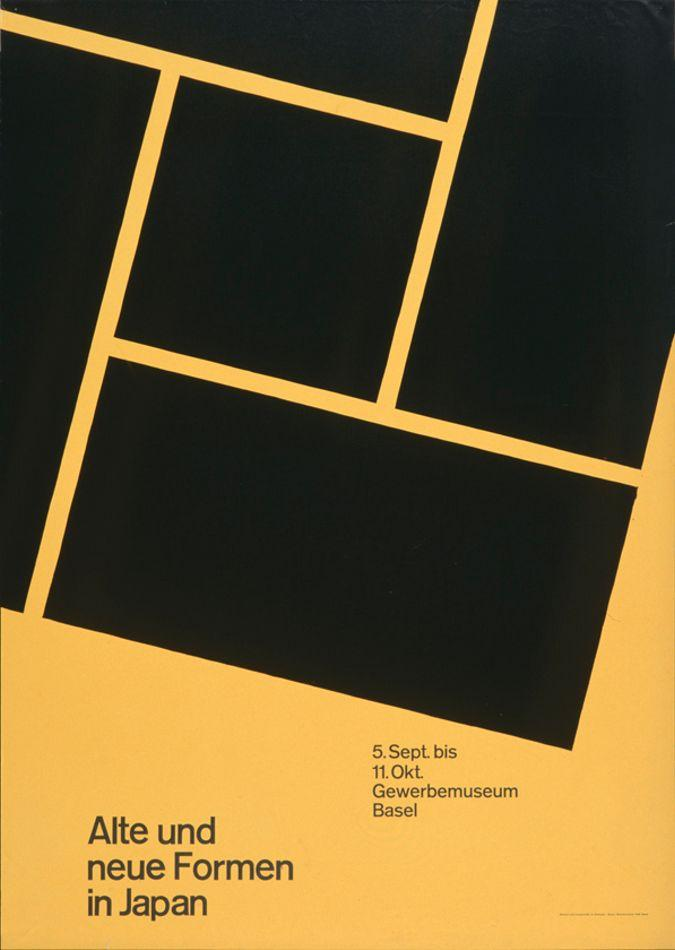
Exhibition poster for the Gewerbemuseum Basel, 1959

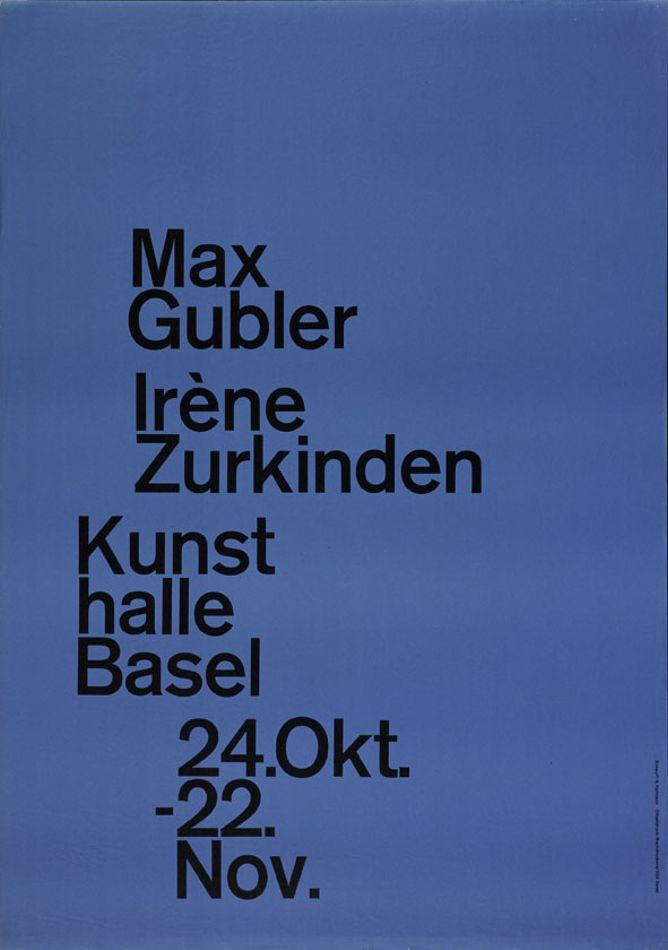
Exhibition poster for the Kunsthalle Basel, 1959

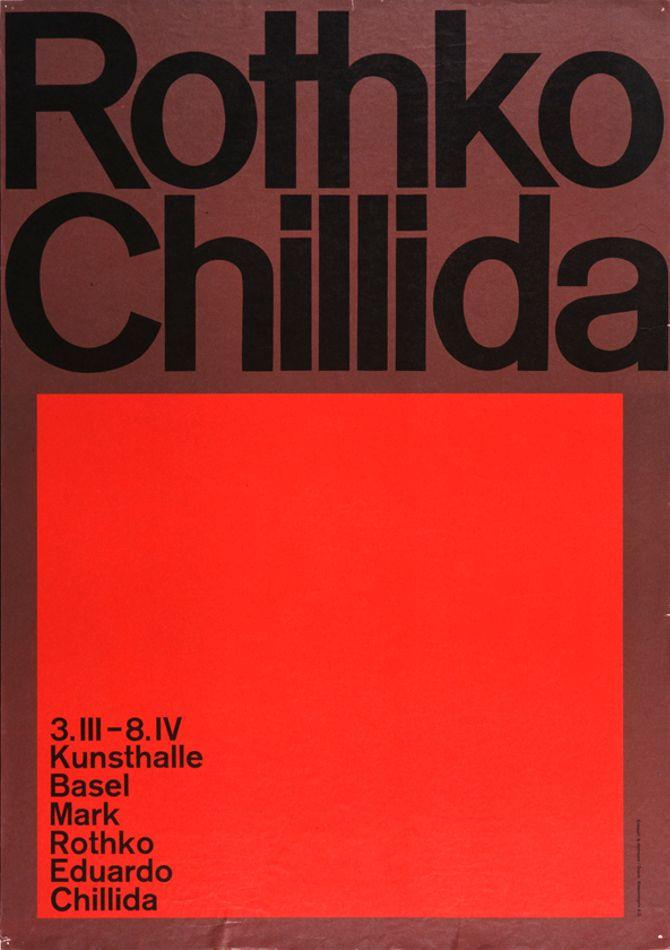
Exhibition poster for the Kunsthalle Basel, 1962

== See also ==
- Swiss Style (design)
- International Typographic Style
