= Wolfgang Weingart =

German graphic designer (1941–2021)

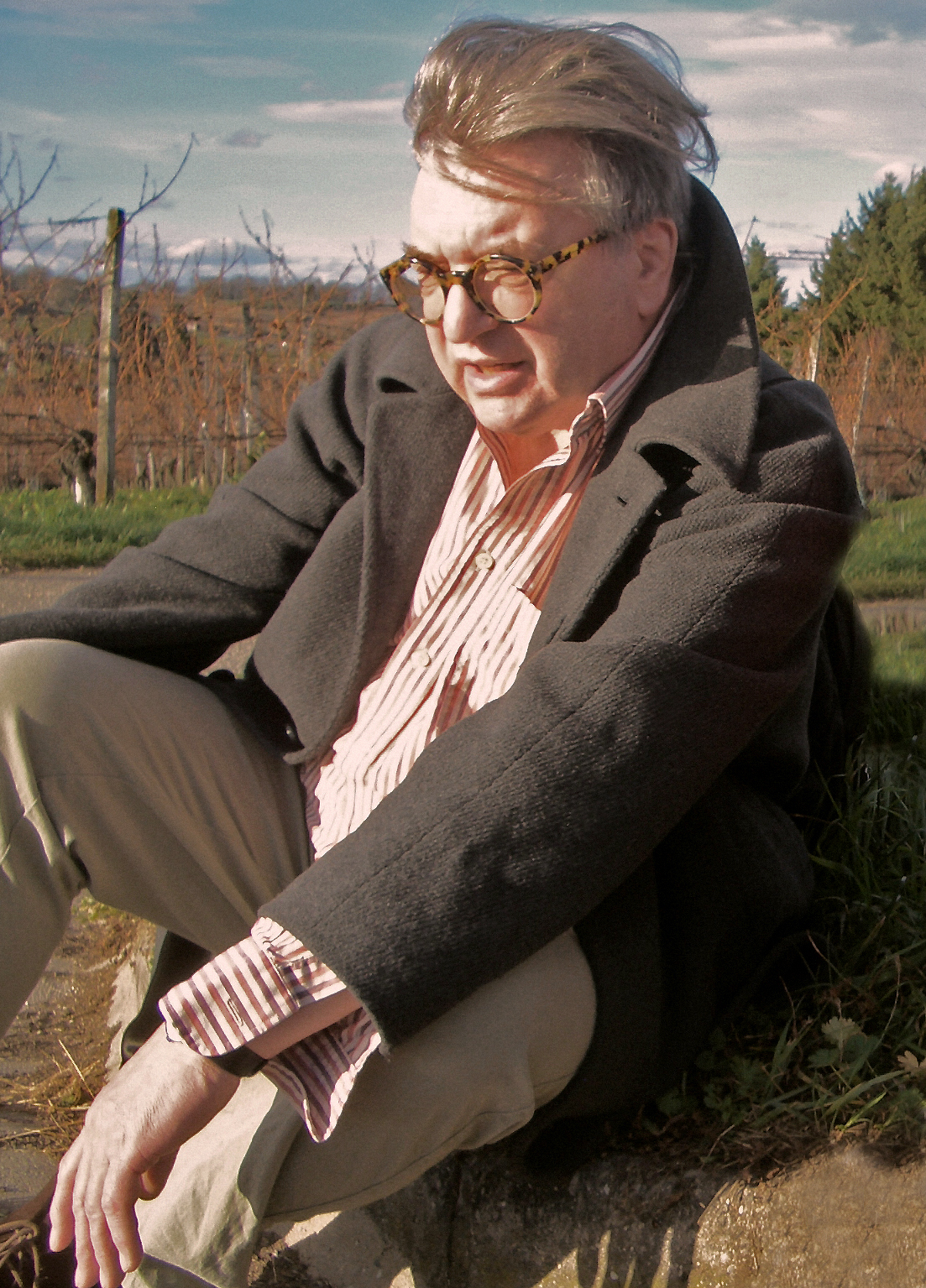
- Wolfgang Weingart in the vineyards of Tüllingen, Germany, 2011
- Born: Wolfgang Weingart; 6 February 1941; Salem Valley, Germany
- Died: 12 July 2021 (aged 80); Basel, Switzerland
- Known for: Typography and Graphic Design
- Movement: New Wave and Swiss Punk typography

Wolfgang Weingart (6 February 1941 – 12 July 2021) was an internationally known graphic designer and typographer. His work was categorized as Swiss typography and he was credited as "the father" of New Wave or Swiss Punk typography.

== Childhood ==
Weingart was born near the Swiss border of Germany, in the Salem Valley, in 1941. He lived near Lake Constance for about thirteen years and spent his childhood in Germany, moving to Lisbon in 1954 with his family.

== Education ==
In April 1958 he returned to Germany and began his studies at the Merz Academy in Stuttgart, where he attended a two-year program in applied graphic arts. He learned typesetting, linocut and woodblock printing.

Weingart then completed a three-year typesetting apprenticeship in hot metal hand composition at Ruwe Printing. There he was introduced to the company’s consulting designer, Karl-August Hanke, who became his mentor and encouraged him to study in Switzerland.

== Teaching and work ==
Weingart met Emil Ruder and Armin Hofmann in Basel in 1963 and moved there the following year, enrolling as an independent student at the Schule für Gestaltung Basel (Basel School of Design). In 1968, he was invited to teach typography at the institution’s newly established Kunstgewerbeschule where Hofmann taught. The designers that surrounded Hofmann were not as focused on using Swiss-style principles in application to their work. These stylistic choices proved to be a great influence on Weingart, who was one of the first designers to abandon these strict principles that controlled Swiss design for decades. As he later wrote, “When I began teaching in 1968, classical, so-called 'Swiss typography' (dating from the 1950s), was still commonly practiced by designers throughout Switzerland and at our school. Its conservative design dogma and strict limitations stifled my playful, inquisitive, experimental temperament and I reacted strongly against it. Yet at the same time I recognized too many good qualities in Swiss typography to renounce it altogether. Through my teaching I set out to use the positive qualities of Swiss typography as a base from which to pursue radically new typographic frontiers.” Between 1974 and 1996, at Hofmann’s invitation, Weingart taught at the Yale Summer Program in Graphic Design in Brissago, Switzerland. For over forty years he lectured and taught extensively in Europe, North and South America, Japan, Australia and New Zealand.

According to Weingart, "I took 'Swiss Typography' as my starting point, but then I blew it apart, never forcing any style upon my students. I never intended to create a 'style'. It just happened that the students picked up—and misinterpreted—a so-called 'Weingart style' and spread it around."

In 2014, the Museum of Design in Zurich presented a retrospective of Weingart’s work. Weingart: Typography was the first exhibition in Switzerland which featured his personal work as well as results from his teaching.

== Awards and affiliations ==
He was a member of the Alliance Graphique Internationale (AGI) from 1978 to 1999, and served on the editorial board of Typographische Monatsblätter magazine from 1970 to 1988. In 2005 he was awarded the honorary title of Doctor of Fine Arts from MassArt. In 2013 he was a recipient of the AIGA Medal, the highest honor of the design profession in the U.S., for his typographic explorations and teaching. In 2014 Weingart received the Swiss Grand Prix of Design award, presented by the Federal Office of Culture for his lifelong merits as a designer.

== Publications ==
- Weingart, Wolfgang. Weingart: Typography –– My Way to Typography, a retrospective volume in ten sections, Baden: Lars Müller Publishers, 2000 (ISBN 978-3907044865)
- Knapp, Susan, Eppelheimer, Michael, Hofmann Dorothea et al. Weingart: The Man and the Machine, statements by 77 of his students at the Basel School of Design (1968–2004), Basel: Karo Publishing, 2014 (ISBN 3-9521009-7-8)
