= Josef Müller-Brockmann =

Swiss graphic designer

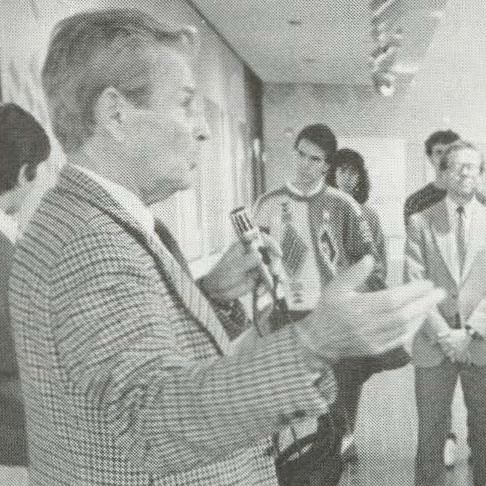
- Müller-Brockmann speaking with Rochester Institute of Technology students in 1987
- Born: Josef Müller; 9 May 1914; Rapperswil, Switzerland
- Died: 30 August 1996 (aged 82); Unterengstringen, Switzerland
- Education: University of Zurich
- Occupations: Graphic designer; educator; author
- Years active: 1936–1996
- Style: International Typographic Style
- Spouse(s): Verena Brockmann (married 1943–1964), Shizuko Yoshikawa (married 1967–1996)
- Children: 1

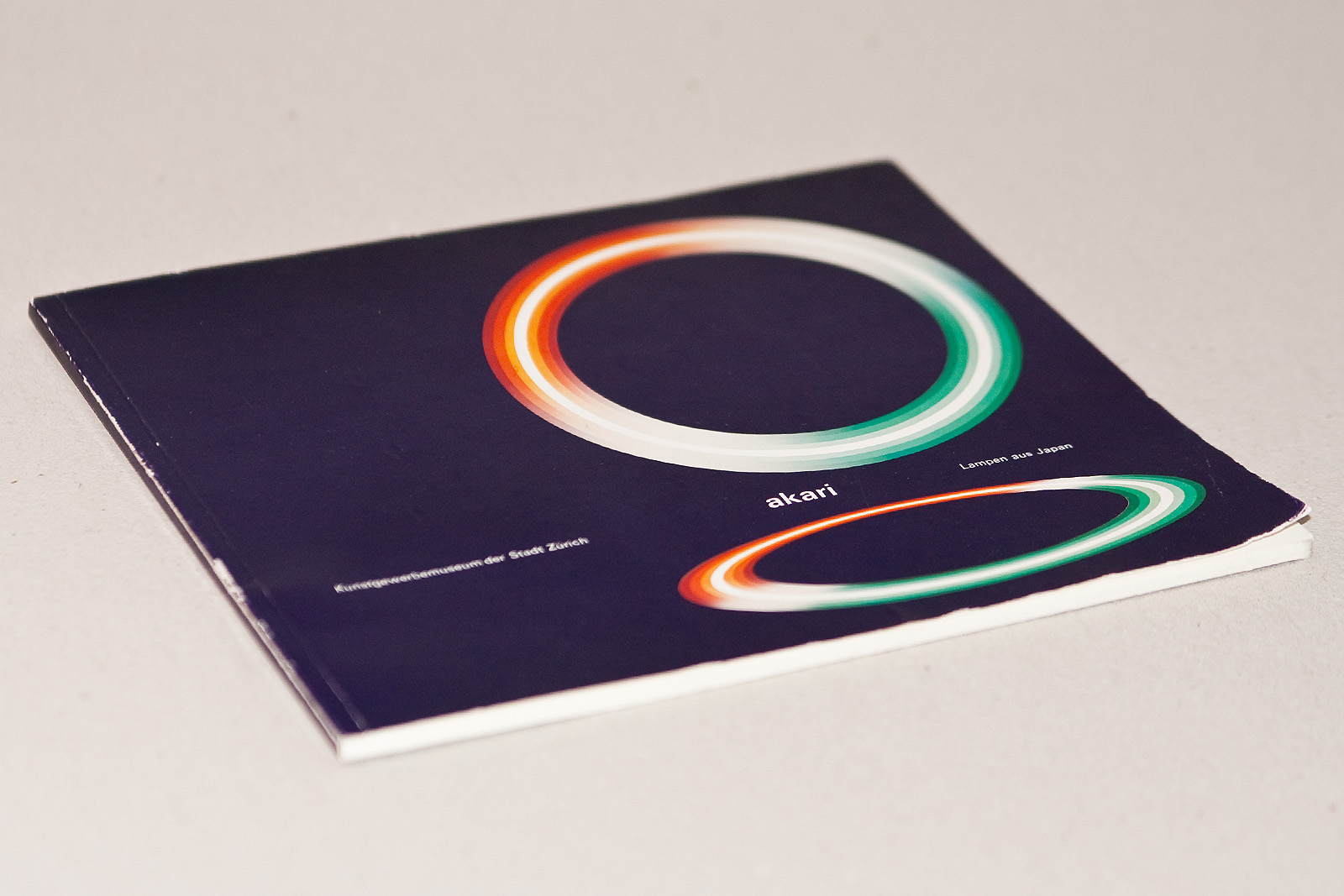
Akari catalogue designed by Müller-Brockmann (1975)

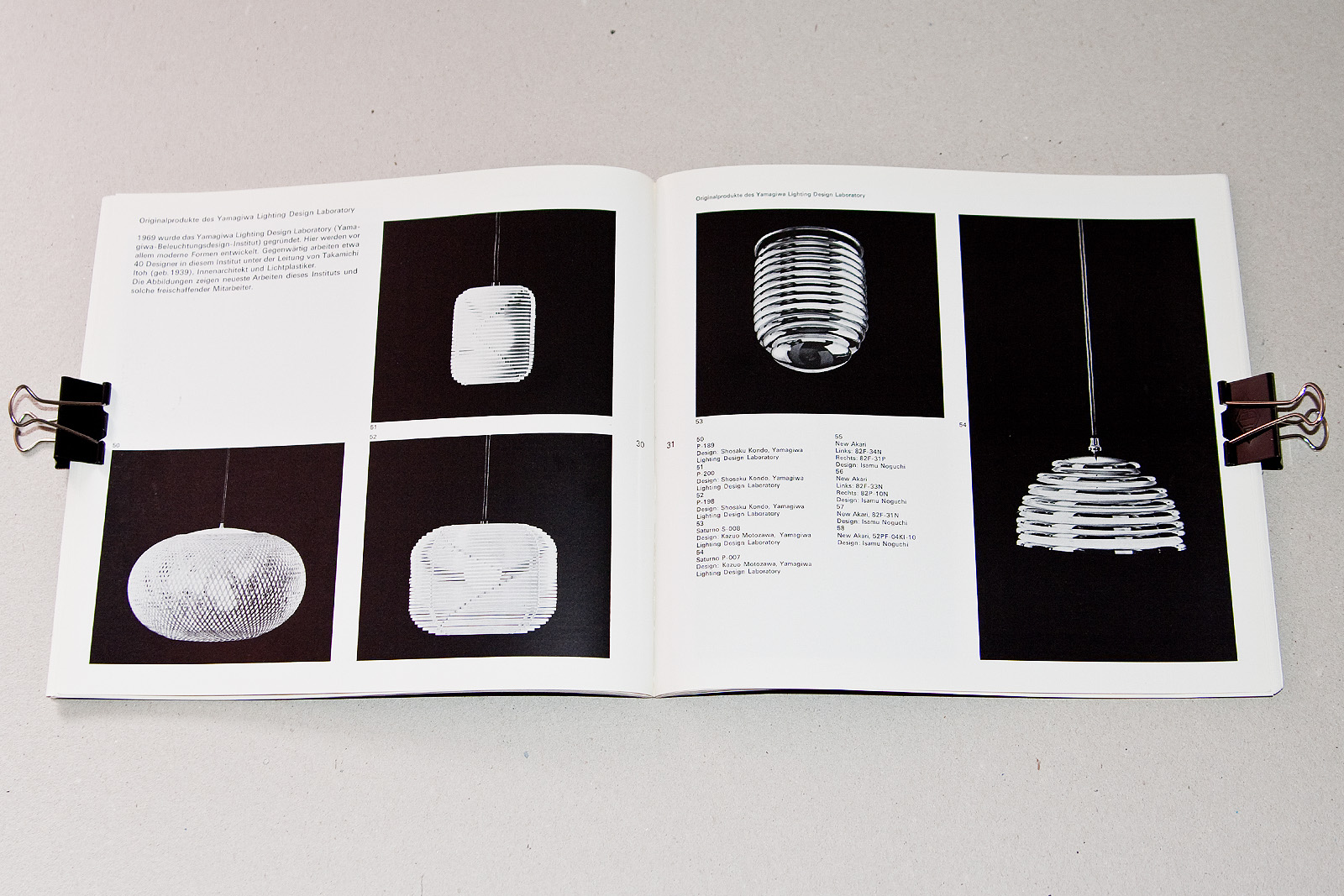
Akari catalogue interior layout depicting Isamu Noguchi's Light Sculptures (1975)

Josef Müller-Brockmann (9 May 1914 – 30 August 1996) was a Swiss graphic designer, author, and educator, he was a Principal at Muller-Brockmann & Co. design firm. He was a pioneer of the International Typographic Style. One of the main masters of Swiss design. Müller-Brockmann is recognized for his simple designs and his clean use of typography, shapes and colors which inspire many graphic designers in the 21st century.

== Early life and education ==
Josef Müller was born May 9, 1914, in Rapperswil, Switzerland. He studied architecture, design and art history at both the University of Zurich at Gewerbeschule, and Zurich University of the Arts (also known as Kunstgewerbeschule Zürich), where he studied with Ernst Keller and Alfred Willimann.

He apprenticed in design and advertising with Walter Diggelman. In 1936, he opened his Zürich design studio specializing in graphic design, exhibition design, and photography. In 1937, he joined the Swiss Werkbund (Swiss Association of Artists and Designers). His favorite typeface to use was Akzidenz-Grotesk.

== Career ==
During the 1950s, Müller-Brockmann explored nonrepresentational abstraction, visual metaphor, subjective graphical representation, and constructive graphic design. He used shapes and other geometric elements to express his work, without illustration or embellishments.

In 1950, he produced his first of many concert posters for the Tonhalle concert hall in Zürich, which became known as the Tonhalle Series or "Musica Viva". The Tonhalle Series grew increasingly abstract and focused on the feelings of the music. He used a visual form to translate the mathematical system that is found in music, playing with visual scale, rhythm, and repetition, while trying to stay true to each musicians composition who was featured on the poster.

In 1952, Müller-Brockmann designed an "accident barometer" which displayed statistics on reckless driving, which was displayed on a large scale sign in Paradeplatz for his client the Automobile Club of Switzerland.

In 1957, he began teaching at the Zurich University of the Arts, replacing Ernst Keller as a professor of graphic design. He was professor of graphic design at Zurich University of the Arts from 1957 to 1960, and guest lecturer at the University of Osaka from 1961, and the Ulm School of Design (German: Hochschule für Gestaltung Ulm) from 1963.

In 1958, Müller-Brockmann became a founding editor of New Graphic Design along with Hans Neuburg, Richard Paul Lohse, and Carlo Vivarelli.

In 1967, he was appointed as a European design consultant to IBM and formed his design firm Muller-Brockmann & Co.

Müller-Brockmann's work is included in many public museum collections including the Museum of Modern Art (MoMA), Cooper Hewitt, Smithsonian Design Museum, Museum für Gestaltung Zürich, among others.

== Personal life ==
In 1943, he married violinist Verena Brockmann, and together they had one son Andreas (born 1944). At that point he changed his last name to Müller-Brockmann. The first marriage lasted until 1964, when Verena was killed in an accident.

In 1967, he married Japanese abstract painter Shizuko Yoshikawa.

== Gallery ==
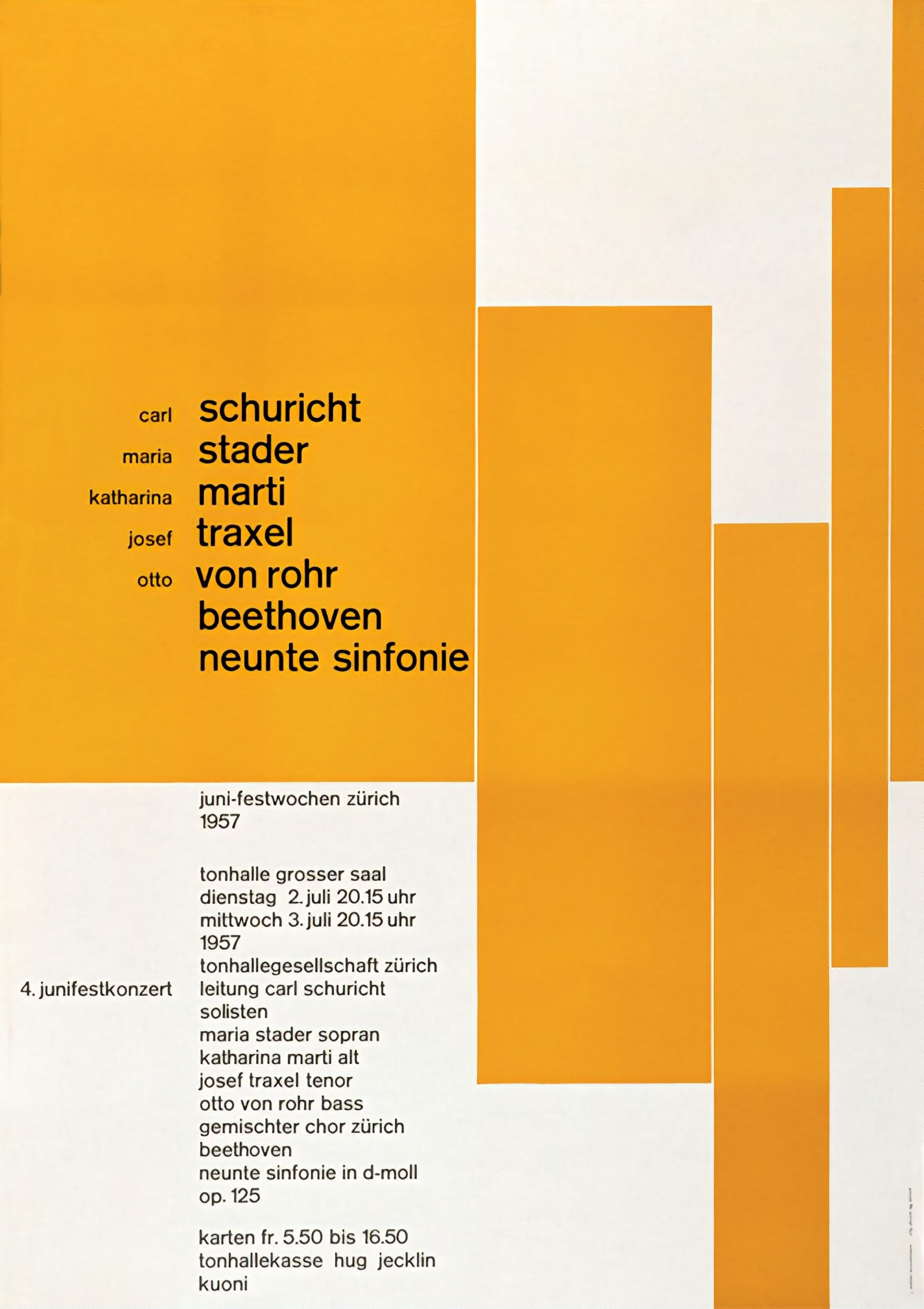
Juni-Festwochen Zürich (poster, 1957)

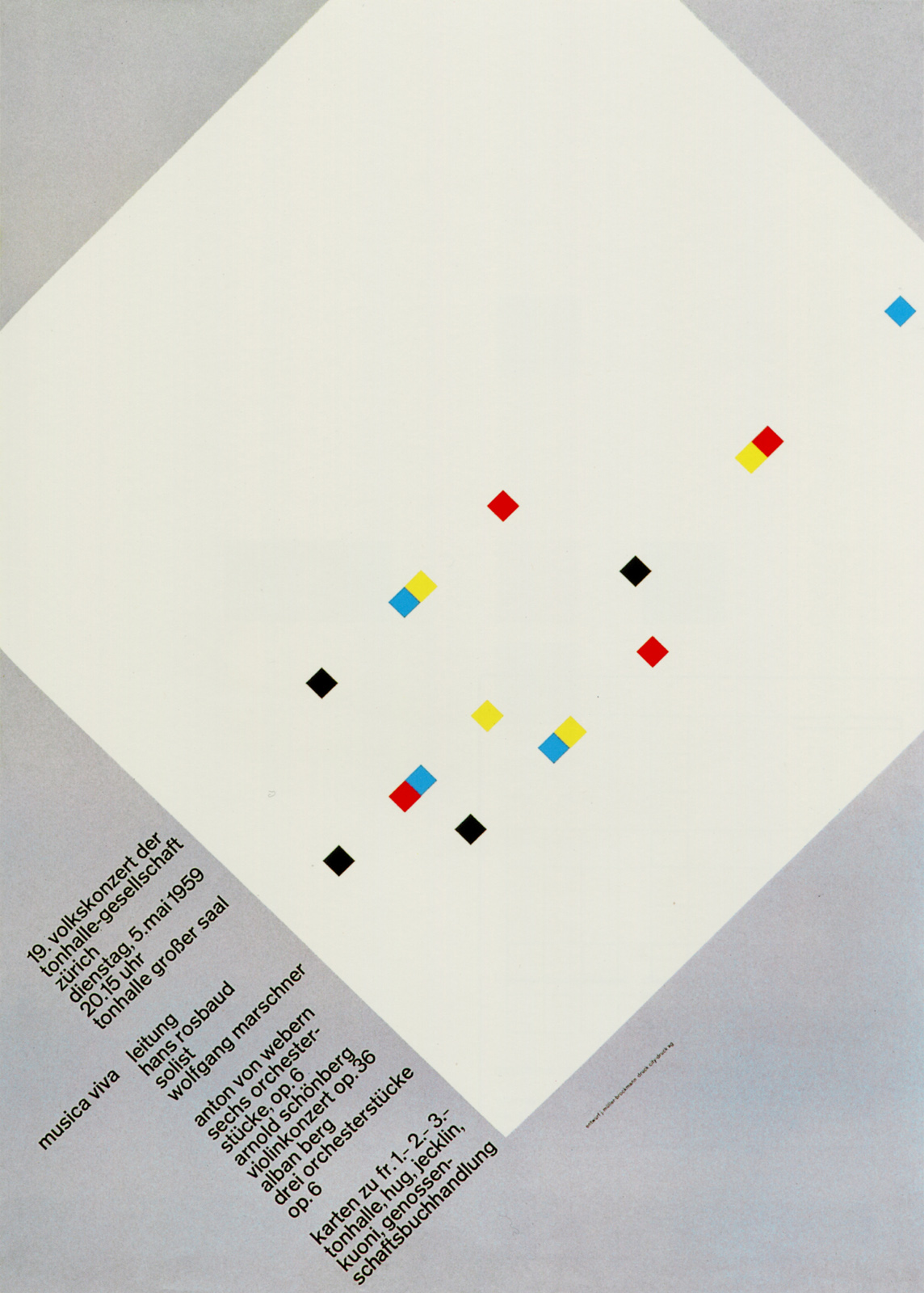
Musica Viva (poster, 1959)

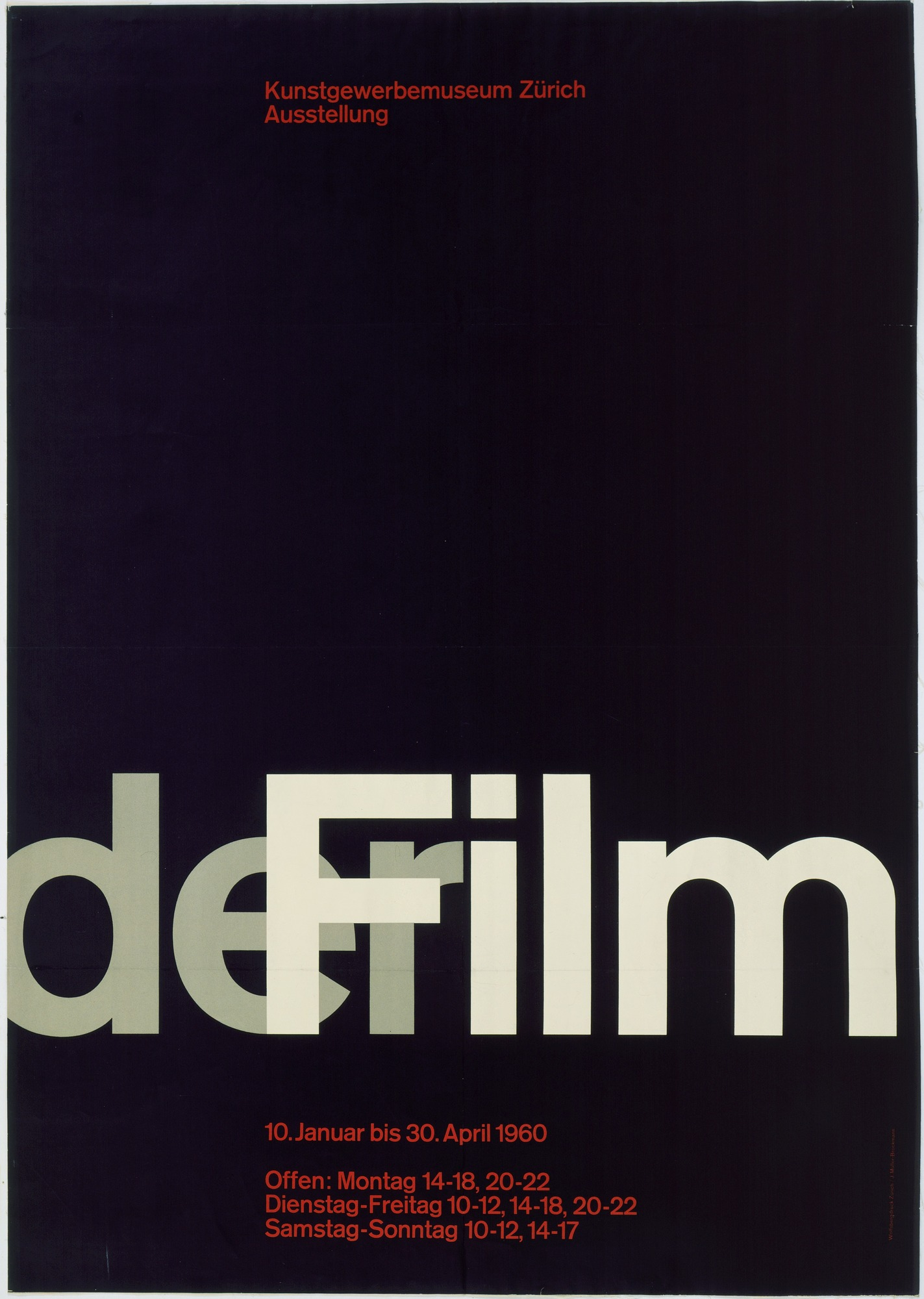
Der Film (poster, 1960)

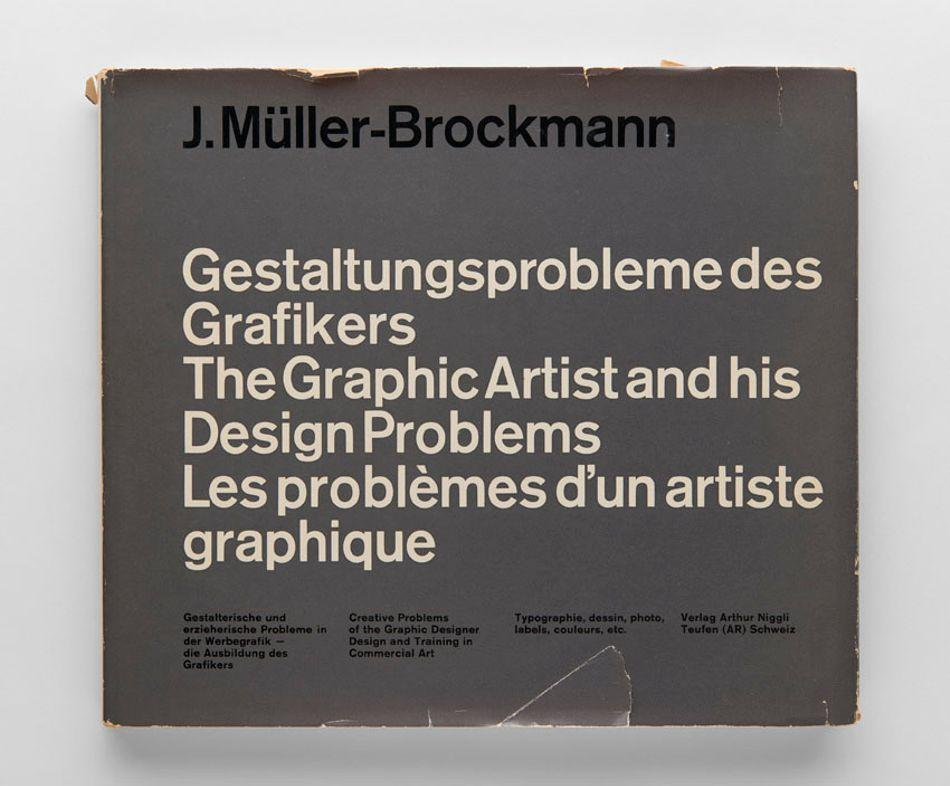
Gestaltungsprobleme des Grafiker (book, 1961)

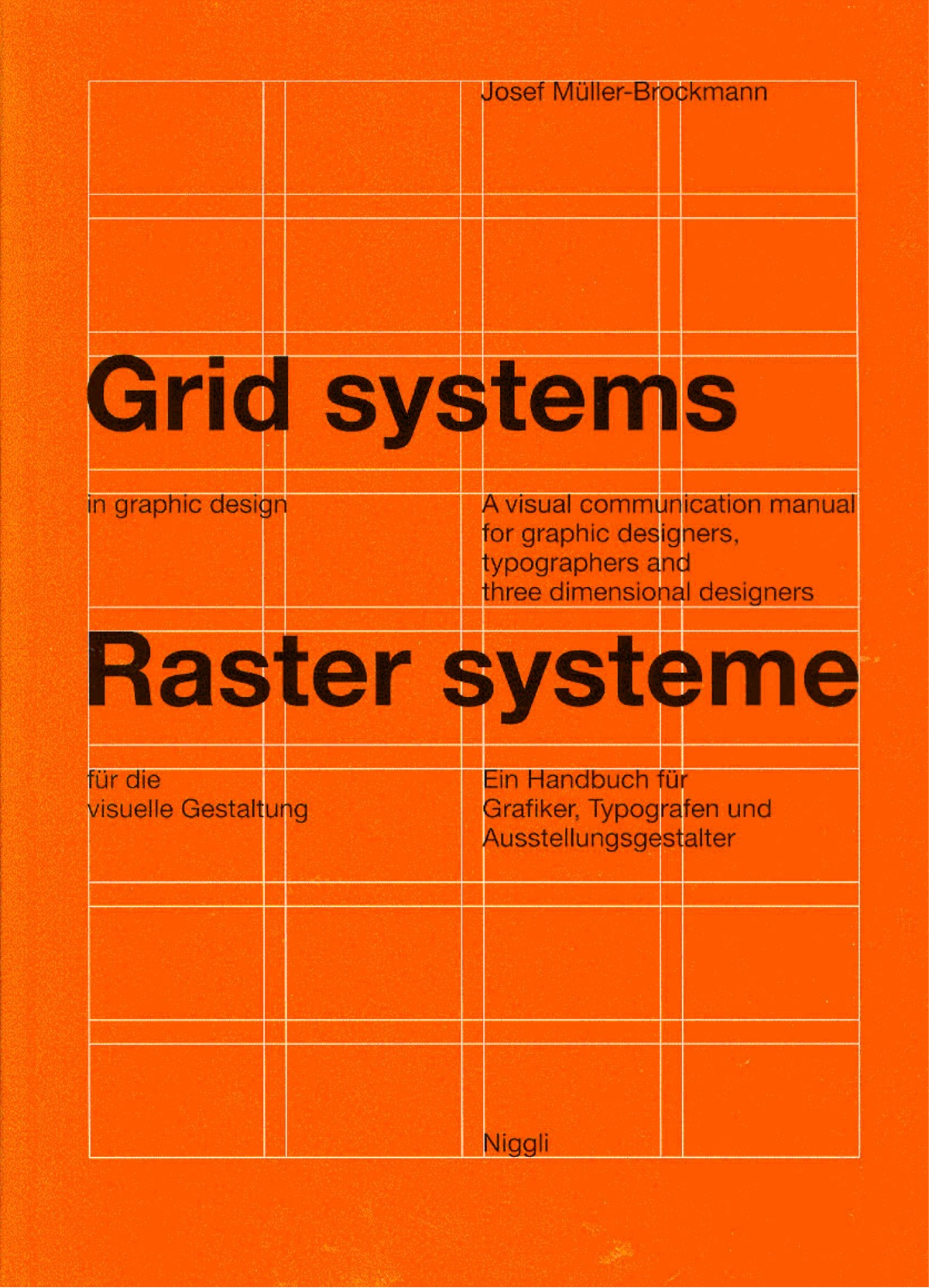
Grid systems (book, 1981)

== See also ==
- Swiss Style (design)
- International Typographic Style

== Bibliography ==
Müller-Brockmann was author of several books on design and visual communication.

- Müller-Brockmann, Josef (1961). Gestaltungsprobleme des Grafikers: The Graphic Artist and his Design Problems: Les Problèmes d'un Artiste Graphique. Teufen, Switzerland: Arthur Niggli.
- Müller-Brockmann, Josef (1971). A History of Visual Communication: Geschichte Der Visuellen Kommunikation: Histoire de la Communication Visuelle. Teufen, Switzerland: Arthur Niggli.
- Müller-Brockmann, Josef; Müller-Brockmann, Shizuko (1971). Geschichte des Plakates: Histoire de l' affiche: History of the Poster. Zürich, Switzerland: ABC Verlag. ISBN 9780714844039.
- Muller-Brockmann, Josef (1981). Grid Systems in Graphic Design; Raster Systeme Fur Die Visuelle Gestaltung. Niederteufen, Switzerland: Arthur Niggli. ISBN 9783721201451.
- Müller-Brockmann, Josef (1988). Graphic Design in IBM: Typography, Photography, Illustration. International Business Machines Corporation (IBM). IBM Europe.
- Müller-Brockmann, Josef; Wobmann, Karl (1989). Fotoplakate: von den Anfängen bis zur Gegenwart [Photo posters: From the Beginning to the Present]. Museum of Design Zurich. Aarau, Switzerland: AT Verlag. ISBN 9783855023516.
- Müller-Brockmann, Josef (1994). Mein Leben: Spielerischer Ernst und ernsthaftes Spiel [My Life: Playful Seriousness and Serious Play] (autobiography). Baden: Lars Müller. ISBN 978-3906700786.
- Müller-Brockmann, Josef (2001). Josef Müller-Brockmann: Pioneer of Swiss Graphic Design. Lars Müller Publishers. ISBN 9783906700892.
