= Emil Ruder =

Swiss typographer and graphic designer (1914–1970)

- Born: Emil Ruder; 20 March 1914; Zürich
- Died: 13 March 1970 (aged 55); Basel
- Known for: Typographer and Designer
- Movement: International Typographic Style

Emil Ruder (20 March 1914 – 13 March 1970) was a Swiss typographer and graphic designer, who was one of the most prominent masters of Swiss design and a faculty member of the Schule für Gestaltung Basel (Basel School of Design) alongside Armin Hofmann.

In his teachings, Ruder developed a notably holistic approach to design and typography that combined philosophy, theory and a systematic practical methodology. He taught that typography's purpose was to communicate ideas through writing, and placed a heavy importance on sans-serif typefaces. He expressed lofty aspirations for graphic design, writing that part of its function was to promote 'the good and the beautiful in word and image and to open the way to the arts' (TM, November 1952 Issue). No other designer since Jan Tschichold was as committed as Ruder to the discipline of letterpress typography or wrote about it with such conviction.

== Swiss Style ==
The Swiss Style (as a conditional continuation of International Typographic Style) was developed in Switzerland in the 1950s. This style was defined by the use of sans-serif typefaces, and employed a page grid for structure, producing asymmetrical layouts. By the 1960s, the grid had become a routine procedure. The grid came to imply the style and methods of Swiss Graphic Design. Ruder demonstrated a grid of nine squares as the basis for different sizes of image. There are 24 possible positions and shapes of image.

Also stressed was the combination of typography and photography as a means of visual communication. The primary influential works were developed as posters, which were seen to be the most effective means of communication.

== Early life ==
Emil Ruder was born in Zurich, Switzerland on March 20, 1914. Ruder was trained as a typesetter in Basel (1929-1933), and studied in Paris from 1938-1939. Ruder published a basic grammar of typography entitled, Typographie. The text was published in German, English and French, by Swiss publisher Arthur Niggli in 1967. The book helped spread and propagate the Swiss Style, and became a basic text for graphic design and typography programs in Europe and North America. In 1962 he helped to found the International Center for the Typographic Arts (ICTA) in New York.

== Education and career ==
Ruder began his education in design at the age of fifteen when he took a compositor's apprenticeship. By his late twenties, he began attending the Kunstgewerbeschule Zürich where the principles of Bauhaus and Tschichold's new typography were taught.

Ruder first began teaching in 1942 at the Allgemeine Gewerbeschule in the Swiss city of Basel. There, he was in charge of typography for trade students. He became the head of the Department of Apprentices in Applied arts by 1947. In 1947 Ruder met the artist-printer Armin Hofmann. Ruder and Hoffman began a long period of collaboration. Their teaching achieved an international reputation by the mid-1950s. By the mid-1960s their courses were maintaining lengthy waiting lists. He was a contributing writer and editor for Typografische Monatsblätter (Typographic Monthly), which was a popular trade publication of the time. In 1946, his design was unsuccessful in the competition for the cover design of Typographische Monatsblätter.

During the post war years when, in almost every field of applied art, there was still no sign of transition to a new form of expression better fitted to the times, Emil Ruder was one of the first pioneers to discard all of the conventional rules of traditional typography and to establish new laws of composition more in accord with the modern era. In spite of his bent for pictorial thinking, he was never tempted to indulge in merely playful designs in which the actual purpose of printing - legibility - would be lost. Ruder's insistence that the primary aim of typography was communication did not exclude aesthetic effects. Contrast was one of his methods. He was essentially devoted to the craft of letterpress printing.

== Typografische Monatsblätter ==
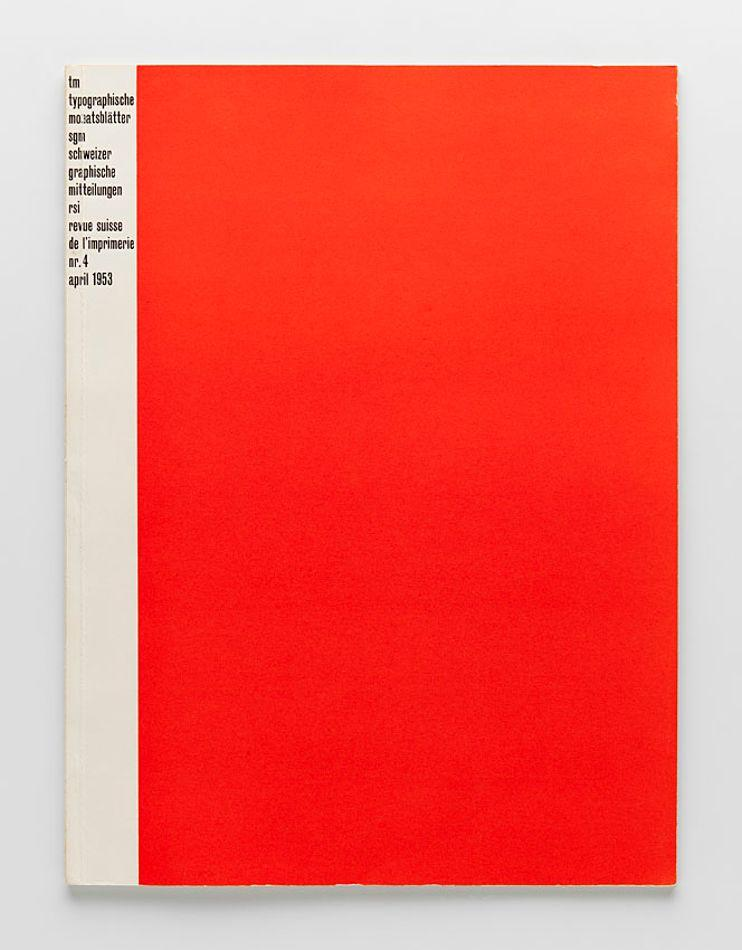
Cover design by Emil Ruder for a 1953 issue of TM.

From 1946, Emil Ruder slowly emerged in Typografische Monatsblätter as an exponent of Modernism. Between 1957 and 1959 he contributed a series of four articles with the title 'Wesentliches' (Fundamentals):'The Plane', 'The Line', 'The Word' and 'Rhythm'. They formed the basis of his thinking, summed up in 1967 in the book Typography.

In 1952, Schweizer Graphische Mitteilungen (SGM) fused with Revue Suisse de I'Imprimerie and Typographische Monatsblätter into a single monthly publication known by the initials TM. Emil Ruder was among the chief figures in the new magazine, and was a key force in typographical thinking.

Three articles, in February 1952, established Ruder as a supporter of radical change. In January 1952, the first issue of the combined magazines retained Times as the text typeface; He introduced Monotype in the February issue that included his Bauhaus article.

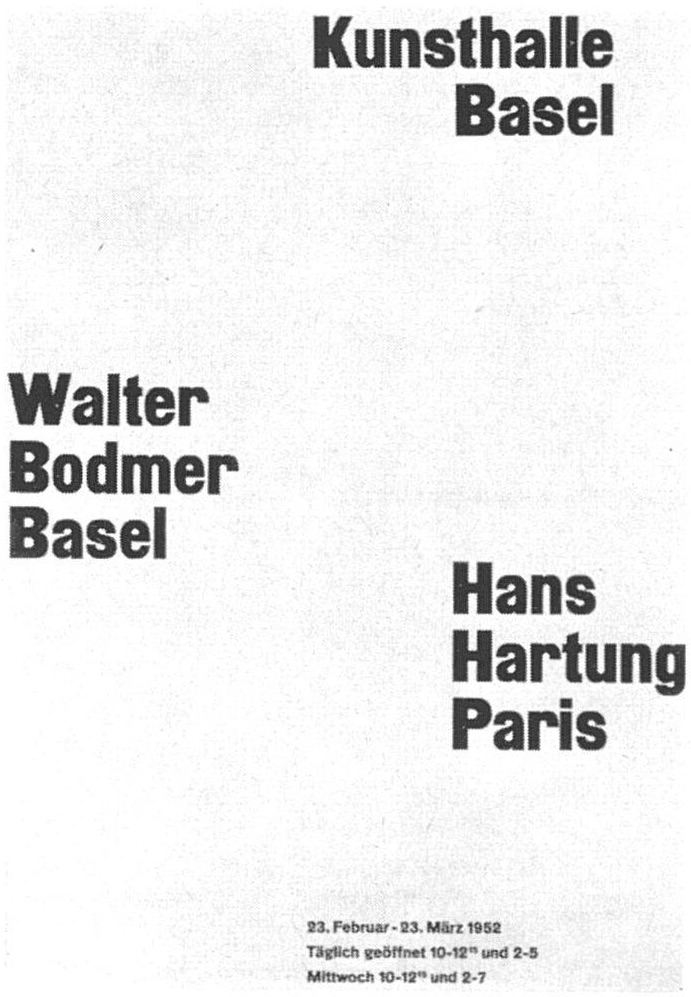
Poster design by Emil Ruder for an exhibition, 1952.

== Notable works ==
After twenty-five years of teaching, Ruder published a heavily illustrated book capturing his ideas, methods and approach. The book, Typographie: A Manual for Design, represents a critical reflection on Ruder’s teaching and practice as well as a lifetime of accumulated knowledge. Other than publishing his book Typographie, he is known for his use of the grid system in Swiss Style design as well as his poster designs.

== See also ==
- Swiss Style (design)
- International Typographic Style
