= Schule für Gestaltung Basel =

Post-graduate design school in Basel, Switzerland

Basel School of Design
- Schule für Gestaltung Basel
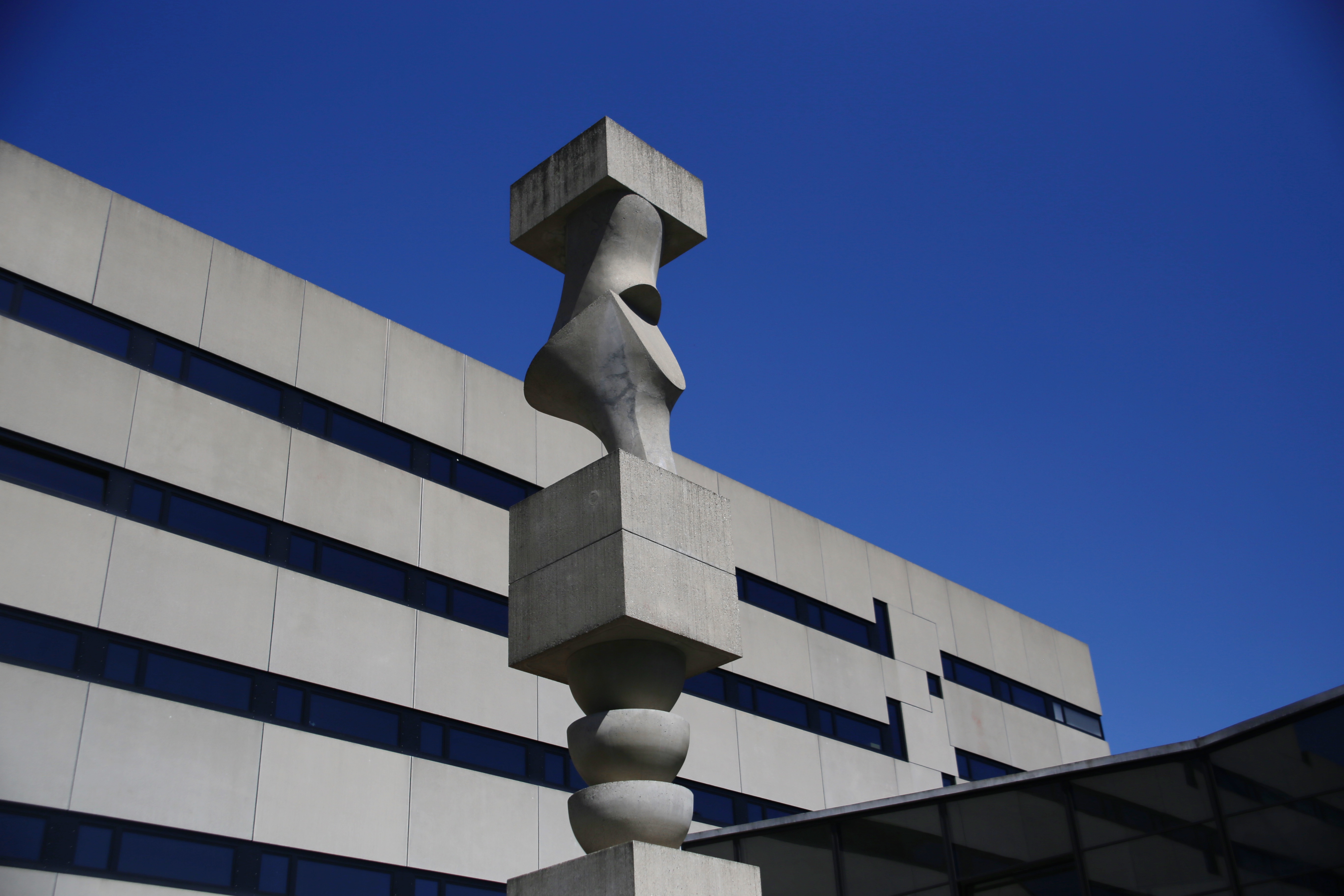
- Type: postgraduate
- Established: 1887
- Location: Vogelsangstrasse 15, Basel, 4058, Switzerland; 47.5667°N 07.6°E
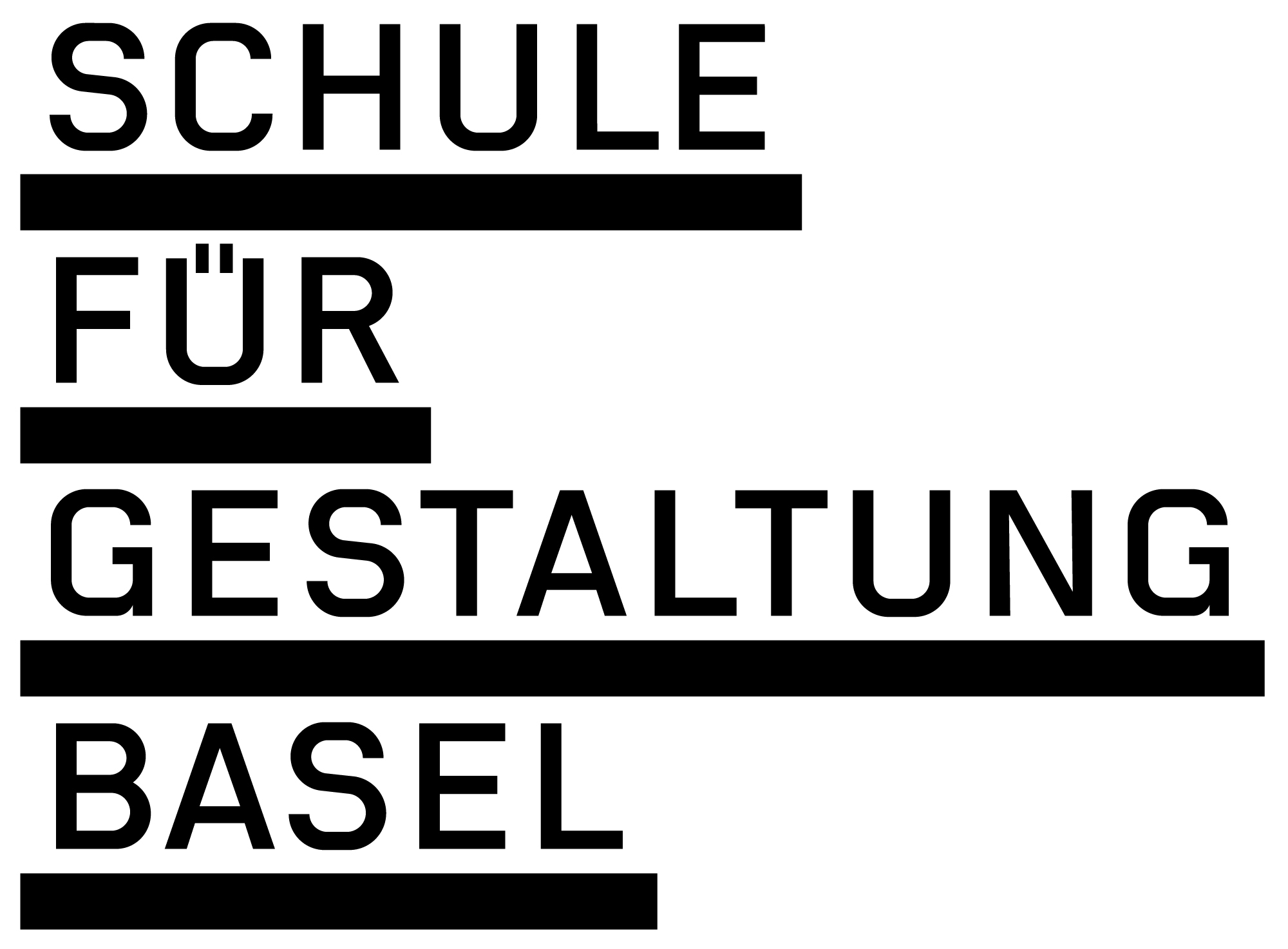

The Schule für Gestaltung Basel (Basel School of Design) is a cantonal vocational school (Berufsschule) for training and continuing education in design, communication design, and art, located at Vogelsangstrasse 15 in Basel, Switzerland. In 2003, the school was formally separated from the Allgemeine Gewerbeschule and became an independent institution with its own administration. Its students have influenced the international graphic design community since the postgraduate program opened in 1968, though the school's roots trace back to a drawing school founded in 1796 and the Allgemeine Gewerbeschule established in 1887. Its tradition is shaped by graphic design pioneers Armin Hofmann, Emil Ruder, and Wolfgang Weingart. The name of the school represents an educational approach which perpetuates their ideas: to lay a strong and broad foundation for the major design disciplines. The institution adopted its current name, Schule für Gestaltung Basel, in 1980, when the arts and design department of the Allgemeine Gewerbeschule was renamed.

The Weiterbildungsklasse für Grafik (Advanced Class for Graphic Design) was an international postgraduate program co-founded in 1968 by Emil Ruder and Armin Hofmann, with Wolfgang Weingart joining as faculty from its inception. The program ran until 1999. to address the growing interest of many trained designers who were searching for a means to deepen or extend their knowledge or skills. The program offered an intensive study of basic design principles and a broad horizon in form-related design processes. For thirty years, students from all over the world attended the program and it became an outstanding model for a modernist design education.

From 2000 onward, the higher design programs (Höhere Fachschule) and arts classes previously held at the Schule für Gestaltung Basel were transferred to the Fachhochschule beider Basel (FHBB), which later became the University of Applied Sciences and Arts Northwestern Switzerland (FHNW). Continuing the tradition set forth by the Weiterbildunglsklasse für Grafik, a collaboration initiated in 2007 by the School of Design at University of Illinois Chicago (UIC) and the Academy of Art and Design FHNW offers a two-year internationally accredited Master of Design degree, providing graphic designers with a bachelor’s degree and professional design experience the opportunity to hone their skills and further develop their approach to visual communication.

The Schule für Gestaltung Basel’s Basics in Design program offers its own professional courses of study, as well as postgraduate programs in textile design, typography, and graphic design. In addition, a month-long Summer Workshops has been offered since 2005, based on the Yale-Brissago Summer Program (1977–1996).
