= Chrysler Design Award =

Chrysler Design Awards
- Description: Honoring innovative works of architecture and design
- Country: United States
- Presented by: Chrysler Corporation
- Rewards: $10,000 and a trophy

The Chrysler Design Awards celebrate the achievements of individuals in innovative works of architecture and design which significantly influenced modern American culture. Chrysler's awards started in 1993 to recognize six designers based in the United States with a trophy and $10,000 cash prize. After 10 years in 2003 Chrysler corporation decided to end its Chrysler Design Awards program.

== List of Awardees ==
=== 2002 ===
- Red Burns
- Mildred (Mickey) Friedman
- Steve Jobs
- Phyllis Lambert
- Murray Moss
- Daniel Patrick Moynihan

=== 2001 ===
- Kathryn Gustafson
- Susan Kare
- Thom Mayne
- Daniel Rozin
- Stefan Sagmeister
- Studio Works

=== 2000 ===
- Will Bruder
- James Corner
- David M. Kelley
- Ted Muehling
- Gary Panter
- Paula Scher

=== 1999 ===
- Pablo Ferro
- Peter Girardi
- John Maeda
- Karim Rashid
- Jesse Reiser/Nanako Umemoto
- Gael Towey

=== 1998 ===
- Erik Adigard/Patricia McShane
- April Greiman
- Steven Holl
- Mars Pathfinder Team
- Bruce Mau
- Tod Williams/Billie Tsien

=== 1997 ===
- Diller Scofidio + Renfro Elizabeth Diller/Ricardo Scofidio
- Edward Fella
- Chuck Hoberman
- Lisa Krohn
- Burt Rutan
- Allan Wexler

=== 1996 ===
- Matthew Carter
- Niels Diffrient
- Craig Hodgetts/Hsin-Ming Fung
- Tibor Kalman
- Matt Scogin/Merrill Elam
- Richard Saul Wurman

=== 1995 ===
- Frank O. Gehry
- Robert M. Greenberg
- Ralf Hotchkiss
- ReVerb (Somi Kim, Whitney Lowe, Lisa Nugent, Susan Parr, Lorraine Wild)
- James Wines
- Philip Zimmermann

=== 1994 ===
- Muriel Cooper
- Zuzana Licko/Rudy VanderLans
- Katherine McCoy/Michael McCoy
- Achva Benzinberg
- John H. Todd/Nancy Jack Todd
- Lebbeus Woods
- Carl Green

=== 1993 ===
- Apple Industrial Design Group
- Cross Colours
- John Hejduk
- Ellen Lupton/J. Abbott Miller
- Paul MacCready
- Gaetano Pesce
