= April Greiman =

American designer

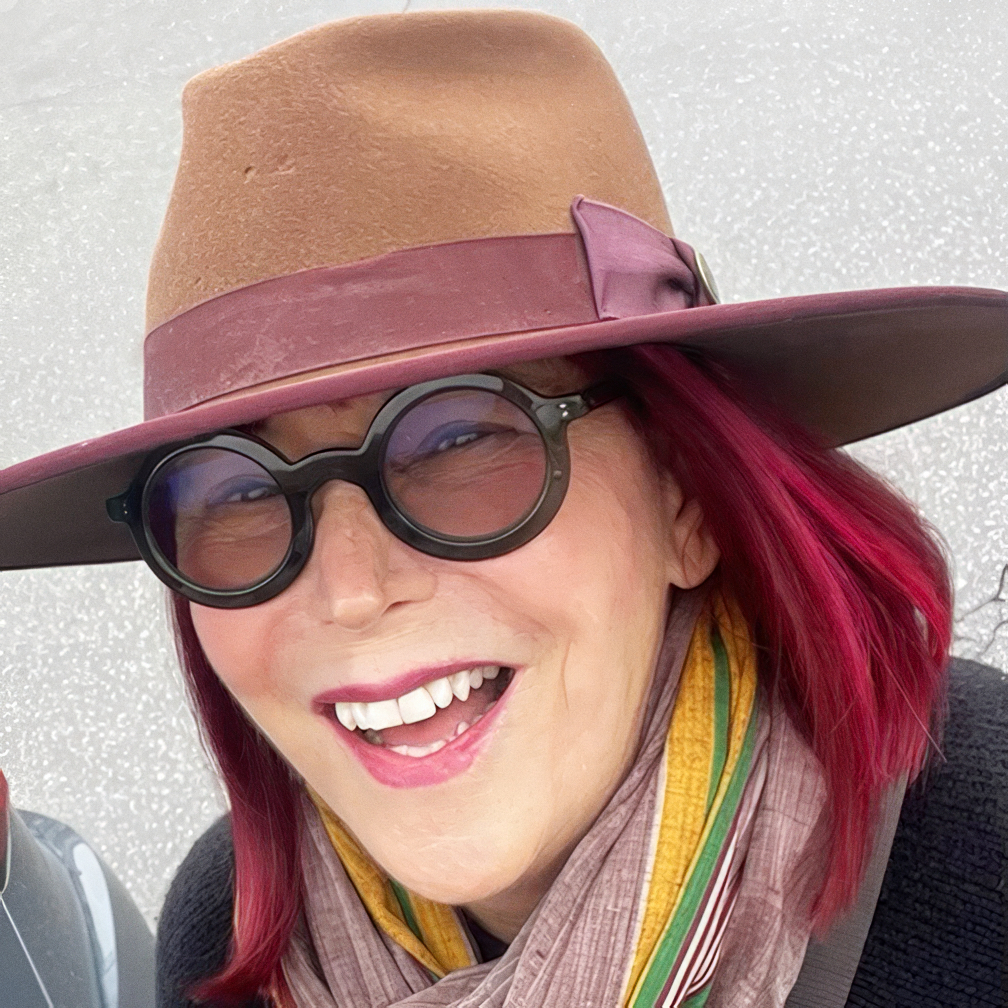
- Greiman in 2024
- Born: March 22, 1948 (age 78)
- Occupation: Designer
- Known for: One of the first designers to embrace computer technology as a design tool
- Notable work: Design Quarterly #133: Does it Make Sense?, Pompidou, MOMA, LACMA, SFMOMA, 1986
- Website: aprilgreiman.com madeinspace.la

April Greiman (born March 22, 1948) is an American designer widely recognized as one of the first designers to embrace computer technology as a design tool. Greiman is also credited, along with early collaborator Jayme Odgers, with helping to import the European New Wave design style to the US during the late 70s and early 80s." According to design historian Steven Heller, "April Greiman was a bridge between the modern and postmodern, the analog and the digital." "She is a pivotal proponent of the 'new typography' and new wave that defined late twentieth-century graphic design." Her art combines her Swiss design training with West Coast postmodernism.

Greiman finds the title graphic designer too limiting and prefers to call herself a "transmedia artist". Her work has inspired designers to develop the computer as a tool of design and to be curious and exploratory in their design approach. Her process includes typelayering, where words and letters are sandwiched and layered, but also appear to float along with other 'objects in space' such as: color swatches, illustrations, lines, mapping, photographs, shapes, among other visual assets. She creates a sense of depth and dynamism, in particular, by combining graphic elements through making extensive use of Apple Macintosh technology. Los Angeles Times called her graphic style "an experiment in creating hybrid imagery." She has been called the "Queen of New Wave" within the movement, although she has said that she resents that title.

== Early life and education ==
Born on March 22, 1948, and New Jersey, metropolitan New York, April Greiman grew up in Wantagh, Long Island and later Woodcliff Lake, NJ. Her father was an early computer programmer, systems analyst at Lightolier where he introduced the first main-frame computer into Lightolier's business, and later, founder and president of The Ventura Institute of Technology. Her mother, Renee, was a dancer and dance teacher in collaboration with the Fred Astaire Dance Studio. Her only sibling, Paul, became a meteorologist and specialist in climatic and atmospheric interplanetary modeling.

From 1966-70 Greiman was an undergraduate at the Kansas City Art Institute, and studied graphic design, photography and ceramics. In 1970-71 Greiman continued her postgraduate studies at the Allgemeine Kunstgewerbeschule Basel, now known as the Basel School of Design (Schule für Gestaltung Basel) in Basel, Switzerland (1970–1971). As a student of Armin Hofmann and Wolfgang Weingart, and she was influenced by the International Style and by Weingarts' introduction to the style later known as New Wave, an aesthetic that moved away from a Modernist heritage.

== Career ==
During the 1970s, she rejected the belief, among many contemporary designers, that computers and digitalization would compromise the International Typographic Style; instead, she exploited emergent technologies and the Basic Chance Principle as integral parts of digital art, a position she has held throughout her career.

After completing her postgraduate studies in Switzerland, Greiman moved to Philadelphia and became an associate professor at the Philadelphia College of Art, (now known as University of the Arts) and worked as a freelance designer in Philadelphia and New York City. Utilizing her aesthetic that "...blends technology, science, word and image with color and space...". Greiman worked on projects with Emilio Ambasz, Curator of Design at the Museum of Modern Art.

In 1976 Greiman moved to Los Angeles, after a brief stint as a freelancer with a corporate design agency in Century City, and established the studio, April Greiman, Inc. and became a leading figure of the emergent California New Wave.

Upon Greiman's relocation from New York City to Los Angeles, she met designer-photographer Jayme Odgers, who became a significant collaborator. In 1978 they designed a famous Cal Arts poster that became a seminal design of the California New Wave. They also collaborated on a poster design for the 1984 Los Angeles Olympics. In 1981 they created an iconic poster of running legs silhouetted against a square of bright blue sky that was published in 1982 in advance of the 1984 Olympics.

In 1982, Greiman was appointed Director of the design department at the California Institute of the Arts, also known as Cal Arts. In 1984, she lobbied successfully to change the department name to Visual Communications, as she felt the term "graphic design" would prove too limiting to future designers. At Cal Arts she had the opportunity to experiment with new technology where she had access to an analog computer, synthesizer and video equipment set up by the instructor and famed artist, Nam June Paik, and investigated in greater depth the effects of technology in her own work.

Greiman began acquiring her own equipment beginning with a first generation half-inch video camera. This led to working with the Quantel Paintbox. By observing this new and innovative equipment, Greiman applied this knowledge to early low-resolution tools, such as Amiga and Apple Inc. (formerly Apple Computer Inc.).

An early adopter of computer technology, as noted in Apple's Mac @ 30 video, in February 1984 in Monterey, California, Greiman attended the first TED Conference, or Technology, Entertainment, and Design conference that featured several notable speakers including demos of the compact disc, co-developed by Philips and Sony, and one of the first demonstrations of the Apple Macintosh computer by Alan Kay which inspired her to acquire her first computer, the Macintosh computer.

In 1986, Greiman was invited by The Walker Art Center to produce Issue 133 of Design Quarterly entitled: Does It Make Sense? The edition was edited by Mildred Friedman and published by the MIT Press & Walker Art Center. Using MacVision, a combination hardware/software interface to digitize still frames from a video camera or VCR, Greiman re-imagined the magazine as a fold-out artwork. The nearly three-by-six foot print carefully unfolds three times across and nine times down revealing a life-sized image of Greiman's outstretched naked body adorned with symbolic images and text. Does It Make Sense? was a provocative gesture, which "emphatically countered the objective, rational and masculine tendencies of modernist design", Greiman has said about the artwork's unusual format and title, "the sense it has for me is that it's new and yet old,... it's a magazine, which is an artwork, which is an object, which is... crazy." Does It Make sense? also launched the Walker Art Center's new Everyday Art Gallery and part of many institution and museum collections.

In 1988 in MacWorld's First Annual Mac Masters Art Competition, Greiman was awarded Fine Arts First Prize (A) for her Pacific Wave Sculpture, a project produced for the Fortuny Museum in Venice, Italy, for the museum's Pacific Wave Festival, an exhibition celebrating California graphic designers September 27 – December 27, 1987. Greiman also designed the official poster, Pacific Wave, for the festival, now in several museum collections including LACMA, and featured in The Getty's marketing for 2024 PST ART: Art & Science Collide, an initiative with arts institutions across Southern California.

In 1995, the US Postal Service issued a 32-cent Women's Suffrage commemorative stamp designed by Greiman to commemorate the Nineteenth Amendment to the United States Constitution (Women's Voting Rights). The stamp went on sale nationwide on August 28, 1995. The stamp was printed by Ashton-Potter USA, Ltd. (established in 1925 in Canada by the Ashton and Potter families) in the offset printing / intaglio (printmaking) process and is included in the collection of the National Postal Museum of the Smithsonian Institution.

In 1997, Greiman and her husband, architect Michael Rotondi, purchased Miracle Manor, a 1940's motel in the Desert Hot Springs on top of Miracle Hill, with naturally hot and cold mineral springs discovered over 100 years ago. Innovatively restored and turned it into a retreat showcased their three-dimensional design as an oasis of the spirit with "pool and buildings with a purity equal to the desert's." Celebrating the subtle forms and textures of the desert, sky, and waters.

In 2005, Greiman established her current Los Angeles-based design consultancy Made In Space.

=== Teaching ===
In 1982, Greiman became the Director of the Visual Communications Program of the California Institute of the Arts' design department. In 1992, she was adjunct faculty at the Southern California Institute of Architecture until 2009 when she moved on to the Woodbury University School of Architecture until 2018. In Spring 2020, Greiman became a tenured professor of design at the University of Southern California Roski School of Art and Design.

With four honorary doctorates, April Greiman is seen as one of the "ultimate risktakers" for her approach to design by the use of new technologies.

== Honors and awards ==
- Vesta Award for Outstanding Achievements of Women, Hearth and Home Magazine, Los Angeles, California, 1985
- Alliance Graphique Internationale (AGI), Invited Board Member, 1986
- Grand Prize Winner, Macintosh Masters in Art Competition, Macworld, San Francisco, California, 1988 Winner, Unesco International Poster Contest, 1987
- Winner, The Modern Poster Competition, Museum of Modern Art (MoMA), New York City, New York, 1988
- Hall Chair Fellowship, Hallmark Corporation, Kansas City, Missouri, 1990
- Frankfurt Book Fair Bronze Medal for From the Edge: Southern California Institute of Architecture, Der Stiftung Buchkunst Prâmiert (Best Books of the World), Los Angeles, California, 1994
- 50 Best Books of the Year, AIGA, New York City, New York, 1997
- AIGA, Gold Medalist, New York City, New York, 1998
- Chrysler Award for Design Innovation, Auburn Hill, Michigan, 1998
- Finalist, Inaugural National Design Award in Communication Arts, Awarded at White House, Clinton Administration, Washington, DC, 2000
- Kansas City Art Institute, honorary doctorate, Kansas City, Missouri, 2001
- College of Art and Design, Lesley University, honorary doctorate, Cambridge, Massachusetts, 2002
- Academy of Art University, honorary doctorate, San Francisco, California, 2003
- Masters Series Award, School of Visual Arts, New York City, New York, 2008
- Art Center College of Design, honorary doctorate, Pasadena, California, 2012
- Honorary Member Award for Lifetime Achievement Award, Society of Typographic Arts, Chicago, Illinois, 2018

== Notable works and accomplishments ==
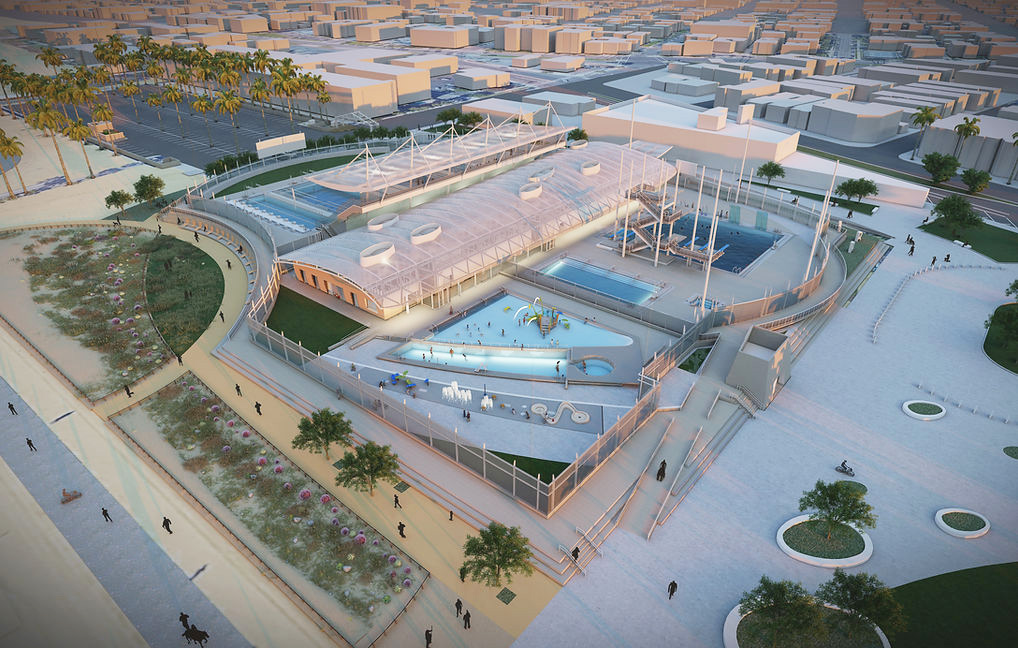
Greiman in collaboration with RoTo Architects on BBAC, an aquatic sports community center with Made In Space's project scope of public art, signage, and wayfinding.

- Belmont Beach Aquatic Center, color palette, environmental graphics, and signage for 5-acre aquatic sports community recreation center with RoTo Architects, Long Beach, CA, in progress
- Indian Institute of Technology, Experimental Typography, Keynote Speech, Industrial Design Centre, Mumbai, India, March 2, 2019 – March 4, 2019
- Architecture + Design Museum (A+D), Farbe/Color: Armin Hofmann, Exhibition Design and Curation with RoTo Architects, 2013, traveled to Miller Institute for Contemporary Art, Carnegie Mellon University, Pittsburgh, Pennsylvania, November 15, 201 – March 1, 2015; Rosenwald-Wolf Gallery, Philadelphia, Pennsylvania, August 24 – October 7, 2016; and Minneapolis College of Art and Design (MCAD) Gallery, Minneapolis, Minnesota, July 28 – September 17, 2017.
- Apple Documentary Movie, MAC @ 30, Featured Designer, January 2014
- Architecture + Design Museum (A+D), Drylands Design, Exhibition Environmental Graphics and Graphic Design with Laurie Haycock Makela, Office of Hadley and Peter Arnold and Chu-Gooding Architects, Los Angeles, California, 2012
- Victoria and Albert Museum (V&A), Postmodernism: Style and Subversion 1970–1990, Exhibition and Publication with Essay, September 24, 2011– January 15, 2012
- Public Broadcasting Service (PBS), American Masters: The Architect and the Painter, Charles and Ray Eames, Video Contribution to Film, 2011
- Pacoima Neighborhood City Hall, Environmental Graphics, Signage and Color Palette for Architecture with RoTo Architects, Pacoima, California, 2010
- Orange County Great Park, Environmental Graphics, Signage and Color Palette for 1400-acre Park with Ken Smith Landscape Architect, Irvine, California, 2008
- Madame Tussaud's Wax Museum, Color and Materials Palette for Architecture with RoTo Architects, Hollywood, California, 2008
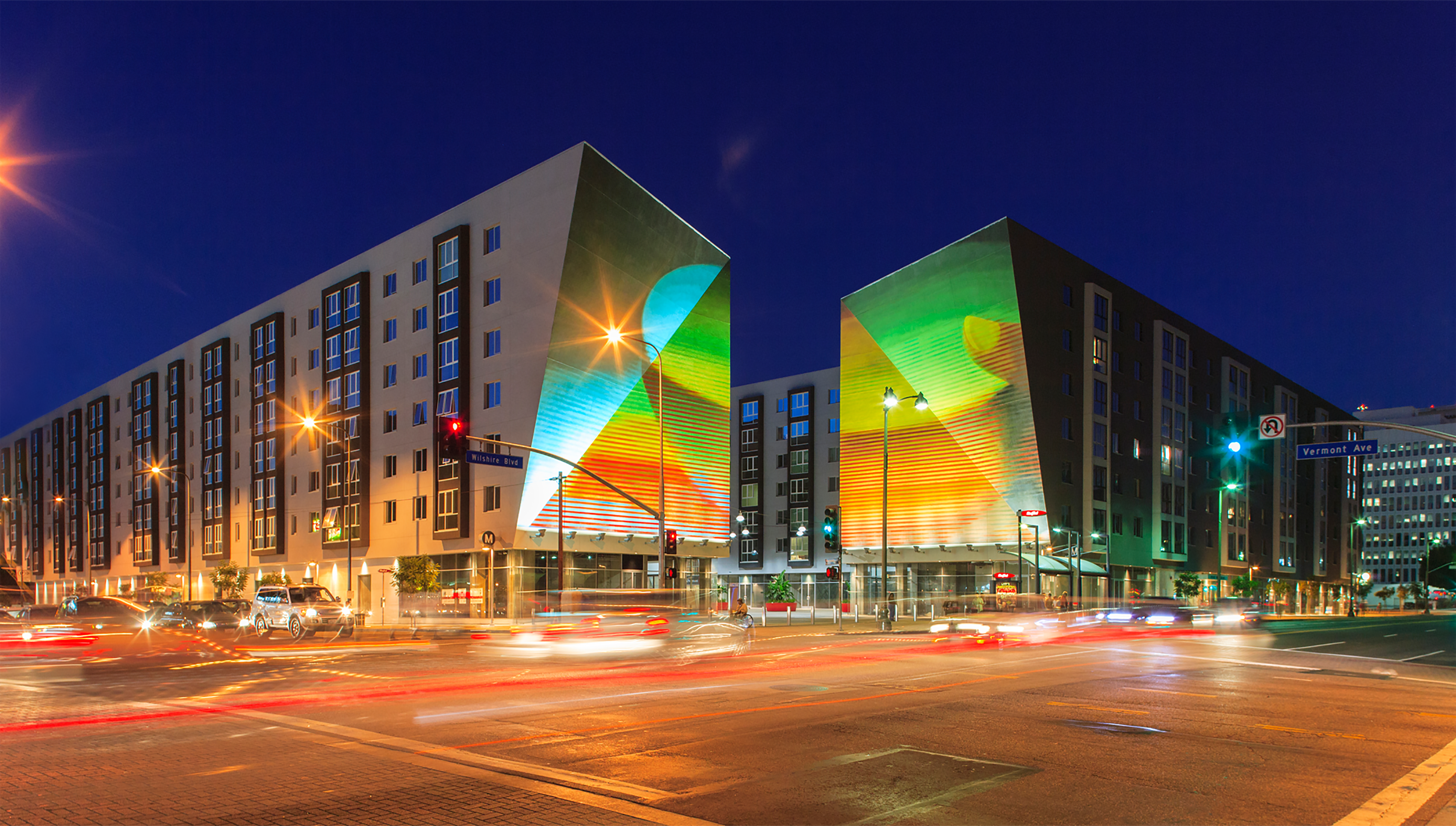
  Hand Holding a Bowl of Rice, Greiman's 8,200 sq.ft. public art commission on two facing facades and entrance to Wilshire-Vermont Metro LA, 2007.
- Hand Holding a Bowl of Rice, Public Art Commission for Wilshire Vermont Metro Station, Los Angeles, California, 2007
- Art Center College of Design, honorary doctorate, Los Angeles, California, 2012
- Pasadena Museum of California Art, Drive-by Shooting: April Greiman Digital Photography, Solo Exhibition and Monograph Publication Design, Pasadena, California, September 9 – October 8, 2006
- Prairie View School of Art and Architecture, Color and Materials Palette for Architecture with RoTo Architects, and Texas A & M University, Prairie View, Texas, 2005
- Rotovision, Something From Nothing, Monograph Publication Design, 2001
- Monacelli Press, From the Center: Design Process @ SCI-Arc," 1998
- Chrysler Award for Design Innovation, Auburn Hill, Michigan, 1998
- Miracle Manor Retreat, Design Concept, Interactive and Environmental Graphics and Interiors for Architecture with RoTo Architects, Desert Hot Springs, California, 1997–2018
- Rizzoli International Publications, Michele Saee: Buildings & Projects, Publication Design, 1997.
- US Postal Commission, 19th Amendment to the U.S. Constitution, Women's Voting Rights Commemorative Stamp, Washington, District of Columbia (DC), August 26, 1995
- Warehouse C, Color Palette for Architecture with RoTo Architects, Nagasaki, Japan, 1995
- Artemis Publishers, ItsnotwhatAprilyouthinkitGreimanis = cen'estpascequevouscroyez, Monograph Publication Design, 1994
- Der Stiftung Buchkunst Prâmiert (Best Books of the World), for From the Edge, Student Workbook, Southern California Institute of Architecture (SCI-Arc), Frankfurt Book Fair Bronze Medal, 1994
- Aldus Corporation Video Conference Program, Spokesperson with Paul Brainerd, New York City, New York; Chicago, Illinois; Seattle, Washington; and Toronto, Canada, 1993
- Nicola Restaurant, Color and Materials Palette for Architecture as well as Custom Dinnerware, Billboards, Branding and Graphics with RoTo Architects, Los Angeles, California, 1993
- Carlson-Reges Residence, Color and Materials Palette for Architecture with RoTo Architects, Los Angeles, California, 1992
- Community Redevelopment Agency of Los Angeles (CRA/LA), Walk Earth Talk, Public Art Commission collaboration with Lucille Clifton, Citicorp Plaza Poet's Walk, Los Angeles, California, 1991
- Watson-Guptill Publishers, Hybrid Imagery: The Fusion of Technology and Graphic Design, Monograph Publication Design, 1990
- Walker Art Center, Graphic Design in America: A Visual Language History, Exhibition, Poster and Billboard, Featured Designer, Minneapolis, Minnesota, 1989
- National Endowment for the Arts (NEA), Computer Graphic Studies Grant, Washington, District of Columbia, 1987
- Walker Art Center and MIT Press, Design Quarterly #133: 'Does it Make Sense?', Publication Design, 1986.
- Olympic Organizing Committee, Official Poster for the 1984 Olympic Games, Collaboration with Jayme Odgers, Los Angeles, California, 1984
- WET Magazine, Magazine Cover, Collaboration with Jayme Odgers, 1976
- Museum of Modern Art (MOMA), The Taxi Project, Exhibition and Catalogue Design with Emilio Ambasz, Curator, New York City, New York, 1975

== Collections ==
Collections of the Cooper Hewitt Design Museum, Museum of Modern Art (MOMA), San Francisco Museum of Modern Art (SFMOMA), Los Angeles County Museum of Art (LACMA) and Centre Pompidou

== Monographs ==
- April Greiman, WhiteSpace: April Greiman Photography, published by April Greiman, 2021
- April Greiman, Drive-by Shooting: April Greiman Digital Photography, exhibition catalog for Pasadena Museum of California Art, 2006
- April Greiman and Aris Janigian, Something From Nothing, Rotovision, 2001
- April Greiman and Liz Farelly, Floating Ideas into Time and Space, Watson-Guptill Publishers, Cutting Edge Series, 1998
- F. Fort, R Poynor and C. Kultenbrouwer, it'snotwhatyouthinkitis = cen'estpascequevouscroyez, Artemis Publishers, 1994
- April Greiman, Hybrid Imagery: The Fusion of Technology and Graphic Design, Watson-Guptill Publishers,1990

== Keynote speeches ==
- April Greiman, Seeing is a way of thinking. Thinking, a way of seeing, Virginia Tech School of Architecture and Design, March 14, 2022
- Objects in Space, Alliance Graphique Internationale (AGI) Open Rotterdam, Rotterdam, The Netherlands, September 24, 2019
- Experimental Typography, Indian Institute of Technology, Industrial Design Centre, Mumbai, India, March 2, 2019 – March 4, 2019
- Color as Space, Space as Color, Bend Design Conference, Bend, Oregon, October 2, 2018
- Borders, Alliance Graphique Internationale (AGI) at La Maison du Radio, Paris, France, September 20, 2017
- Grand Masters of Design, Indian Institute of Technology, Industrial Design Centre, Mumbai, India, February 4, 2007 – February 9, 2007
- April Greiman, MAC Summit at University of California–Santa Barbara, Santa Barbara, California, 1995
- April Greiman, Too Corporation, MacWorld, Tokyo, Japan, 1992
- April Greiman, IDEAS '92 Student Symposium, Melbourne, Australia, 1992

== Professional societies and positions ==
- Fellow, Nature, Art & Habitat, 2017
- Elected Member, The Trusteeship, International Women's Forum, Newport Beach, California, 2010
- Women in the Arts, Art Table, 2004
- Jury Chairperson, General Services Administration Design Awards, Washington, District of Columbia, 1999
- USA Expert Juror, China's First International Graphic Arts Competition, Beijing, China, 1996
- USA Expert Juror, Expo 2000 Mascot Competition, Hannover, Germany, 1995
- USA Expert Juror, Netherlands All Design Disciplines Competition, Netherlands, 1995
- USA Expert Juror, City of Berlin Identity Program Competition, Berlin, Germany, 1993
- Chairperson, AIGA Communications Graphics Competition, New York City, New York, 1993
- Co-Chair with Tibor Kalman, What's Going On Now, AIGA National Conference, San Francisco, California, 1987
- Invited Member, Alliance Graphique Internationale (AGI), 1986–present
- National Board Member, AIGA, 1986–1988
- President and Vice-President, AIGA, Los Angeles, 1982–1988

== Solo exhibitions ==
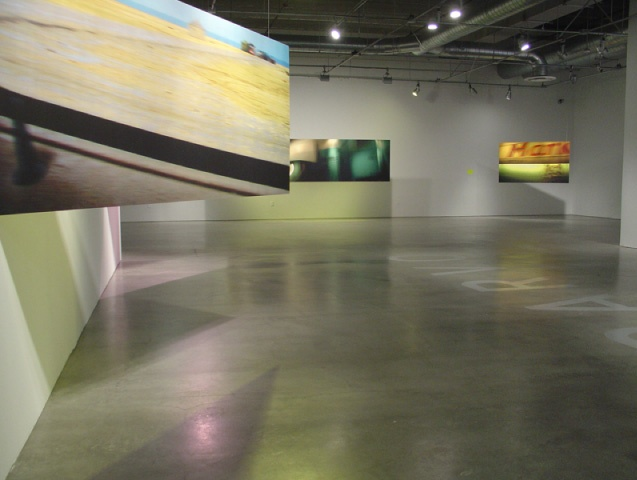
Exhibition view of Greiman's solo exhibition Drive-by Shooting: April Greiman Digital Photography at the Pasadena Museum of California Art, 2006.

In 2006, the Pasadena Museum of California Art mounted a one-woman show of her digital photography entitled: Drive-by Shooting: April Greiman Digital Photography. Greiman was also in the major group show at Centre Georges Pompidou in Paris called Elle@Centre Pompidou. In 2007, Greiman completed her largest ever work: a public mural, Hand Holding a Bowl of Rice, spanning "seven stories of two building facades marking the entrance to the Wilshire Vermont Metro Station in Los Angeles." In 2014, Greiman collaborated with the London based artist-run organization Auto Italia South East along with a group of artists including Metahaven, in an exhibition POLYMYTH x Miss Information. The exhibition program was included in the external listings for Frieze Art Fair. In 2023 Greiman co-curated with Stacie B. London, and included her artwork in It's About Time, a multidisciplinary group art exhibition of 17 artists at The Brand Library & Art Center, September–November 2023.

- Hyundai Card First Look, April Greiman, MoMA, New York City, New York, May 9, 2025 – September 1, 2025

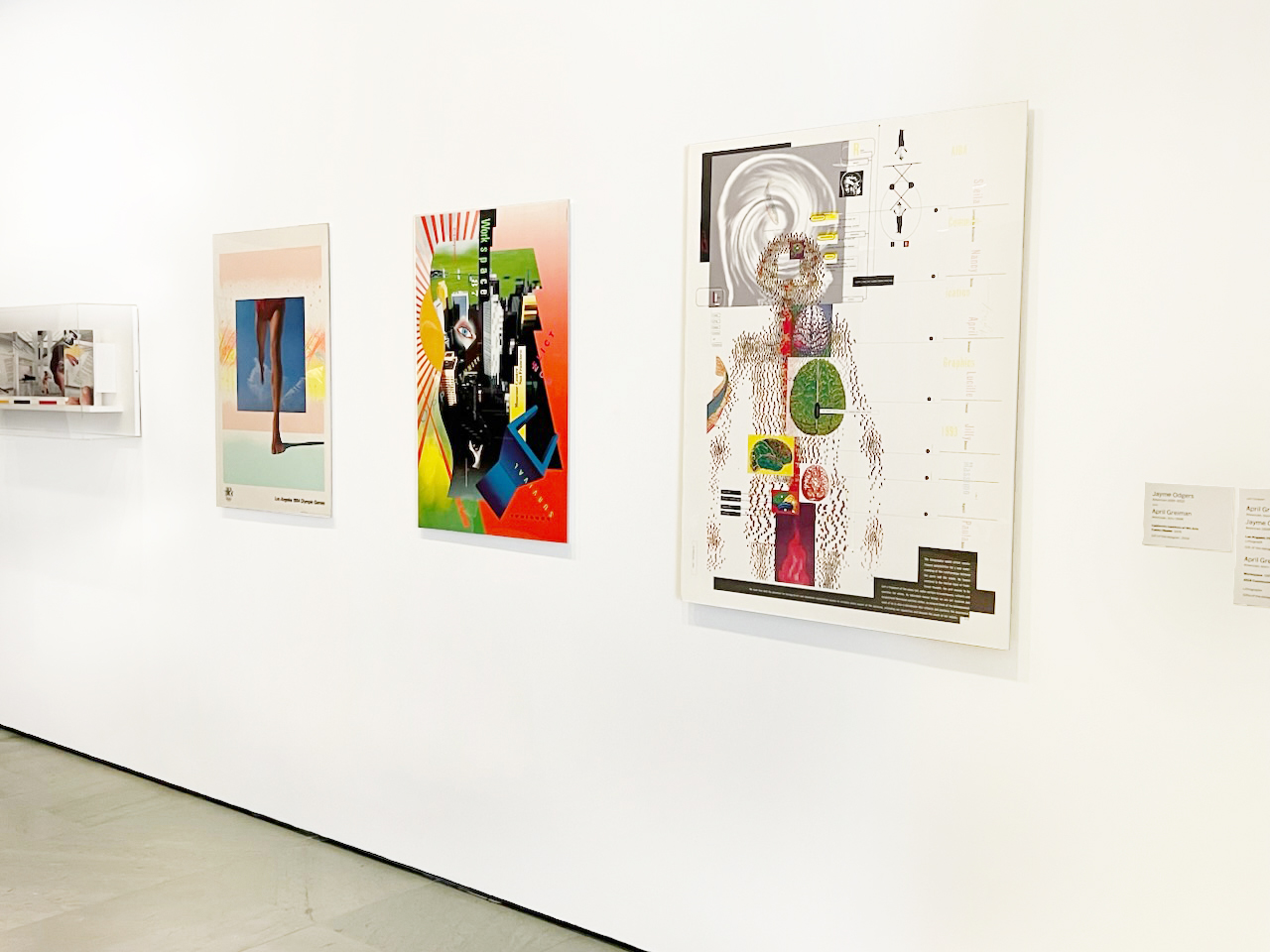
Installation view of the exhibition “Hyundai Card First Look: April Greiman,” May 9, 2025 – September 1, 2025. The Museum of Modern Art, New York.

- Do Not Trust Atoms: April Greiman, Avatars and New Photography, bulthaup Los Angeles 'Kunsthalle b,' Los Angeles, California, February 1, 2017 – May 15, 2017
- Objects in Space: April Greiman, Woodbury University Wedge Gallery, Burbank, California, March 4, 2014 – March 30, 2014
- New Works: April Greiman, curated by Stacie B. London, Subvecta Motus Gallery, Glendale, California, November 2012 – January 2013
- Think About What You Think About: April Greiman, Yoon Design: Ddoong Gallery, Korea Society of Basic Design & Art, Seoul, Korea, December 10, 2012 – December 16, 2012
- The Masters Series: April Greiman, School of Visual Arts (SVA) Visual Arts Museum, New York City, New York, October 20, 2008 – December 13, 2008
- Objects in Space, Salve Regina University, Newport, Rhode Island, October 17, 2007 – November 11, 2007
- Drive-by Shooting: April Greiman Digital Photography, Pasadena Museum of California Art, Pasadena, California, September 9, 2006 – October 8, 2006
- Objects in Space, Nova Ljubjlanska Banka, Llubljana, Slovenia, November 2004
- Something from Nothing, Modern Book Gallery, Westwood, California, 2001
- Objects in Space, Selby Gallery, Ringling School of Art and Design, Sarasota, Florida, October 25, 1999 – November 24, 1999
- It'snotwhatAprilyouthinkitGreimanis, Arc en Rêve Centre d'Architecture, Bordeaux, France, 1994.
- Computer Graphics: April Greiman, Itoya Gallery, Tokyo, Japan, 1994.
- April Greiman: Hybrid Imagery, The Israel Museum, Jerusalem, Israel, 1989
- One Woman Show, Turner Dailey Gallery, Los Angeles, California, 1989
- April Greiman, Reinhold–Brown Gallery, New York City, New York, 1986

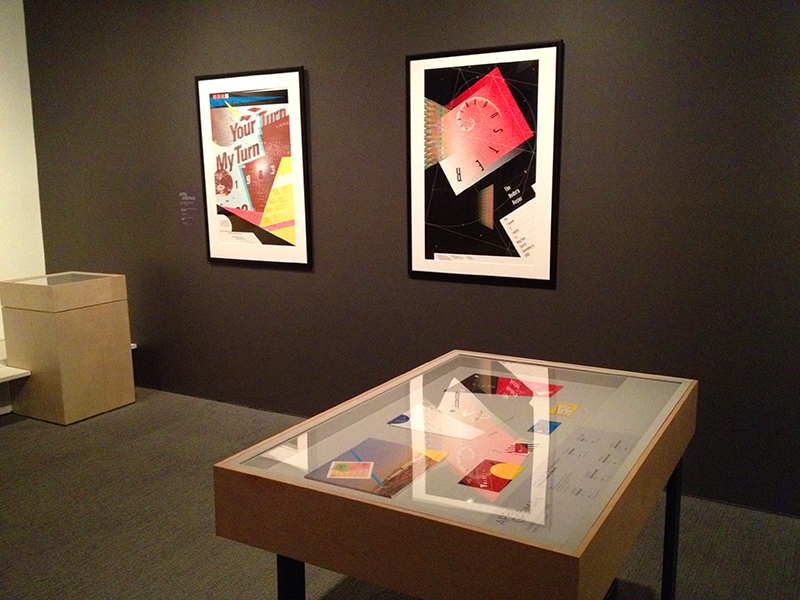
Installation view from group exhibition Designing Modern Women 1890–1990, Museum of Modern Art, (MoMA), New York, NY, October 5, 2013 – October 19, 2014

== Selected group exhibitions ==
- Digital Witness: Revolutions in Design, Photography, and Film, LACMA, Los Angeles, California, presented as part of The Getty initiative PST ART: Art & Science Collide, November 24, 2024 – July 13, 2025
- Body Constructs, MoMA, Collection gallery, organized by Evangelos Kotsioris, Assistant Curator, and Paula Vilaplana de Miguel, New York, New York, January 2024–ongoing
- It's About Time, co-curated with Stacie B. London, Brand Library & Art Center, Glendale Public Library, Glendale, California, September 23 – November 22, 2023
- Between the Lines, Typography in LACMA's Collection, Los Angeles County Museum of Art, Los Angeles, California, May 19, 2019–ongoing
- West of Modernism: California Graphic Design, 1975–1995, Los Angeles County Museum of Art, Los Angeles, California, September 30, 2018 – April 21, 2019
- California: Designing Freedom, Designmuseo, Helsinki, Finland, November 10, 2017 – March 4, 2018
- California: Designing Freedom, The Design Museum, London, England, May 24, 2017 – October 17, 2017
- Static, Castle Fitzjohns Gallery, New York City, New York, 2016–2017
- Typeface to Interface: Graphic Design from the Collection, San Francisco Museum of Modern Art, San Francisco, California, May 14, 2016 – October 23, 2016
- Physical: Sex and the Body in the 1980s, Los Angeles County Museum of Art, Los Angeles, California, March 20, 2016 – July 31, 2016
- Designing Modern Women 1890–1990, Museum of Modern Art, New York City, New York, October 5, 2013 – October 19, 2014
- California's Designing Women: 1896–1986, The Autry Museum, Los Angeles, California, August 10, 2012 – January 6, 2013
- elles@centrepompidou: Women Artists in the Collections of the National Modern Art Museum, Centre Pompidou, Paris, France, May 27, 2009 – February 21, 2011
- Graphic Design: Now in Production, Walker Art Center, Minneapolis, Minnesota, 2011
- Graphic Design in America: A Visual Language History, Design Museum of London, London, England, 1990
- Graphic Design in America: A Visual Language History, IBM Gallery of Science and Art, New York City, New York, 1989
- Design USA, United States Information Agency, Travelling Exhibition throughout the United Socialist Soviet Republic (USSR), 1989
- Graphic Design in America: A Visual Language History, Walker Art Center, Minneapolis, Minnesota, 1989

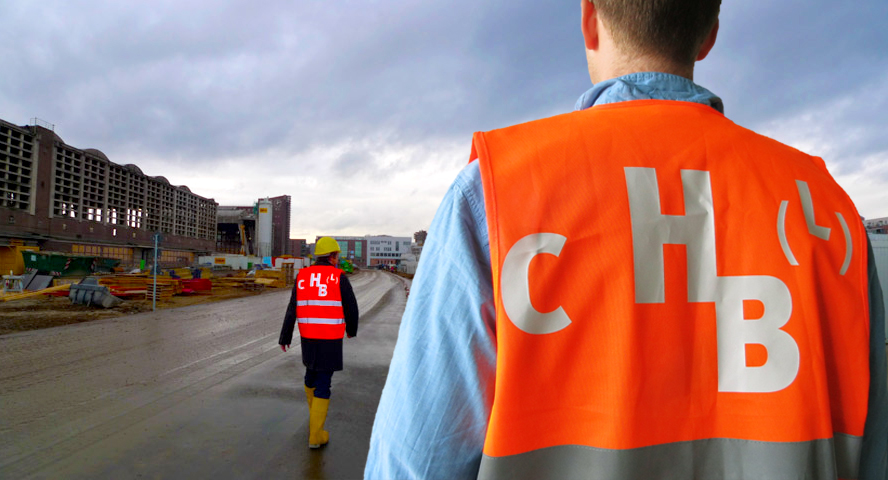
Greiman designed the identity and stationery system for Coop Himmelb(l)au, a cooperative architectural design firm, known for their experimental, complex, and asymmetrical approach to architecture.

== Selected clients ==
- Art Papers, Atlanta, Georgia
- CBRE, Los Angeles, California
- Cerritos Center for the Performing Arts, Cerritos, California
- Coop Himmelb(l)au Architects, Vienna, Austria
- DMJM and AECOM, Los Angeles, California
- Esprit, San Francisco, California
- Fresh and Easy, Los Angeles, California
- Harley Ellis Devereau, Los Angeles, California
- Herman Miller, Los Angeles, California
- Lifetime Television, New York City, New York
- Los Angeles Public Library, Los Angeles, California
- Museum of Applied Arts, Vienna, Austria
- Knoll, Los Angeles, California and New York City, New York
- Southern California Institute of Architecture (SCI-Arc), Los Angeles, California
- Time Warner, New York City, New York
- Vitra, Basel, Switzerland
- Woodbury University School of Architecture, Burbank, California

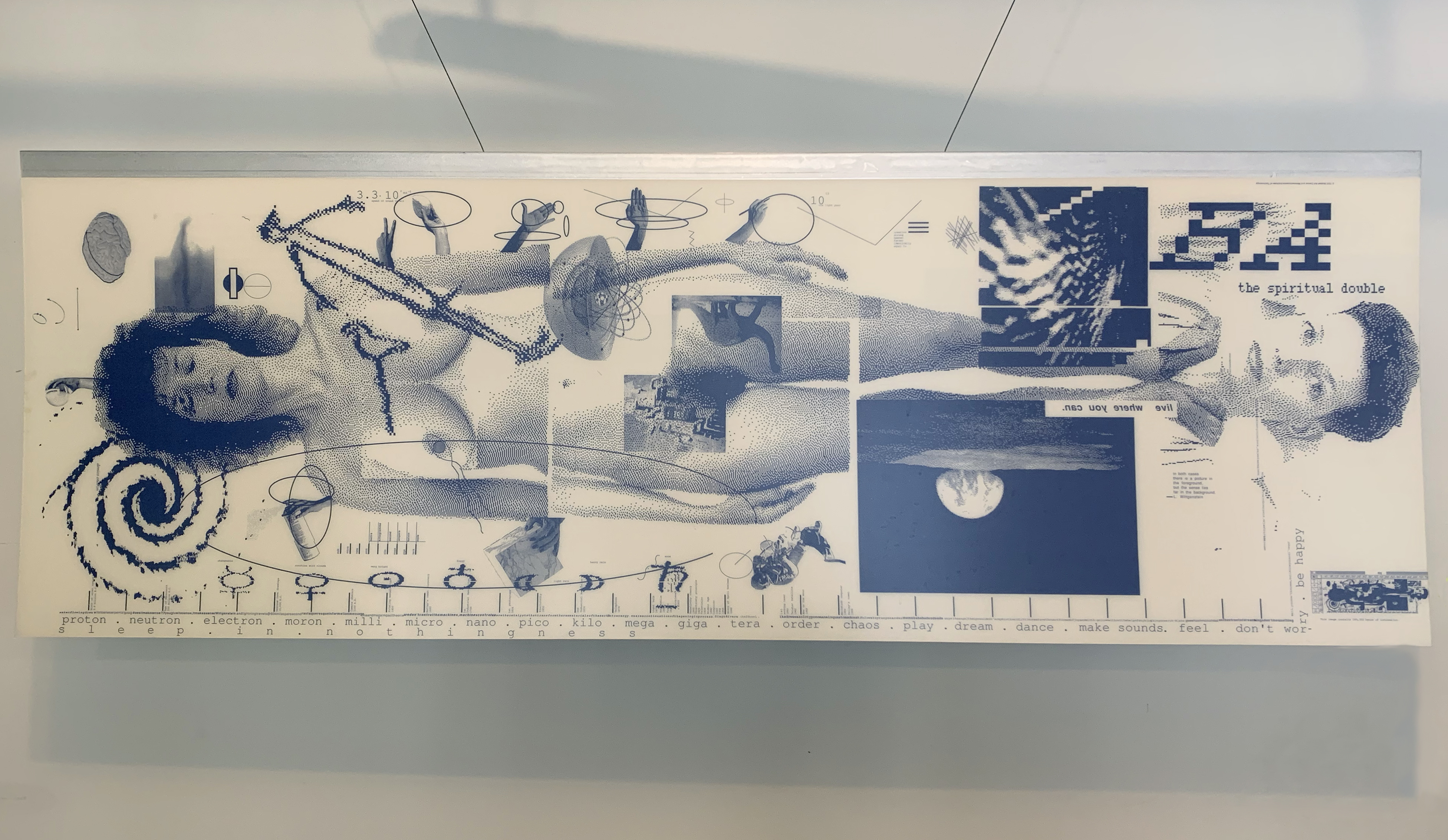
Does It Make Sense?, Greiman, known for her experimental use of media, photographic collage, and still video imagery, was commissioned to create Issue 133 of Design Quarterly, published by the Walker Art Center, 1986.

== Posters ==
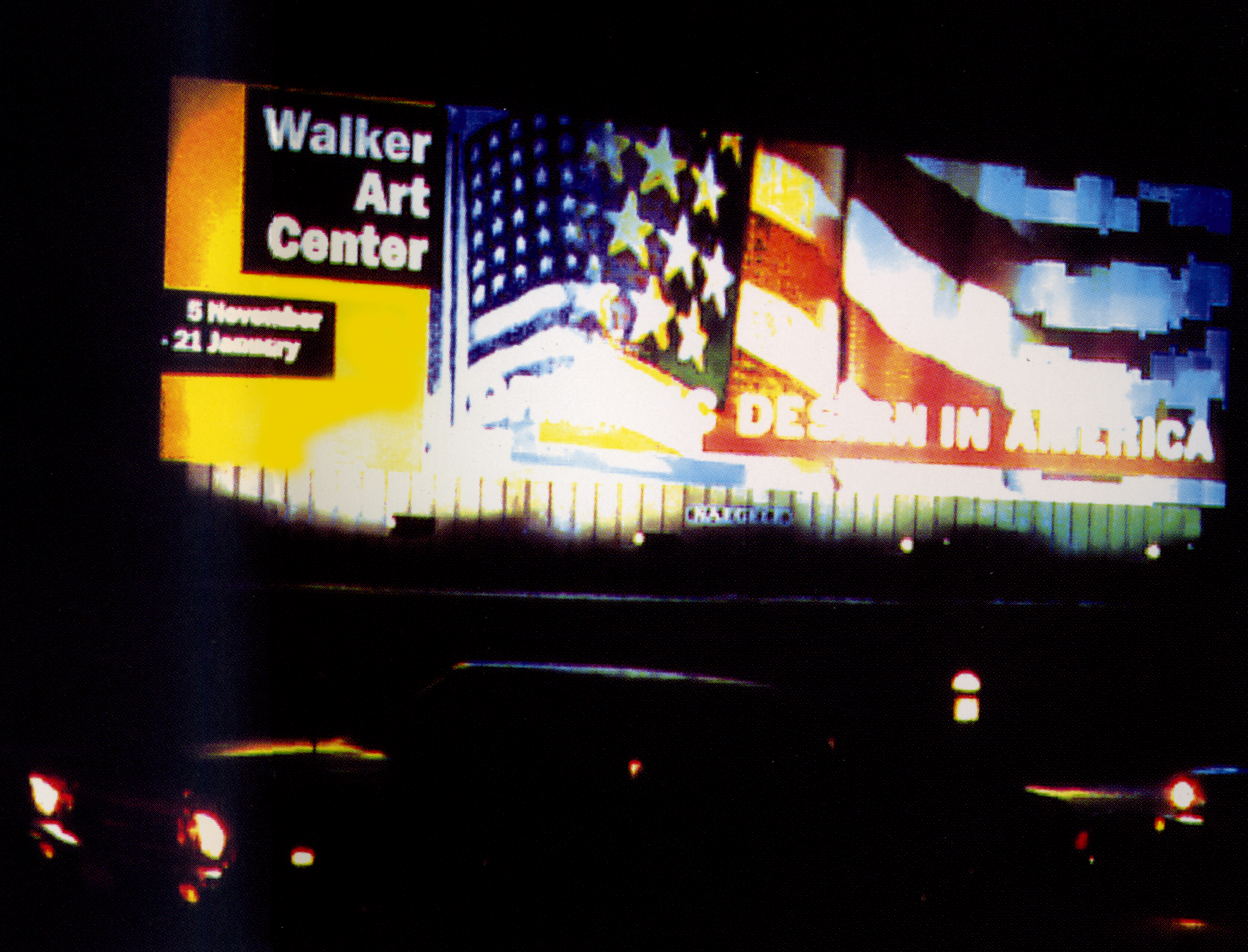
Billboard for the exhibition Graphic Design in America designed Greiman, who was also featured in the traveling exhibition, 1989.

- Cal State Sacramento – Think About What You Think About, 2004
- Samitaur Constructs, 2002
- Objects in Space, Selby Gallery, 1999
- Objects in Space, AIGA/OC, 1999
- The Havana Project, MAK Center, 1996
- Harry Marks, Lifetime Achievement BDA, 1996
- It's Not April What You Think It Is, Exhibition, Bordeaux, 1994
- Pikes Peak Big Fishy, 1994
- AIGA Communication Graphics, 1993
- Sci-Arc Admissions, 1993
- Pikes Peak Lithographing Co., 1992
- UCLA Summer Sessions, 1991
- Sci-Arc Summer Programs, 1991
- Sci-Arc Making Thinking, 1990
- Graphic Design in America, 1989
- The Modern Poster, MOMA, 1988
- Shaping the Future of Healthcare, 1987
- Workspace 1987, 1987
- Pacific Wave, Fortuny Museum, 1987
- LAICA Fashion Show + Clothing Sale, 1986
- Design Quarterly #133: Does it Make Sense, 1986
- Snow White and the Seven Pixels, 1986
- Sci-Arc, Changing Concepts of Space in Architecture and Art, 1986
- Hashi, 1985
- AIGA, California Design 2, 1985
- LA Olympic Games, 1984
- Iris Light, 1984
- Your Turn, My Turn, 3-D, 1983
- CalArts, 1978
- Peter Shire, Swissiyaki, 1978

== See also ==
- List of AIGA medalists
