= Matthew Ritchie =

British artist (born 1964)

Matthew Ritchie (born 1964) is a British artist who currently lives and works in New York City. He attended the Camberwell School of Art from 1983 to 1986. He describes himself as "classically trained" but also points to a minimalist influence. His art revolves around a personal mythology drawn from creation myths, particle physics, thermodynamics, and games of chance, among other elements.

Ritchie is married to Garland Hunter, an artist and actress who appeared in The Tao of Steve.

== Education and early career ==
Matthew Ritchie was born in the suburbs of London in 1964. Ritchie went to St. Paul's School, after which, he moved on to Camberwell School of Art. Ritchie received his BFA from London's Camberwell School of Art, in the years of 1983–1986. He also spent a year enrolled at Boston University in Boston, Massachusetts, in 1982. Ritchie has established himself in the contemporary fine arts scene since the early 1990s, and had his first group exhibition in 1990 at the Judy Nielsen Gallery in Chicago, Illinois. Ritchie's first solo show, "Working Model", was shown in New York's Basilico Fine Arts from 18 February to 18 March in 1995. This series of paintings, wall drawings, and sculptures introduced Ritchie into the contemporary genre as an artist who "brought together historically and ideologically different belief systems in an attempt to show their common thread." Regardless of the medium or material Ritchie uses, all of his work collaborates into a complex meta-narrative structure.

== Art process ==
Ritchie is often seen foremost as a painter, but his work lies mainly in drawing. Ritchie scans his drawings into the computer so he can manipulate them by blowing them up, deconstructing them, and/or transforming them into three-dimensional pieces. He digitally makes his images smaller and larger in order to further develop his ideas beyond paper. In an interview with Art:21, Ritchie explains his drawing process here:

I start with a collection of ideas ... and I draw out all these different motifs, and then I lay them on top of each other. So I have piles of semi-transparent drawings all layered on top of each other in my studio and they form a kind of tunnel of information. Out of that, you can pull this form that turns into the sculpture or the painting. It's literally like pulling the narrative out of overlaying all of the structures. That's how I end up with this structure. It's derived from a series of drawings that I scan into the computer and refine through various processes ... and send to the sheet-metal shop down the road where it's cut out of metal and assembled into larger structures which are too big for my studio.

This method allows Ritchie to reshape his images into sculptures, floor-to-wall installations, interactive web sites, and short stories.

== Art-making philosophy ==
Ritchie draws from numerous meta-narratives that explore religion, philosophy, and science in order to create his complicated, yet freshly simple works. "Influenced by everything from the mythic escapades of comic-book superheroes and pagan gods to the meta-narratives of philosophy, religion, and science, Ritchie has developed a mythical narrative or cosmology of his own, and his art is communicated via a variety of art spaces and installations, including galleries throughout the world and the World Wide Web." In an interview with Art:21, Ritchie stated that he reads Nature magazine, which is a weekly journal that publishes technical articles about contemporary scientific findings. Ritchie's pieces have a scientific nature to them, but do not solely represent scientific agenda. Instead, his work investigates the role of science within society, creating a narrative between order and chaos. In Ritchie's Art:21 interviews, he explains his interest in science as "a way of having a conversation that's based on an idea of looking at things than I am in the rhetoric around science." In other words, Ritchie is not trying to depict scientific data accurately. He uses his research in order to find topics that are important to him, to which he then illustrates in his work. Ritchie's work tends to include various references that expand into a comprehensive explanation historical experience or knowledge. His meta-narratives combine all of the philosophies that interest him, and place them into a structure of information that can be bombarding, but seem to be able to go on endlessly. His work deals with the theme of information. Ritchie explains this theme with a few rhetorical questions and statements: "For me the theme of my new structure was information, how do you deal with it? As a person is it possible for you to grasp everything and see everything? You're presented with everything and all through your life you're trying to filter out, you're really just trying to control that flow." These questions posed by Ritchie rightfully describe his thought process while creating his art, allowing the viewer to better understand his pieces beyond their aesthetic characteristics.

== Interactive work ==
Aside from the artist's gallery work, Ritchie's investigation of New Media has further developed his universal narrative into the interactive realm. In 2001, Ritchie was commissioned by the San Francisco Museum of Modern Art to be a part of e.space, which was created to examine art forms that can only exist on the World Wide Web. Ritchie, along with six other artists: Erik Adigard, Lynn Hershman, Yael Kanarek, Mark Napier, Thomson & Craighead, and Julia Scher, created stories that could only be told through the computer screen. Before his collaboration with the SFMOMA, Ritchie developed his first interactive piece in 1996 with the help of äda 'web, a research and development platform that services artists in order to create online interactive projects. In his piece titled, The Hard Way, Ritchie combines several of his previous projects into an interactive site that allow the viewer to navigate through the website, experiencing the narrative by following Ritchie’s imagined avatars that represent infamous personality traits that can be found throughout our own history. Through his text, drawings, and computer-animated realms, The Hard Way serves as a prequel to his piece with the SFMOMA, titled, The New Place. The New Place was created in 2001, and is entwined with Ritchie’s larger project, Proposition Player. The New Place includes mediums outside the web, using sculpture, painting, computer games, and other forms that are not yet defined in this "very large cross-media plan," serving as a trailer of sorts, previewing things to come. The Proposition Player was created in 2003 for the Massachusetts Museum of Contemporary Art. This piece explores Ritchie’s thoughts on gambling and quantum mechanics, and the illusions that come along with the elements of chance and risk. Ritchie explains the motive behind this piece here in his 2005 interview with Art:21: "It's about the idea that in the moment between placing your bet and the result of the bet there is a kind of infinite freedom because all the possibilities are there. 'You may already be a winner!' It's fantastic—you're like a god! Everything opens up." This exhibition asked the audience to take part, and "play" Ritchie's invented game. Visitors were given a playing card by the exhibition guard, in which they would use to take part within Ritchie's proposition game. Outside of the exhibition's context, these cards could function as a usable deck of cards, since they attribute all of the traditional suits, even including the joker. But in Ritchie’s context, each card symbolized one of the 49 characteristics that Ritchie used to create a story that described the evolution of the entire universe.

== Historical context ==
The compositions of Ritchie's works reference the expressionist artists at the start of the 20th century, but differ from his predecessors in their tightness and linearity. His abstracted narrative work fits into the same category of the work of contemporary artists such as Matthew Barney and Bonnie Collura. Like these two artists, Ritchie draws upon philosophical, religious, and scientific narratives to create a complex universe where these theories can be circulated amongst one another. In these artists' works, webs of data are formed in artistic compositions that reference the questions that society continues to base their meaning of existence on. Ritchie's work personifies these questions into art.

While Ritchie's work depicts contemporary topics and modern-day anxieties, in an interview with the Saint Louis Art Museum, he noted "the idea is to confront and perhaps even transcend the rhetoric of fear that has recently come to dominate all discussions of the future." Ritchie's art has drawn thematic comparisons with artists such as J.M.W. Turner for his introspection on grandeur and apocalypse.

== Connection with new media ==
Ritchie's interactive work is linked to the forerunners of new media, which began to take shape as an art form in the late 1980s. New Media manipulates the medium of digital art, and uses the technology itself as the medium. Through the writings of individuals such as Lev Manovich, Marshall McLuhan, and Roy Ascott, New Media has been defined, and allotted for artists such as Ritchie to explore and create within the realm of interactive art. The interaction between online databases and meta-narrative structures are discussed in Christiane Paul's 2004 essay, "The Database as System and Cultural Form: Anatomies of Cultural Narratives". This essay sheds further light on meta-narrative structure within the premise of New Media. Paul describes this connection here: "databases do lend themselves to a categorization of information and narratives that can then be filtered to create meta-narratives about the construction and cultural specifics of the original material." Similar to past new media artists, Ritchie's interactive works originates from his invented meta-narratives, and are then coded into the online database.

== Major exhibitions ==
Ritchie has had over twenty-five solo exhibitions throughout his career. His first solo show was in 1995, at the Basilico Fine Arts in New York, New York. Ritchie's work has been exhibited at the Dallas Museum of Art; the Contemporary Arts Museum Houston; the Museum of Contemporary Art, North Miami; MASS MoCA; the SFMoMA; The Guggenheim, and the MoMA, among others. His work has also been a part of the 1997 Whitney Biennial, the 2002 Sydney Biennale, and the 2004 São Paulo Art Biennial. Ritchie has also been involved in over 100 group exhibitions since 1990 at an international level.
