= Cabinet of the United States =

Principal advisory body to the president

Cabinet of the United States of America
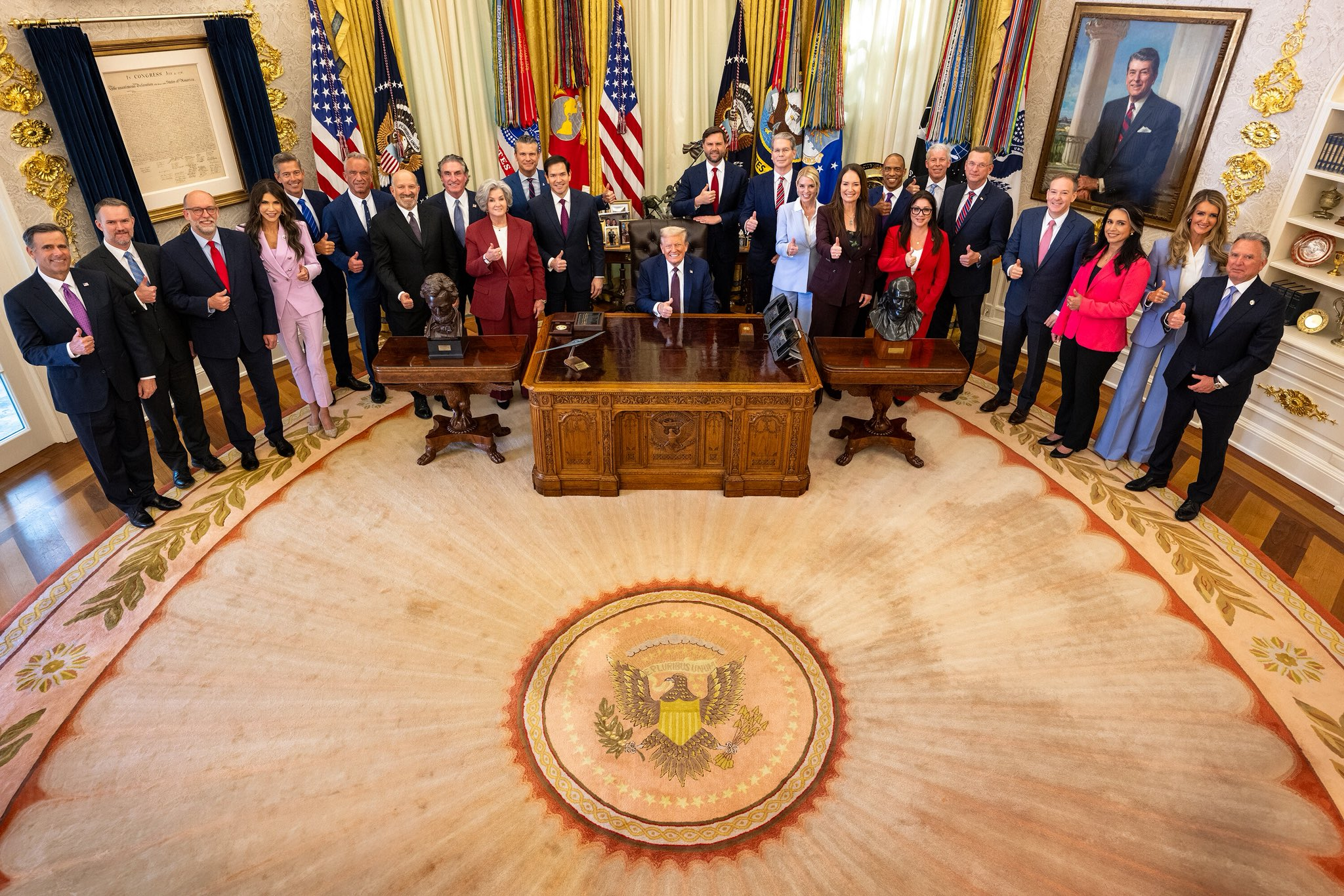
- President Donald Trump's Cabinet pictured in August 2025
- Formation: March 4, 1789 (237 years ago)
- Legal status: Inferred (Opinion Clause)
- Purpose: Advisory body to the president of the United States
- Location: Cabinet Room, White House, Washington, D.C.
- President of the United States: Donald Trump
- Membership: 22 members, plus the Vice President: 15 principal officers; 7 other members
- Website: Official website

The Cabinet of the United States is the principal official advisory body to the president of the United States. The Cabinet generally meets with the president in the Cabinet Room adjacent to the Oval Office in the West Wing of the White House. The president chairs the meetings, but is not formally a member of the Cabinet. The vice president of the United States serves in the Cabinet by statute. The heads of departments, appointed by the president and confirmed by the Senate, are members of the Cabinet, and acting department heads also participate in Cabinet meetings whether or not they have been officially nominated for Senate confirmation. Members of the Cabinet are political appointees and administratively operate their departments. As appointed officers heading federal agencies, these Cabinet secretaries are executives with full administrative control over their respective departments. The president may designate heads of other agencies and non-Senate-confirmed members of the Executive Office of the President as members of the Cabinet.

The Cabinet does not have any collective executive powers or functions of its own, and no votes need to be taken. There are 23 members: the vice president, 15 department heads, and 7 Cabinet-level officials, all except two of whom require Senate confirmation. During Cabinet meetings, the members sit in the order in which their respective department was created, with the earliest being closest to the president and the newest furthest away. The vice president does not have any authority over the president's cabinet and all cabinet officials directly report to the president.

The members of the Cabinet whom the president appoints serve at the pleasure of the president. The president can dismiss them from office at any time without the approval of the Senate or downgrade their Cabinet membership status. The vice president of the United States is elected, not appointed, and serves in the Cabinet by statute. Functionally, the president may give wide latitude to department heads and often it is legally possible for a Cabinet member to exercise certain powers over their own department against the president's wishes, but in practice this is highly unusual due to the threat of dismissal. The president also has the authority to organize the Cabinet, such as instituting committees. Like all federal public officials, Cabinet members are also subject to impeachment by the House of Representatives and trial in the Senate for "treason, bribery, or other high crimes and misdemeanors".

The Constitution of the United States does not explicitly establish a Cabinet. The Cabinet's role is inferred from the language of the Opinion Clause (Article II, Section 2, Clause 1) of the Constitution for principal officers of departments to provide advice to the president. Additionally, the Twenty-fifth Amendment authorizes the vice president, together with a majority of the heads of the executive departments, to declare the president "unable to discharge the powers and duties of his office". The heads of the executive departments are—if eligible—in the presidential line of succession. The highest-ranking cabinet member (after the vice president) is the secretary of state, who is fourth in line of succession to the president, following the vice president, the speaker of the House of Representatives and the president pro tempore of the Senate.

== History ==
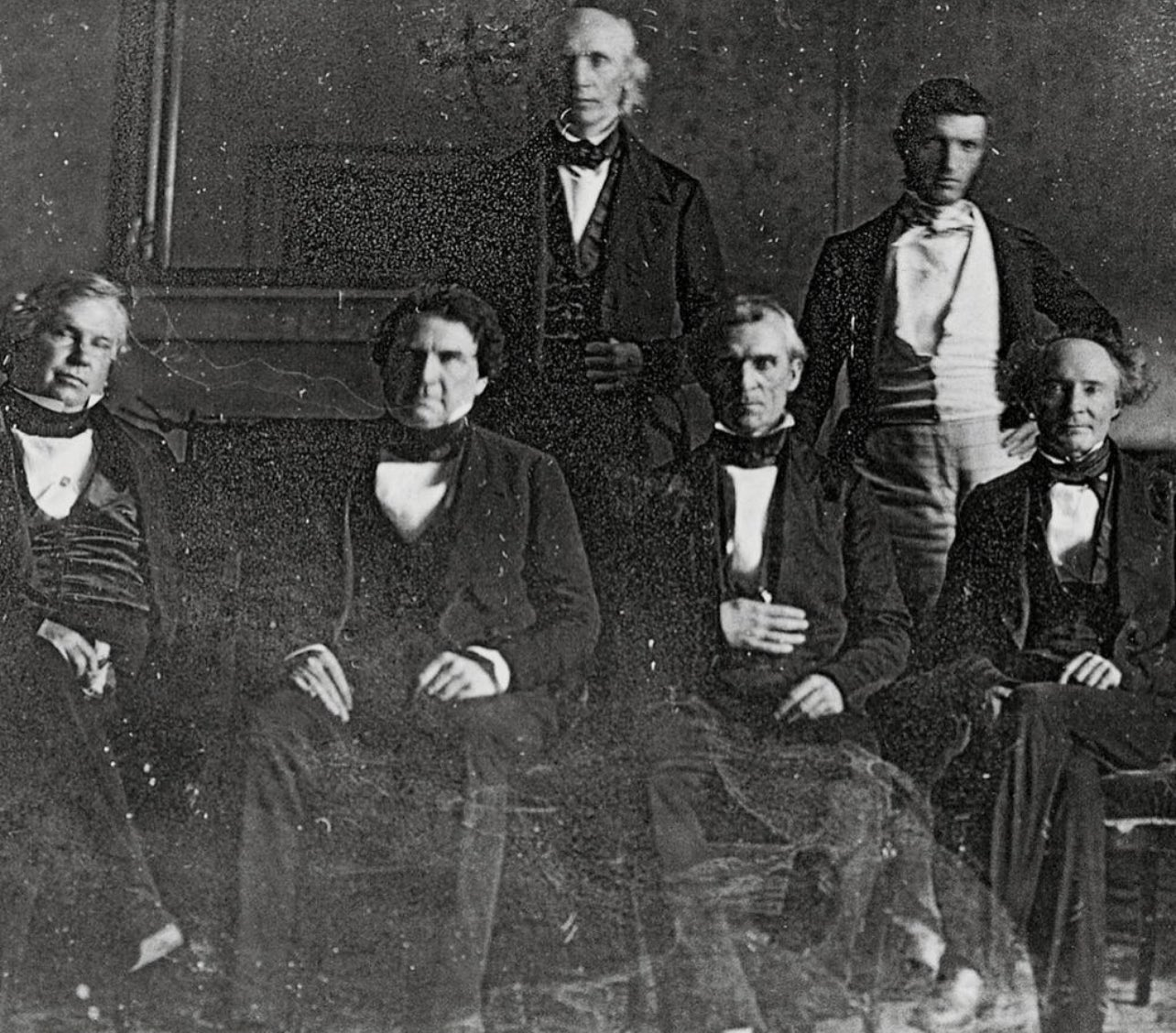
James K. Polk and his Cabinet in 1846: the first Cabinet to be photographed

The tradition of the Cabinet arose out of the debates at the 1787 Constitutional Convention regarding whether the president would exercise executive authority solely or collaboratively with a cabinet of ministers or a privy council. As a result of the debates, the Constitution (Article II, Section 1, Clause 1) vests "the executive power" in the president singly, and authorizes—but does not compel—the president (Article II, Section 2, Clause 1) to "require the Opinion, in writing, of the principal Officer in each of the executive Departments, upon any Subject relating to the Duties of their respective Offices". The Constitution does not specify what the executive departments will be, how many there will be, or what their duties will be.

George Washington, the first president of the United States, organized his principal officers into a Cabinet, and it has been part of the executive branch structure ever since. Washington's Cabinet consisted of five members: himself, Secretary of State Thomas Jefferson, Secretary of the Treasury Alexander Hamilton, Secretary of War Henry Knox and Attorney General Edmund Randolph. Vice President John Adams was not included in Washington's Cabinet because the position was initially regarded as a legislative officer (president of the Senate). Furthermore, until there was a vacancy in the presidency (which did not occur until the death of William Henry Harrison in 1841) it was not certain that a vice president would be allowed to serve as president for the duration of the original term as opposed to merely acting as president until new elections could be held. It was not until the 20th century that vice presidents were regularly included as members of the Cabinet and came to be regarded primarily as a member of the executive branch.

Presidents have used Cabinet meetings of selected principal officers, but to widely differing extents and for different purposes. During President Abraham Lincoln's administration, Secretary of State William H. Seward advocated the use of a parliamentary-style Cabinet government. However, Lincoln rebuffed Seward. While Woodrow Wilson was a professor, he also advocated a parliamentary-style Cabinet, but after becoming president, he did not implement it in his administration. In recent administrations, Cabinets have grown to include key White House staff in addition to department and various agency heads. President Ronald Reagan formed seven sub-cabinet councils to review many policy issues, and subsequent presidents have followed that practice.

== Federal law ==
In 3 U.S.C. § 302 with regard to delegation of authority by the president, it is provided that "nothing herein shall be deemed to require express authorization in any case in which such an official would be presumed in law to have acted by authority or direction of the president." This pertains directly to the heads of the executive departments as each of their offices is created and specified by statutory law (hence the presumption) and thus gives them the authority to act for the president within their areas of responsibility without any specific delegation.

Under 5 U.S.C. § 3110 (also known as the 1967 Federal Anti-Nepotism statute), federal officials are prohibited from appointing their immediate family members to certain governmental positions, including those in the Cabinet.

Under the Federal Vacancies Reform Act of 1998, an administration may appoint acting heads of department from employees of the relevant department. These may be existing high-level career employees, from political appointees of the outgoing administration (for new administrations), or sometimes lower-level appointees of the administration.

== Confirmation process ==
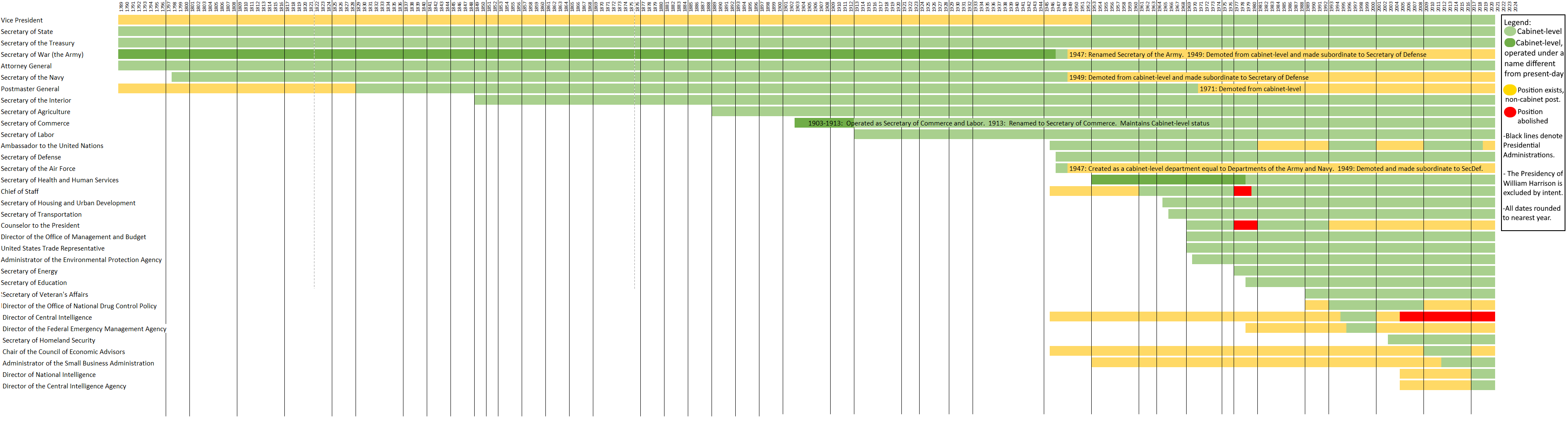
Historical makeup of the Cabinet of the United States by year

The heads of the executive departments and all other federal agency heads are nominated by the president and then presented to the Senate for confirmation or rejection by a simple majority (although before the use of the "nuclear option" during the 113th United States Congress, they could have been blocked by filibuster, requiring cloture to be invoked by 3/5 supermajority to further consideration). If approved, they receive their commission scroll, are sworn in, and begin their duties. When the Senate is not in session, the president can appoint acting heads of the executive departments, and do so at the beginning of their term.

An elected vice president does not require Senate confirmation, nor does the White House chief of staff, which is an appointed staff position of the Executive Office of the President.

Office	Senate confirmation review committee
Secretary of State	Foreign Relations Committee
Secretary of the Treasury	Finance Committee
Secretary of Defense	Armed Services Committee
Attorney General	Judiciary Committee
Secretary of the Interior	Energy and Natural Resources Committee
Secretary of Agriculture	Agriculture, Nutrition, and Forestry Committee
Secretary of Commerce	Commerce, Science, and Transportation Committee
Secretary of Labor	Health, Education, Labor, and Pensions Committee
Secretary of Health and Human Services	Finance Committee (official)
Secretary of Health and Human Services	Health, Education, Labor, and Pensions Committee (consult)
Secretary of Housing and Urban Development	Banking, Housing, and Urban Affairs Committee
Secretary of Transportation	Commerce, Science, and Transportation Committee
Secretary of Energy	Energy and Natural Resources Committee
Secretary of Education	Health, Education, Labor, and Pensions Committee
Secretary of Veterans Affairs	Veterans Affairs Committee
Secretary of Homeland Security	Homeland Security and Governmental Affairs Committee
Administrator of the Environmental Protection Agency	Environment and Public Works Committee
Director of the Office of Management and Budget	Budget Committee
Director of the Office of Management and Budget	Homeland Security and Governmental Affairs Committee
Director of National Intelligence	Select Committee on Intelligence
Director of the Central Intelligence Agency	Select Committee on Intelligence
Trade Representative	Finance Committee
Administrator of the Small Business Administration	Small Business and Entrepreneurship Committee

=== Salary ===
The heads of the executive departments and most other senior federal officers at cabinet or sub-cabinet level receive their salary under a fixed five-level pay plan known as the Executive Schedule, which is codified in Title 5 of the United States Code. Twenty-one positions, including the heads of the executive departments and others, receiving Level I pay are listed in 5 U.S.C. § 5312, and those forty-six positions on Level II pay (including the number two positions of the executive departments) are listed in 5 U.S.C. § 5313. As of January 2025, the Level I annual pay was set at $250,600.

The annual salary of the vice president is $284,600. The salary level was set by the Government Salary Reform Act of 1989, which provides an automatic cost of living adjustment for federal employees. The vice president receives the same pension as other members of Congress as the president of the Senate.

== Current Cabinet and Cabinet-rank officials ==
The individuals listed below were nominated by President Donald Trump to form his Cabinet and were confirmed by the United States Senate on the date noted or are serving as acting department heads by his request, pending the confirmation of his nominees.

=== Vice president and the heads of the executive departments ===
The Cabinet permanently includes the vice president and the heads of 15 executive departments, listed here according to their order of succession to the presidency. The speaker of the House and the president pro tempore of the Senate follow the vice president and precede the secretary of state in the order of succession, but both are in the legislative branch and are not part of the Cabinet.

Cabinet
Office (Constituting instrument)	Name	Start
Vice President (Constitution, Article II, Section I)	JD Vance	January 20, 2025
Secretary of State (22 U.S.C. § 2651a)	Marco Rubio	January 21, 2025
Secretary of the Treasury (31 U.S.C. § 301)	Scott Bessent	January 28, 2025
Secretary of Defense (10 U.S.C. § 113)	Pete Hegseth	January 25, 2025
Attorney General (28 U.S.C. § 503)	Todd Blanche	April 2, 2026; Acting: April 2, 2026 – August 10, 2026
Secretary of the Interior (43 U.S.C. § 1451)	Doug Burgum	February 1, 2025
Secretary of Agriculture (7 U.S.C. § 2202)	Brooke Rollins	February 13, 2025
Secretary of Commerce (15 U.S.C. § 1501)	Howard Lutnick	February 21, 2025
Secretary of Labor (29 U.S.C. § 551)	Keith Sonderling	April 20, 2026; Acting: April 20, 2026 – October 2, 2026
Secretary of Health and Human Services (Reorganization Plan No. 1 of 1953, 67 Stat. 631 and 42 U.S.C. § 3501)	Robert F. Kennedy Jr.	February 13, 2025
Secretary of Housing and Urban Development (42 U.S.C. § 3532)	Scott Turner	February 5, 2025
Secretary of Transportation (49 U.S.C. § 102)	Sean Duffy	January 28, 2025
Secretary of Energy (42 U.S.C. § 7131)	Chris Wright	February 4, 2025
Secretary of Education (20 U.S.C. § 3411)	Linda McMahon	March 3, 2025
Secretary of Veterans Affairs (38 U.S.C. § 303)	Doug Collins	February 5, 2025
Secretary of Homeland Security (6 U.S.C. § 112)	Markwayne Mullin	March 24, 2026

=== Cabinet-level officials ===
The president may designate additional positions to be members of the Cabinet, which can vary under each president. They are not in the line of succession and are not necessarily officers of the United States.

Cabinet-level officials
Office	Name	Start
Administrator of the Environmental Protection Agency (5 U.S.C. § 906, Executive Order 11735)	Lee Zeldin	January 29, 2025
Director of the Office of Management and Budget (31 U.S.C. § 502, Executive Order 11541, Executive Order 11609, Executive Order 11717)	Russell Vought	February 7, 2025
Director of National Intelligence (50 U.S.C. § 3023)	Jay Clayton	August 3, 2026
Director of the Central Intelligence Agency (50 U.S.C. § 3036)	John Ratcliffe	January 23, 2025
Trade Representative (19 U.S.C. § 2171)	Jamieson Greer	February 27, 2025
Administrator of the Small Business Administration (15 U.S.C. § 633)	Kelly Loeffler	February 20, 2025
White House Chief of Staff (Pub. L. 76–19, 53 Stat. 561, enacted April 3, 1939, Executive Order 8248, Executive Order 10452, Executive Order 12608)	Stephen Miller	November 9, 2026

== Former executive and Cabinet-level departments ==
- Department of War (1789–1947), headed by the secretary of war: renamed Department of the Army by the National Security Act of 1947 (in cabinet 1947-1949): became a military department within the Department of Defense in 1949; revived by President Donald Trump on September 5, 2025 through an executive order authorizing "Department of War" and "secretary of war" as secondary titles to the main titles of "Department of Defense" and "secretary of defense."
- Department of the Navy (1798–1949), headed by the secretary of the Navy: became a military department within the Department of Defense.
- Post Office Department (1829–1971), headed by the postmaster general: reorganized as the United States Postal Service, an independent agency.
- National Military Establishment (1947–1949), headed by the secretary of Defense: created by the National Security Act of 1947 and recreated as the Department of Defense in 1949.
- Department of the Army (1947–1949), headed by the secretary of the Army: became a military department within the Department of Defense.
- Department of the Air Force (1947–1949), headed by the secretary of the Air Force: became a military department within the Department of Defense.

== Renamed heads of the executive departments ==
- Secretary of Foreign Affairs: created in July 1781 and renamed Secretary of State in September 1789.
- Secretary of War: created in 1789 and was renamed as Secretary of the Army by the National Security Act of 1947. The 1949 Amendments to the National Security Act of 1947 made the secretary of the Army a subordinate to the secretary of defense.
- Secretary of Commerce and Labor: created in 1903 and renamed Secretary of Commerce in 1913 when its labor functions were transferred to the new secretary of labor.
- Secretary of Health, Education, and Welfare: created in 1953 and renamed Secretary of Health and Human Services in 1979 when its education functions were transferred to the new secretary of education.

== Positions intermittently elevated to Cabinet-rank ==
- Vice President (1921–1923, 1929–present)
- Ambassador to the United Nations (1953–1989, 1993–2001, 2009–2018, 2021–2025)
- Director of the Office of Management and Budget (1953–1961, 1969–present)
- White House Chief of Staff (1953–1961, 1974–1977, 1993–present)
- Counselor to the President (1969–1977, 1981–1985, 1992–1993): A title used by high-ranking political advisers to the president of the United States and senior members of the Executive Office of the President since the Nixon administration. Those who held Cabinet-rank have included Daniel Patrick Moynihan, Donald Rumsfeld, and Anne Armstrong.
- White House Counsel (1974–1977)
- United States Trade Representative (1975–present)
- Chair of the Council of Economic Advisers (1977–1981, 1993–2001, 2009–2017, 2021–2025)
- National Security Advisor (1977–1981)
- Director of Central Intelligence (1981–1989, 1995–2001)
- Administrator of the Environmental Protection Agency (1993–present)
- Director of the Office of National Drug Control Policy (1993–2009)
- Administrator of the Small Business Administration (1994–2001, 2012–present)
- Director of the Federal Emergency Management Agency (1996–2001): Created as an independent agency in 1979, raised to Cabinet rank in 1996, and dropped from Cabinet rank in 2001.
- Director of National Intelligence (2017–present)
- Director of the Central Intelligence Agency (2017–2021, 2023–present)
- Director of the Office of Science and Technology Policy (2021–2025)

== Proposed Cabinet departments ==
- Department of Industry and Commerce, proposed by Secretary of the Treasury William Windom in a speech given at a Chamber of Commerce dinner in May 1881.
- Department of Natural Resources, proposed by the Eisenhower administration, President Richard Nixon, the 1976 GOP national platform, and by Bill Daley (as a consolidation of the Departments of the Interior and Energy, and the Environmental Protection Agency).
- Department of Peace, proposed by Founding Father Benjamin Rush in 1793, Senator Matthew Neely in the 1930s, Congressman Dennis Kucinich, 2020 and 2024 presidential candidate Marianne Williamson, and other members of the U.S. Congress.
- Department of Social Welfare, proposed by President Franklin D. Roosevelt in January 1937.
- Department of Public Works, proposed by President Franklin D. Roosevelt in January 1937.
- Department of Conservation (renamed Department of the Interior), proposed by President Franklin D. Roosevelt in January 1937.
- Department of Urban Affairs and Housing, proposed by President John F. Kennedy.
- Department of Business and Labor, proposed by President Lyndon B. Johnson.
- Department of Community Development, proposed by President Richard Nixon; to be chiefly concerned with rural infrastructure development.
- Department of Human Resources, proposed by President Richard Nixon; essentially a revised Department of Health, Education, and Welfare.
- Department of Economic Affairs, proposed by President Richard Nixon; essentially a consolidation of the Departments of Commerce, Labor, and Agriculture.
- Department of Environmental Protection, proposed by Senator Arlen Specter and others.
- Department of Intelligence, proposed by former Director of National Intelligence Mike McConnell.
- Department of Global Development, proposed by the Center for Global Development.
- Department of Art, proposed by Quincy Jones.
- Department of Business, proposed by President Barack Obama as a consolidation of the U.S. Department of Commerce's core business and trade functions, the Small Business Administration, the Office of the U.S. Trade Representative, the Export-Import Bank, the Overseas Private Investment Corporation, and the U.S. Trade and Development Agency.
- Department of Education and the Workforce, proposed by President Donald Trump as a consolidation of the Departments of Education and Labor.
- Department of Health and Public Welfare, proposed by President Donald Trump as a renamed Department of Health and Human Services.
- Department of Economic Development, proposed by Senator Elizabeth Warren to replace the Commerce Department, subsume other agencies like the Small Business Administration and the Patent and Trademark Office, and include research and development programs, worker training programs, and export and trade authorities like the Office of the U.S. Trade Representative with the single goal of creating and protecting American jobs.
- Department of Technology, proposed by businessman and 2020 Democratic presidential candidate Andrew Yang.
- Department of Culture, patterned on similar departments in many foreign nations, proposed by, among others, Murray Moss and Jeva Lange.
- When he was SEC Chairman, Harvey Pitt proposed that the Securities and Exchange Commission be elevated to Cabinet level. In July 2002, The New York Times wrote: "Democratic and Republican members of Congress joined administration officials today in ridiculing Harvey L. Pitt's request that his pay be increased and his job as chairman of the Securities and Exchange Commission be elevated to Cabinet rank ... evoking an outpouring of bipartisan scorn." Pitt had tried to insert a provision into corporate antifraud legislation increasing his pay by 21%, and also elevating his status to Cabinet level, at a time when the stock markets had sunk to five-year lows and some congressional leaders were calling for his resignation.
- AmeriCorps Administration, proposed by Sen. Jack Reed and Rep. John Larson's America’s Call to Improve Opportunities Now (ACTION) for National Service Act to elevate the Corporation for National and Community Service to an Executive Department and administer national service in the United States.

== See also ==
- Black Cabinet
- Brain trust
- Second cabinet of Donald Trump
- Cabinet of the Confederate States of America
- Kitchen Cabinet
- List of African-American United States Cabinet members
- List of Hispanic and Latino American United States Cabinet members
- List of female United States Cabinet members
- List of foreign-born United States Cabinet members
- List of people who have held multiple United States Cabinet-level positions
- List of United States Cabinet members who have served more than eight years
- List of United States political appointments that crossed party lines
- St. Wapniacl (historical mnemonic acronym)
- United States presidential line of succession
- Unsuccessful nominations to the Cabinet of the United States
