= Jayme Odgers =

American artist

Jayme Odgers (born 1939) was an artist, photographer and graphic designer. He was best known for his new wave design and experimental collage photography of the 1980s.

== Biography ==
Jayme Odgers
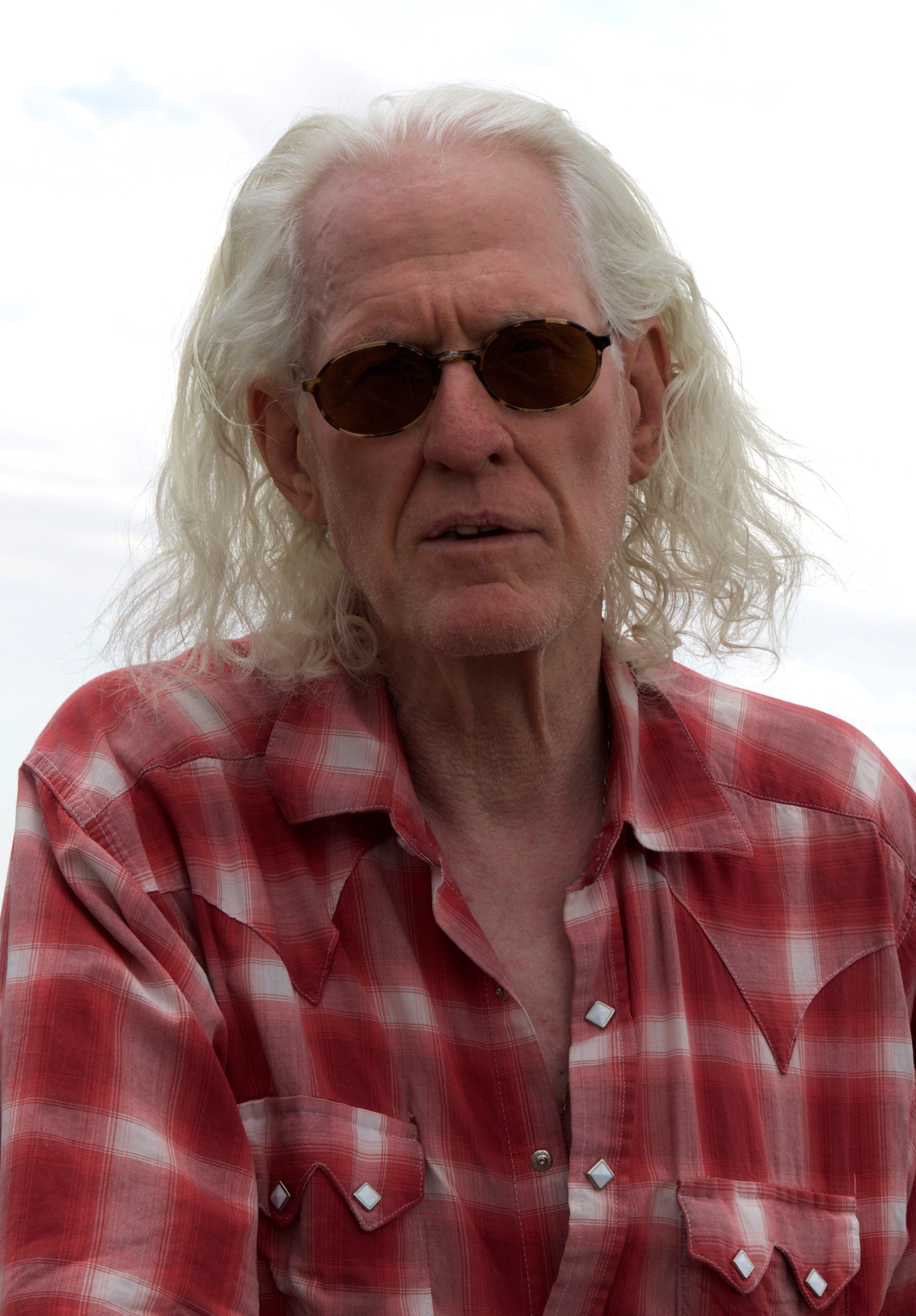
- Courtesy the artist
- Born: 1939; Butte, Montana
- Died: 2022 (aged 82); Santa Monica, California
- Education: Art Center College of Design
- Known for: painting, photography and graphic design

Jayme Odgers graduated from Los Angeles’ Art Center College of Design with a bachelor's degree in Art in 1962. After graduating, and later became Paul Rand's assistant.

In the late 1970s Jayme Odgers played an instrumental role in establishing a new look for California design, work that was included in the exhibition Pacific Waves at the Museo Fortuny in Venice, Italy. In the 1980s, he worked with April Greiman to create posters for the 1984 Summer Olympics and the 100th anniversary of the Swiss publisher Thieme. Odgers' work has been shown at the Museum of Modern Art in San Francisco, the Brooklyn Museum, the Arco Center for the Visual Arts and the Montreal Museum of Fine Arts. Examples were included in the Walker Art Center's landmark show, Posters of the Centuries: Design of the Avant Garde, and reside in the permanent collections of the Smithsonian Cooper-Hewitt National Design Museum, Victoria and Albert Museum and The White House. He has amassed over 100 design awards, including gold medals from the Art Directors Clubs of New York and Los Angeles, and an international Typomundus Award for typography. Odgers' work is also included in the permanent collection of LACMA.
