= Karl Kani =

Costa Rican fashion designer

- Born: Carl Williams; May 23, 1968 (age 58); Limón, Costa Rica
- Occupation: Fashion designer
- Years active: 1989–present
- Label: Karl Kani
- Website: www.karlkani.com

Karl Kani (/kəˈnaɪ/; born Carl Williams; May 23, 1968) is a fashion designer, and the founder and CEO of the eponymous hip hop fashion brand Karl Kani.

== Biography ==
=== Early life ===
Carl Williams was born in Costa Rica to a Panamanian father and Costa Rican mother, both of Jamaican descent. The family migrated to the United States in the late 1960s, and he grew up in Flatbush, Brooklyn.

=== Early career ===
At age 16, Williams started designing clothes after learning the essential handcraft at his father's company. He never studied tailoring or design, but he would buy material and tell a tailor exactly how he wanted his garments to look, enabling him to have "fresh outfit(s) that nobody (else) had." Eventually, people who saw him wearing these outfits in clubs began asking for Carl Williams clothes of their own, and he began taking orders for them.

In 1989 he went to Los Angeles, where he and a friend opened a clothing shop on Crenshaw Boulevard. They made no profit at this location, and after the shop was robbed, they moved to Hollywood, where he started selling catalogs for $2 that he and his partner had put together. They only made profit from the catalog sales and did not sell any clothes. He decided to take out an advertisement in Right On! Magazine, but that did not jumpstart sales.

== Brand name ==
Karl Kani
- Type: Private
- Industry: Fashion
- Founded: Los Angeles, United States (1989)
- Founder: Carl Williams
- Products: Apparel and accessories
- Website: www.karlkani.com

Williams chose the name "Kani" as a derivative of "can I", in reference to the questions he asked himself about success at the beginning of his career (e.g., "Can I do it?")

In 1989 Karl Kani was launched as a hip hop fashion brand. He was inspired by his passion for hip hop music and fashion and decided to design clothes that appealed to a large public, including friends and celebrities from his hometown Brooklyn, New York.

=== Karl Kani Infinity ===
After watching The Today Show, Kani had the idea of paying a friend in New York to make a sign with his label's name on it and hold it up during the taping of the show. The idea worked as people started calling and orders began to come in.

Kani modified the baggy pants that had become popular in street fashion. According to him, black people never liked tight-fitting jeans. They would always buy a bigger size but then the waist would be too big, so he decided to increase the pant size.

In 1994, Kani used $500,000 in profits to launch his company "Karl Kani Infinity". In addition to his old partners, Kani now faced a marketing onslaught from hip-hop entrepreneur Russell Simmons's Phat Farm and a number of mainstream clothiers. He also had reason to worry that his involvement in Cross Colours might taint his operation in the minds of retailers. "I expected some resistance", Kani said. "A major turning point for me was when retailers accepted us back into the market."

Staying ahead of fashion counterfeiters who aped his signature and sold cheaper versions of his clothes, Kani began fastening a metal-and-leather plate to his product. After some resistance from the people who made the plates, Kani decided to go ahead with it and it turned out to be his best-selling jeans ever.

=== Karl Kani Big & Tall ===
The idea for the big & tall line came to Kani after numerous conversations with National Basketball Association stars, who complained that they could not fit into much of his merchandise. Big and tall people may be just as fashion-conscious as anyone else, so Kani launched his line in mid-1995 in big & tall stores around the country.

=== Kani Ladies ===
Kani Ladies is a fashion label for young women launched in 2001 as a sister of the brand Karl Kani. Kani Ladies started with a small urban collection next to the men’s collection and was sold in the same stores as Karl Kani. In the following years, Kani Ladies evolved into an independent label for young women. Kani Ladies offers a wide range of jeans, dresses, shorts, tops and more. Besides clothing, the brand also includes jewelry, bags and shoes. In 1998 Kani Ladies launched its first European collection. What started as a small collection next to the Karl Kani men collection has since evolved into an independent fashion label. The brand has been featured in fashion magazines like Cosmogirl, Elle Girl, and Glamour, and TV shows like the Idols franchise.

== Legacy ==
Kani has been called "The godfather of hip-hop clothes", and paved the way for other hip hop fashion brands. He spotted an area in the market that had been ignored and paved the way for other hip hop fashion brands. He was the fashion choice of rap superstar Tupac Shakur who in 1994 did a campaign for the fashion label and did not charge for his time.

== Awards ==
Black Enterprise magazine named Karl Kani Infinity Corporation the most successful Black owned firm worldwide in 1996.

In 2002, Kani was honored with an Urban Fashion Pioneer Award for his lifetime achievements, at the Urban Fashion Awards.
