= St. Wapniacl =

St. Wapniacl is a mnemonic which was used for decades to help remember the offices of the U.S. Cabinet, in their order of creation and importance. The cabinet offices referred to by the mnemonic were State, Treasury, War, Attorney General, Postmaster General, Navy, Interior, Agriculture, Commerce, and Labor.

== Obsolescence ==
This mnemonic has been obsolete since 1947 when the Departments of War and the Navy were combined into the Department of Defense by the National Security Act of 1947.

The usefulness of this mnemonic has been further eroded by the following changes to the U.S. cabinet since 1947:

- In 1953, the Department of Health, Education, and Welfare was created.
- In 1965, the Department of Housing and Urban Development was formed.
- In 1966, the Department of Transportation was created.
- In 1971, the Postmaster General ceased to be a cabinet-level position.
- In 1977, the Department of Energy was formed.
- In 1979, the Department of Health, Education, and Welfare was divided into the Department of Education and Department of Health and Human Services.
- In 1988, the Department of Veterans Affairs was created.
- In 2003, the Department of Homeland Security was created.

Although obsolete for over 70 years, St. Wapniacl can still be found to be referenced on occasion, such as in John Updike's The Centaur.

== Suggestions for replacement ==
A 1988 editorial in The New York Times first suggested a new mnemonic which has later been revised to become: "See The Dog Jump In A Circle; Leave Her House To Entertain Educated Veterans' Homes", corresponding to the names of the departments of State, Treasury, Defense, Justice (headed by the Attorney General), Interior, Agriculture, Commerce, Labor, Health and Human Services, Housing and Urban Development, Transportation, Energy, Education, Veterans Affairs, and Homeland Security.

A similar mnemonic exists for the Cabinet level positions: Emit U.E.S.S.C. It stands for Environment, Management and Budget, Intelligence, Trade, United Nations, Economic Advisors, Small Business, Science and Technology, and Chief of Staff, each of which roughly describes the jurisdiction of their positions.

== See also ==
- List of mnemonics
- Saint Grottlesex
