= Achva Benzinberg Stein =

Achva Benzinberg Stein is a landscape architect, a founding principal of the landscape architecture and design firm Benzinberg Stein Associates. She is also the founding director of the Graduate Program in Landscape Architecture at City College of New York Spitzer School of Architecture.

== Background and education ==
Stein grew up in Israel just outside Tel Aviv. She came to the United States in 1965 to attend the University of California Berkeley, where she earned a Bachelor of Arts in Landscape Architecture. She went on to earn a Master of Arts in Landscape Architecture from the Massachusetts Institute of Technology and Harvard University.

== Professional work ==
Stein was the Chair of the Department of Landscape Architecture at North Carolina State University from 2000 to 2005. In 2005, Stein founded the Graduate Program in Landscape Architecture at the Spitzer School of Architecture, City College of New York, and served as Chair from 2005 to 2013. She was awarded the Teacher of the Year Award at City College for the academic year 2011–2012. She also served as director of the City College Architectural Center.

Stein is also a principal at Benzinberg Stein Associates and a Fellow of the American Society of Landscape Architects since her nomination in 2003 in the category of Knowledge. Her design work is focused on ensuring that human-built structures respond to and do not dominate the natural environment. She also focuses on working with communities to create community-sensitive designs. Of particular interest to her is design that addresses destruction that resulted from past planning. Urban renewal could be an example of such destruction.

Stein's academic and design work is indeed considered notable in the field of community-led design. She and Norman Millar have documented the use of urban agriculture in inner-city neighborhoods for community benefit. She and Millar used this method in Windows of Opportunity, a program they created in Los Angeles. In the program, vacant areas such as parking lots and former industrial spaces become play spaces, non-food urban gardens, and solar fields. Communities used the program to create landscapes that would directly meet their needs. In 1995, Stein based her design for Uhuru Gardens in East Los Angeles directly on community input, including stated desires for a mini-forest, a freedom tree, outdoor instruction, a community garden, a marketplace where locals could sell produce, and an African forest area with a pond. For her work, she received the American Society of Landscape Architect's Community Service Award in 2010.

Another major part of Stein's academic work is research on Middle-Eastern and Mediterranean landscape design. Stein is the author of Morocco: Courtyards and Gardens. The book studies different types of Moroccan gardens, agricultural landscapes, gardens of mosques and schools, and residential gardens and explores how Morocco's history, mishmash of cultures, and natural landscape contribute to common design motifs. Because of her research, she joined the team putting together The Metropolitan Museum of Art's "New Galleries for the Art of the Arab Lands, Turkey, Iran, Central Asia, and Later South Asia" in 2011. Her role was primarily focused on directing construction of a fourteenth-century Moroccan courtyard inside the museum. She also has studied the role of sacred trees in the landscapes of Northern Israel's historic shrines and proposed methods for their preservation; she is cited in other works on the role of trees in Israel's historic cultures.

=== Major publications ===
Morocco: Courtyards and Gardens (Monacelli Press, 2007)

"Windows of opportunity: Reprogramming residual urban space." Landscape Journal 17 (special issue, 1998): 8–11. (With Norman Millar)

"Uhuru Gardens and Mini-Parks." Landscape Architecture 82, No. 6 (1992): 55–61.

"Landscape Elements of the Makam: Sacred Places of Israel." Landscape Journal, Vol. 6, No. 2 (1987): 123–131.

=== Selected awards ===
- City College Teacher of the Year Award (2011-2012)
- ASLA 2010 Community Service Award
- Certificate of Commendation for Service to the Community City of Los Angeles (1999)
- University of Southern California Associates Award for Excellence in Teaching.
- Chrysler Award for Innovation in Design (1994)
