= Cross Colours =

US clothing brand

- Type: Private
- Industry: Fashion
- Founded: Los Angeles, California, U.S. (1989)
- Founder: Carl Jones
- Products: Apparel and accessories
- Website: crosscoloursla.com

Cross Colours is a clothing brand launched in 1989 by Carl Jones. Launched on the premise of producing "clothes without prejudices" Cross Colours helped establish a fashion market based around black youth. The clothing was used to broadcast political and social messages.

== History ==
Cross Colours was the brainchild of Carl Jones the entrepreneur who studied fashion at Otis Parson's School of Design and Trade Technical College in Los Angeles, then worked in various fashion enterprises before starting his own T-shirt company.

He eventually started a company called Surf Fetish, which rode the wave of beachwear trends. He also hired Thomas Walker, a graphic designer who would eventually become vice president of Cross Colours. For Jones, Cross Colours was a way to broadcast political and social messages-such as denouncing gangs or calling for racial unity-to the African American community, and eventually other communities as the clothes' popularity spread.

The label, whose baseball caps, baggy jeans, and message-bearing T-shirts were to prove influential, also introduced such future designers as Karl Kani.

The brand was overly dependent on sales through one national chain Merry-Go-Round. Cross Colours was hit hard by the retailers over expansion and bankruptcy.

In 2014 Cross Colours made a fresh start as a multistyle street fashion label. Cross Colours does not specifically target the African-American youth but targets a broader multicultural group. The original mission, to make clothes without prejudice, was incorporated into a broader mission.

The brand is currently owned and operated by its original founders Carl Jones and TJ Walker.

== Cross Colours philosophy ==
Cross Colours pushes the message, "Clothing Without Prejudice", a slogan that appears on every garment. Since they were primarily targeting African-American youth they wanted to inspire them with positive messages like "Stop D Violence" and "Educate 2 Elevate".

== Product ==
Cross Colours is one of the first companies to make urban gear fashionable. It set out to harness the hip-hop craze with a line of street-inspired fashions for young men. Its products are sold by more than 3,000 retail outlets.

The hype started with affordable brightly colored T-shirts, jackets and caps, each accompanied by messages like "Stop D Violence" and "Educate 2 Elevate." Hip teenagers latched onto the stuff, which soon showed up on the backs of rappers and sitcom stars.

== Distribution ==
Cross Colours was relaunched in the US for Spring/Summer 2014. The collection is available at retailers such as Jimmy Jazz, DTLR, Sheikh Shoes, Zumiez, and Nordstrom.
