= Erik Adigard =

American designer

Erik Adigard des Gautries (born 1953), is a Congolese-born French and American communication designer, multimedia artist, and educator. He is based in the San Francisco Bay Area, and a co-founder of M-A-D, a Berkeley-based design firm. Adigard is a former design contributor and art director to Wired magazine.

== Biography ==
Adigard was born in Republic of the Congo where his French father was stationed, as a French foreign correspondent. His grandfather is Jean Adigard des Gautries, a noted French historian and a Legion of Honour recipient. When Adigard was ten his family returned to Paris.

He began his university studies in English literature, semiotics, and fine arts in France, before coming to the United States to obtain a BFA degree (1987) in graphic design at California College of the Arts (CCA).

While a student, Adigard's first designs earned him national awards for their experimental mix of iconography and offset printing techniques. Upon graduation, with Patricia McShane, he established M-A-D—also known as "madxs", a brand and communications design studio. Since creating his first digital images for Macworld magazine in 1989 he has been exploring the limits of the graphic design discipline as it continues to be redefined by shifting relationships with technology and social phenomena. His activities range from branding, print, web, video and multimedia, to consulting and exhibits—always with a concern for conceptual accuracy and creative innovation.

In 1992 he participated in the launch of Wired magazine by conceiving its first visual essay, and then continued to develop a visual vernacular specific to Wired and often labeled "Wired look". In 1996-1998 he served as design director for WiredVentures where he designed new web offerings, including the Hotbot search engine, WiredNews and the ground breaking LiveWired.

His short documentary, Webdreamer, a portrait of fellow web designers, was featured in international film festivals such as RESfest and the Sundance Film Festival.

In 1999 he co-authored Architecture Must Burn with Aaron Betsky.

From 2000 until 2004 Adigard developed brand strategy for IBM software, creating a graphic system that allowed for five distinct brands; DB2, Lotus, Tivoli, Rational, and Websphere, to combine into an integrated offering. This brand system included a visual campaign that was in continual use throughout the decade.

AirXY: From Immaterial to Rematerial was a 2008 immersive multimedia installation incorporating digital, architectural, light and sound effects to form spaces and architecture that disappears as quickly as it is formed. This concept, by Erik Adigard and artist Chris Salter was directed by former San Francisco Museum of Modern Art design and architecture curator Aaron Betsky. This work was commissioned by the Venice Architecture Biennale.

Since 2011 Adigard has been teaching in the undergraduate and MFA design program at California College of the Arts in San Francisco and Paris, France.

== Exhibitions ==
Among many exhibits, his main commissions include Catalysts!, Engage for ExperimentaDesign2005, Bienal de Lisboa and AirXY: From Immaterial to Rematerial for the Venice Biennale of Architecture 2008.

At the Venice Biennale of Architecture 2012 Adigard created the graphic design and a floor exhibit for Spontaneous Interventions, the American Pavilion installation that was awarded a special mention for National Participation by the Biennale Jury.

Adigard's creations have been shown in major international exhibitions, film festivals and publications, such as the Sundance Film Festival, the Pasadena Museum of Art, the Denver Art Museum, the San Francisco Museum of Modern Art, the Smithsonian Cooper-Hewitt National Design Museum, the Wellcome Trust in London, the Toronto Pearson International Airport (2008), and Meggs’ History of Graphic Design.

== Awards ==
Among his top awards is The Chrysler Award for Innovation in Design in 1998.

Erik Adigard was the 2012–2013 American Academy in Rome, Katherine Edwards Gordon Rome Prize Fellow in Design.

== Memberships ==
He belongs to the Alliance Graphique Internationale and from 2009 to 2011 was a board member of Adobe Design Achievement Awards. Other academic activities include advising and teaching in graphic design, media design and architecture, and lecturing in the US and abroad on emerging design subjects.
