= Murray Moss =

American art entrepreneur

- Born: c. 1949 (age c. 76); Chicago, United States
- Education: Columbia University (BA); New York University (MFA)
- Occupation(s): Entrepreneur, designer, author, and artist
- Known for: Co founder of design art company Moss shop
- Partner: Franklin Edward Getchell
- Website: www.mossbureau.com

Murray Moss (born c. 1949) is an American entrepreneur and founder of the design art company Moss, as well as the design consultancy Moss Bureau. He is best known for his curation of objects and design style.

== Early life and education ==
Moss was born in Chicago around 1949 and studied at Columbia University and the New York University, School of the Arts.

== Career ==
Following his studies, he began his career as a professional actor in the United States and Great Britain.

In 1978, in collaboration with Dutch designer Ronaldus Shamask, Moss launched the fashion label Shamask, which became known for its architectural and structural qualities—then, a pioneering approach to clothing design. The company rapidly expanded to include broad manufacturing of women's and men's fashions, with international distribution and licensing. In 1990, its trademarks and trade names were sold.

The Moss shop, which opened in 1994 in New York's SoHo neighborhood, embodied principles of its namesake owner's prior careers. A sense of theatricality, reminiscent of experimental fashion, characterized the shop, which presented a curated selection of current and historical products, culled from designers and manufacturers around the world. Moss changed the presentation of products almost daily, keeping the store fresh with new ideas.

In 2000, Moss and his business/life partner, Franklin Edward Getchell, expanded the store considerably by annexing two floors of the adjacent former art gallery, previously known as Metro Pictures. In January 2005, the store expanded yet again into a new corner building beside the existing two Moss shops, there launching Moss Gallery, a “theater-like” venue for regularly scheduled special exhibitions. In May 2006, with partner-restaurateur Nicola Marzovilla, the business expanded yet again, adding an Italian restaurant and wine shop. Also in 2006, the company hit the West Coast with a store on Melrose Avenue in Los Angeles and, in 2008, with a Moss shop in the Philippe Starck-designed SLS Hotel at Beverly Hills.

In the wake of economic recession, however, all the Moss shops and galleries closed by early 2012. At that juncture, the Moss Bureau was founded—a consultancy that purposefully "intervenes" in museum-retail operations, while also offering curatorial and other advisory services.

== Recognition ==
Moss is the recipient of the 2002 Chrysler Design Award and Russel Wright Award. In 2000, he received House Beautiful's Giants of Design Award and, in 2004, the Metropolitan Home Modernism Award. In 2007, he was chosen for the Travel & Leisure award for Best New Restaurant Design for Centovini. That same year, he was elected to Interior Design magazine's Hall of Fame.

He has been a frequent guest lecturer at design venues and universities, including the Harvard Graduate School of Design, Yale School of Architecture, Hammer Museum, Aspen Institute, Cooper Hewitt Museum, and the TED conference (2002). He is on the graduate faculty of the School of Visual Arts. The three books he has authored include two published by Rizzoli: Georg Jensen Reflections and Baccarat: 250 Years, and Tertium Quid for August Editions.
