= Allan Wexler =

American artist (born 1949)

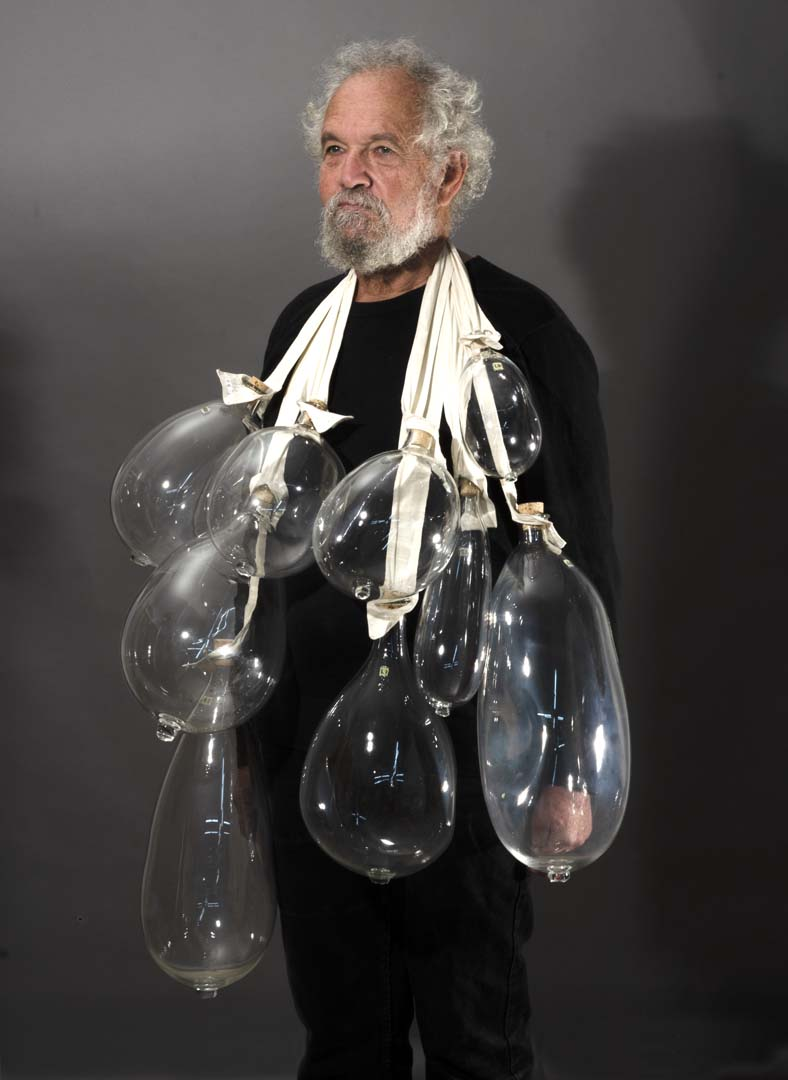
- Allan Wexler's Portrait
- Born: March 30, 1949 (age 76); Bridgeport, Connecticut
- Education: 1976 Pratt Institute, Master of Architecture 1972 Rhode Island School of Design, Bachelor of Architecture 1971 Rhode Island School of Design, Bachelor of Fine Arts
- Known for: Contemporary Artist Sculpture, Public Art, Multimedia
- Spouse: Ellen Schwartz Wexler
- Awards: Guggenheim Fellowship, Rome Prize, Chrysler Award for Design Innovation
- Website: allanwexlerstudio.com

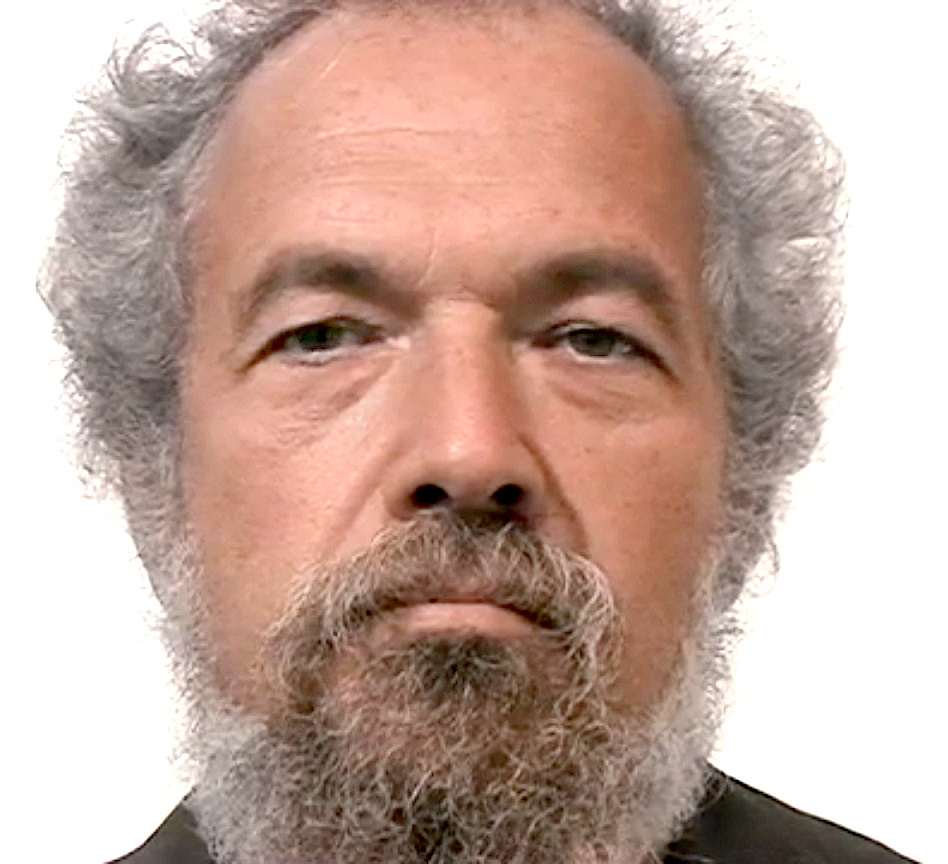
Allan Wexler in Speaking Portraits

Allan Wexler (born 1949) is an American interdisciplinary artist and educator. Wexler works with sculpture, photography and photo-based drawings.

== Early life and education ==
Wexler was born in Bridgeport, Connecticut in 1949. He received a Bachelor of Fine Arts in 1971 and a Bachelor of Architecture in 1972, both from the Rhode Island School of Design. He holds a Master of Architecture degree from the Pratt Institute.

Wexler entered the Rhode Island School of Design to study architecture. Wexler moved to New York City in 1973.

== Career ==
After school he set up a studio in New York City. His studio practice includes sculpture, installations, museum interventions, painting, drawing, writing, and design.

Wexler's work is exhibited both in the United States and internationally. Included among his recent exhibitions and public works are SACRA Buffalo, New York 2019, Parrish Art Museum, Water Mill, NY 2019, the Wheaton Art Center, Millville, Emanations 2019, the Mattress Factory, Pittsburgh, PA, 2017

Wexler has taught fine art, design, and architecture for over 40 years, currently on the faculty of Parsons School of Design in New York City. He has taught, and lectured internationally for most of his career including at Pratt Institute, New Jersey Institute of Technology, Rhode Island School of Design, Bauhaus School of Architecture, Design Academy Eindhoven, Cooper Union School of Fine Arts, Brown University.

Wexler has worked collaboratively with his partner and wife Ellen Wexler; a 2006 sculpture by the pair is installed at the Hudson River Park in New York City.
