= Mildred Friedman =

American architecture

Mildred "Mickey" Friedman (née Shenberg; July 25, 1929 – September 3, 2014) was an American architecture and design curator and editor of the journal Design Quarterly.

== Biography ==
Friedman, née Shenberg, was born in Los Angeles to Nathaniel and Hortense Schenberg. After majoring in design at University of California, Los Angeles, she taught design at Los Angeles City College before moving with her husband to Minneapolis in 1958. She was hired by the Walker Art Center as a design consultant in 1969.

Friedman was promoted to Curator of Design in 1979, after having conceived and organized several seminal exhibitions, such as the 1975 exhibition, Nelson/Eames/Girard/Propst: The Design Process at Herman Miller (Design Quarterly 98/99), bringing about further scrutiny and critical accolades for design as an art.

She continued to work at Walker Art Center in many capacities up until her retirement in 1990. In addition to curating exhibits on architecture and design, including the Walker's noted 1986 exhibition Frank Gehry, architect, Friedman was also instrumental in shaping the remodeling and interiors of the Walker.

Friedman was also interested in making architecture and design more accessible. "What interests me about movements in architecture and design is when something really has an impact on the way people live and the way they think." In addition to her role as Curator of Design, Friedman also wrote extensively and served as an editor for several exhibition publications. Her first job at the Walker Art Center in 1969 was as the editor of Design Quarterly, a publication started by the Walker (1954–1996; previous title: Everyday Art Quarterly, 1946–1953). The last issue she edited was no. 152 (1991).

In 2013, the Walker Art Center named their design fellowship the Mildred S. Friedman Design Fellowship, a program started under Friedman's leadership in the 1980, in Friedman's honor.

== Major exhibitions ==
Friedman curated or co-curated many large shows, from the 1970s up until the mid-2000s. In addition to Frank Gehry, architect, other notable shows include De Stijl, 1917–1931: Visions of Utopia and Tokyo: Form and Spirit. The last show she curated, Architecture Tomorrow, was a three-year long series that ran from 1988 to 1991, ending after she retired.

== Selected publications ==
- Friedman, Mildred S; Jaffé, Hans Ludwig Cohn (1988-01-01). De Stijl, 1917–1931: visions of utopia. Oxford: Phaidon. ISBN 978-0714824383. OCLC 762732287.
- Friedman, Mildred; Giovannini, Joseph; Heller, Steven; Walker Art Center (1989-01-01). Graphic design in America: a visual language history. Minneapolis; New York: Walker Art Center; Abrams. ISBN 978-0810910362. OCLC 471819751.
- Friedman, Mildred (2013-01-01). Frank Gehry: the houses. New York: Rizzoli. ISBN 9780847830602. OCLC 893456325.
- Rand, Paul; Friedman, Mildred S; Walker Art Center (1984-01-01). A Paul Rand miscellany. Minneapolis: Walker Art Center. OCLC 10508212.
