= Cabinet of Barack Obama =

Obama Cabinet
- Cabinet of the United States
- 2009–2017
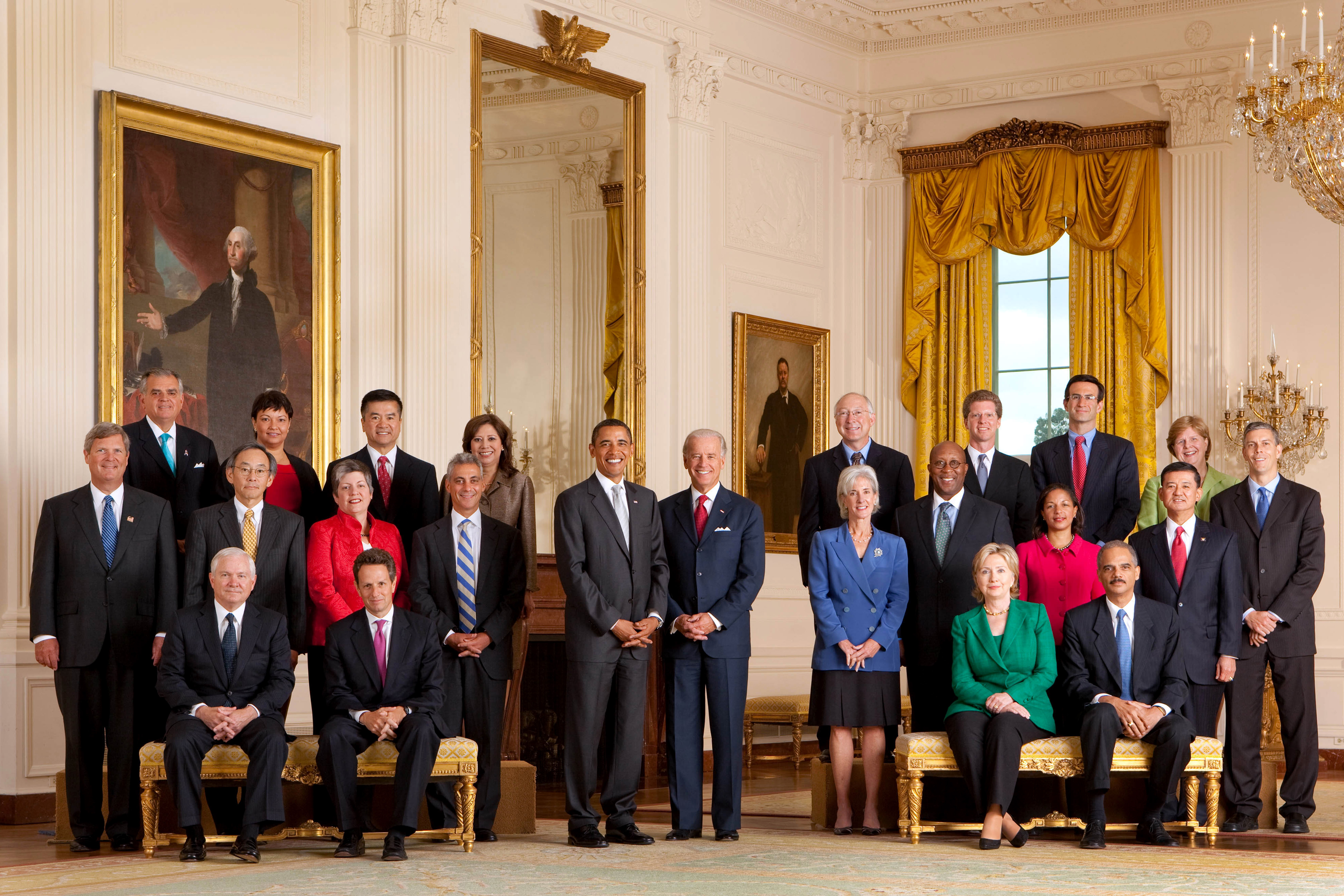
- First Cabinet of President Barack Obama in the White House East Room, 2009
- Date formed: January 20, 2009
- Date dissolved: January 20, 2017

People and organisations
- President: Barack Obama
- President's history: U.S. Senator from Illinois (2005–2008); Illinois State Senator (1997–2004)
- Vice President: Joe Biden
- Member party: Democratic Party
- Status in legislature: Majority government (2009–2011); Divided government (2011–2017)
- Opposition party: Republican Party

History
- Elections: 2008 presidential election 2012 presidential election
- Legislature terms: 111th Congress; 112th Congress; 113th Congress; 114th Congress; 115th Congress (17 days)
- Budgets: 2009 budget 2010 budget 2011 budget 2012 budget 2013 budget 2014 budget 2015 budget 2016 budget
- Advice and consent: United States Senate
- Predecessor: G.W. Bush Cabinet
- Successor: First Trump Cabinet

Barack Obama assumed office as the 44th president of the United States on January 20, 2009, and his term ended on January 20, 2017. The president has the authority to nominate members of his Cabinet to the United States Senate for confirmation under the Appointments Clause of the United States Constitution.

Before confirmation and during congressional hearings a high-level career member of an executive department heads this pre-confirmed cabinet on an acting basis. The Cabinet's creation was part of the transition of power following the 2008 presidential election.

This article documents the nomination and confirmation process for any successful or unsuccessful Cabinet nominees of the Obama administration. They are listed in order of creation of the Cabinet position (also used as the basis for the United States presidential line of succession).

== Cabinet ==
=== Cabinet officials on January 20, 2017 ===
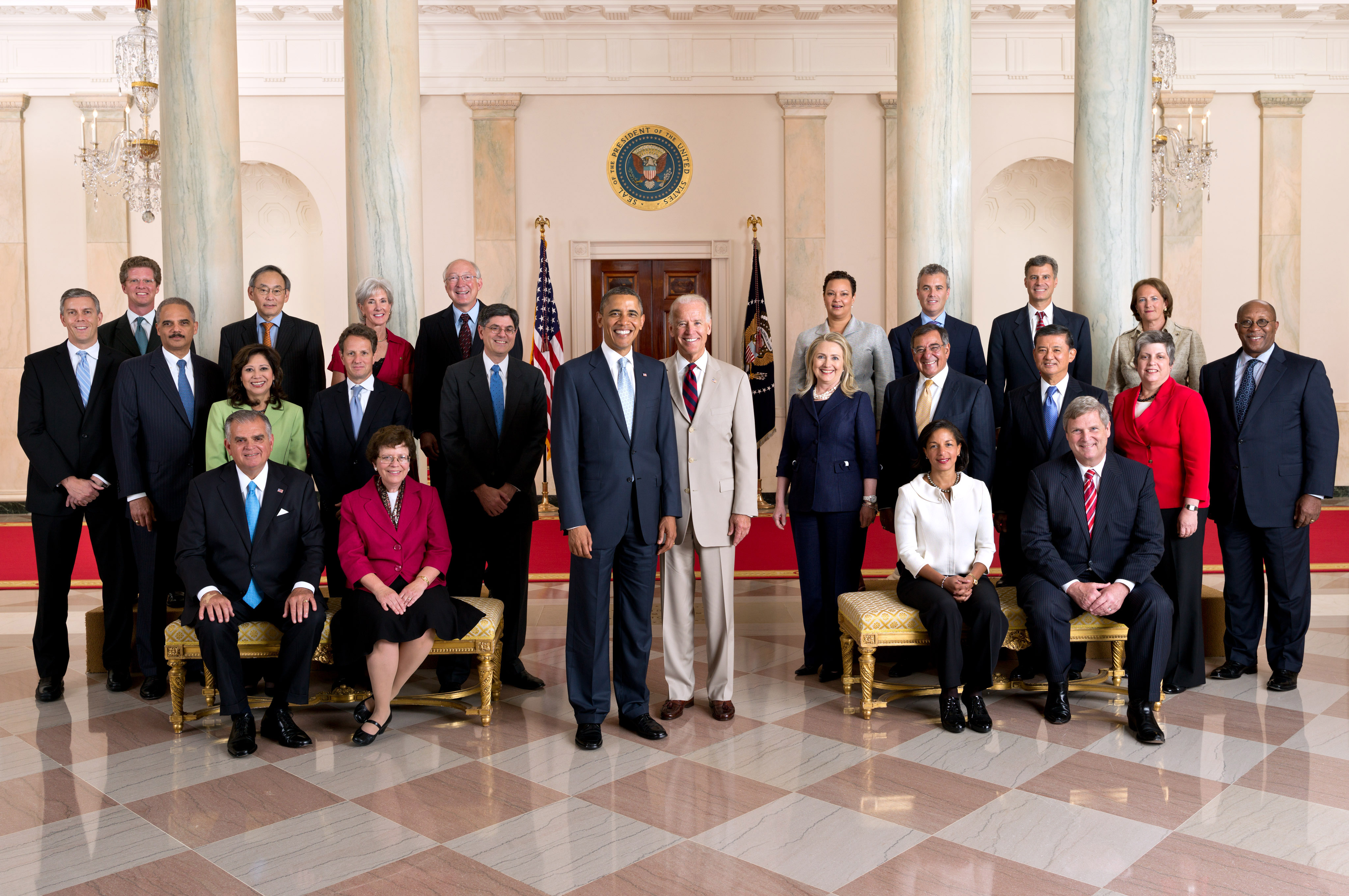

Obama cabinet
Office	Name	Term
President	Barack Obama	2009–2017
Vice President	Joe Biden	2009–2017
Secretary of State	Hillary Clinton	2009–2013
John Kerry	2013–2017
Secretary of the Treasury	Timothy Geithner	2009–2013
Jack Lew	2013–2017
Secretary of Defense	Robert Gates*	2006–2011
Leon Panetta	2011–2013
Chuck Hagel	2013–2015
Ash Carter	2015–2017
Attorney General	Eric Holder	2009–2015
Loretta Lynch	2015–2017
Secretary of the Interior	Ken Salazar	2009–2013
Sally Jewell	2013–2017
Secretary of Agriculture	Tom Vilsack	2009–2017
Secretary of Commerce	Gary Locke	2009–2011
John Bryson	2011–2012
Penny Pritzker	2013–2017
Secretary of Labor	Hilda Solis	2009–2013
Tom Perez	2013–2017
Secretary of Health and Human Services	Kathleen Sebelius	2009–2014
Sylvia Mathews Burwell	2014–2017
Secretary of Housing and Urban Development	Shaun Donovan	2009–2014
Julian Castro	2014–2017
Secretary of Transportation	Ray LaHood	2009–2013
Anthony Foxx	2013–2017
Secretary of Energy	Steven Chu	2009–2013
Ernest Moniz	2013–2017
Secretary of Education	Arne Duncan	2009–2016
John King Jr.	2016–2017
Secretary of Veterans Affairs	Eric Shinseki	2009–2014
Bob McDonald	2014–2017
Secretary of Homeland Security	Janet Napolitano	2009–2013
Jeh Johnson	2013–2017
Administrator of the Environmental Protection Agency	Lisa Jackson	2009–2013
Gina McCarthy	2013–2017
Director of the Office of Management and Budget	Peter Orszag	2009–2010
Jack Lew	2010–2012
Sylvia Mathews Burwell	2013–2014
Shaun Donovan	2014–2017
United States Trade Representative	Ron Kirk	2009–2013
Michael Froman	2013–2017
Ambassador to the United Nations	Susan Rice	2009–2013
Samantha Power	2013–2017
Chair of the Council of Economic Advisers	Christina Romer	2009–2010
Austan Goolsbee	2010–2011
Alan Krueger	2011–2013
Jason Furman	2013–2017
Administrator of the Small Business Administration	Karen Mills**	2009–2013
Maria Contreras-Sweet	2014–2017
White House Chief of Staff	Rahm Emanuel	2009–2010
William M. Daley	2011–2012
Jack Lew	2012–2013
Denis McDonough	2013–2017
- *Retained from previous administration **Elevated to cabinet-level in January 2012

All permanent members of the Cabinet of the United States as heads of executive departments require the advice and consent of the United States Senate following appointment by the president before taking office. The vice presidency is exceptional in that the position requires election to office pursuant to the United States Constitution. Although some are afforded cabinet-level rank, non-cabinet members within the Executive Office of the President, such as White House chief of staff, National Security Advisor, and White House press secretary, do not hold constitutionally created positions and most do not require Senate confirmation for appointment.

The following were the final members of President Barack Obama's Cabinet on January 20, 2017.

Cabinet of President Barack Obama
Elected to office – all other cabinet members serve at the pleasure of the president No Senate consent needed
Office Date announced / confirmed	Designee	Office Date announced / confirmed	Designee
Vice President; Announced August 22, 2008; Elected November 4, 2008; Assumed office January 20, 2009	U.S. Senator; Joe Biden of Delaware	Secretary of State; Announced December 21, 2012; Assumed office February 1, 2013	U.S. Senator; John Kerry of Massachusetts
Secretary of the Treasury; Announced January 10, 2013; Assumed office February 28, 2013	White House Chief of Staff; Jack Lew of New York	Secretary of Defense; Announced December 5, 2014; Assumed office February 17, 2015	Deputy Secretary of Defense; Ash Carter of Pennsylvania
Attorney General; Announced November 8, 2014; Assumed office April 27, 2015	United States Attorney; Loretta Lynch of New York	Secretary of the Interior; Announced February 6, 2013; Assumed office April 12, 2013	Chief Executive Officer of REI; Sally Jewell of Washington
Secretary of Agriculture; Assumed acting office January 13, 2017	Under Secretary of Agriculture for Farm and Foreign Agricultural Services; Michael Scuse of Delaware	Secretary of Commerce; Announced May 2, 2013; Assumed office June 26, 2013	Billionaire Businesswoman; Penny Pritzker of Illinois
Secretary of Labor; Announced March 18, 2013; Assumed office July 23, 2013	Assistant Attorney General; Tom Perez of Maryland	Secretary of Health and Human Services; Announced April 11, 2014; Assumed office June 9, 2014	Director of OMB; Sylvia Mathews Burwell of West Virginia
Secretary of Housing and Urban Development; Announced May 22, 2014; Assumed office July 28, 2014	Mayor of San Antonio; Julian Castro of Texas	Secretary of Transportation; Announced April 29, 2013; Assumed office July 2, 2013	Mayor of Charlotte; Anthony Foxx of North Carolina
Secretary of Energy; Announced March 4, 2013; Assumed office May 21, 2013	Former Under Secretary of Energy; Ernest Moniz of Massachusetts	Secretary of Education; Announced December 10, 2015; Assumed office January 1, 2016 (Note: King served as Acting Secretary of Education from January 1, 2016 to March 14, 2016.)	Acting Secretary of Education; John King Jr. of New York
Secretary of Veterans Affairs; Announced July 7, 2014; Assumed office July 30, 2014	Chief Executive Officer P&G; Bob McDonald of Ohio	Secretary of Homeland Security; Announced October 18, 2013; Assumed office December 23, 2013	Former General Counsel of D.O.D; Jeh Johnson of New York
=== Cabinet-level officials ===
Office Date announced / confirmed	Designee	Office Date announced / confirmed	Designee
White House Chief of Staff; Announced January 20, 2013; Assumed office January 20, 2013	Deputy National Security Advisor; Denis McDonough of Maryland	Administrator of the Environmental Protection Agency; Announced March 4, 2013; Assumed office July 18, 2013	Assistant Administrator for the EPA; Gina McCarthy of Connecticut
Director of the Office of Management and Budget; Announced May 22, 2014; Assumed office August 5, 2014	Housing Secretary; Shaun Donovan of New York	United States Trade Representative; Announced May 2, 2013; Assumed office June 21, 2013	Former Deputy National Security Advisor; Michael Froman of Washington D.C.
United States Ambassador to the United Nations; Announced June 5, 2013; Assumed office August 5, 2013	Special Assistant to the President; Samantha Power of Washington D.C.	Chair of the Council of Economic Advisors; Announced June 10, 2013; Assumed office August 2, 2013	Deputy Director of the National Economic Council; Jason Furman of Massachusetts
Administrator of the Small Business Administration; Announced January 15, 2014; Assumed office April 7, 2014	Former California Secretary of Business, Transportation and Housing Agency; Maria Contreras-Sweet of California		

=== Confirmation process ===
==== Confirmation votes ====
For comparison,

¶ Confirmations before June 2009

The below is a list of confirmations that were approved through the Senate from January to May 2009, by a recorded roll-call vote, rather than by a voice vote.

State	Senator	Party	Jan. 21 Hillary Clinton State 94–2	Jan. 26 Timothy Geithner Treasury 60–34	Feb. 2 Eric Holder Att'y-Gen. 75–21	Feb. 24 Hilda Solis Labor 80–17	March 18 Ron Kirk Trade 92–5	April 28 Kathleen Sebelius Health 65–31	May 7 Gil Kerlikowske Drug Policy 91-1
Hawaii	Daniel Akaka	D	Yea	Yea	Yea	Yea	Yea	Yea	Yea
Tennessee	Lamar Alexander	R	Yea	Nay	Yea	Yea	Yea	Nay	Yea
Wyoming	John Barrasso	R	Yea	Nay	Nay	Yea	Yea	Nay	Yea
Montana	Max Baucus	D	Yea	Yea	Yea	Yea	Yea	Yea	Yea
Indiana	Evan Bayh	D	Yea	Yea	Yea	Yea	Yea	Yea	Yea
Alaska	Mark Begich	D	Yea	Yea	Not voting	Yea	Yea	Yea	Yea
Colorado	Michael Bennet	D	Yea	Yea	Yea	Yea	Yea	Yea	Yea
Utah	Robert Bennett	R	Yea	Nay	Yea	Yea	Yea	Nay	Yea
New Mexico	Jeff Bingaman	D	Yea	Yea	Yea	Yea	Yea	Yea	Yea
Missouri	Kit Bond	R	Yea	Not voting	Yea	Nay	Nay	Yea	Not voting
California	Barbara Boxer	D	Yea	Yea	Yea	Yea	Yea	Yea	Yea
Ohio	Sherrod Brown	D	Yea	Not voting	Yea	Yea	Yea	Yea	Yea
Kansas	Sam Brownback	R	Yea	Nay	Nay	Yea	Yea	Yea	Yea
Kentucky	Jim Bunning	R	Yea	Nay	Nay	Nay	Nay	Nay	Yea
North Carolina	Richard Burr	R	Yea	Nay	Nay	Nay	Yea	Nay	Yea
Illinois	Roland Burris	D	Yea	Yea	Yea	Yea	Yea	Yea	Yea
West Virginia	Robert Byrd	D	Yea	Nay	Yea	Yea	Nay	Yea	Yea
Washington	Maria Cantwell	D	Yea	Yea	Yea	Yea	Yea	Yea	Yea
Maryland	Ben Cardin	D	Yea	Yea	Yea	Yea	Yea	Yea	Yea
Delaware	Tom Carper	D	Yea	Yea	Yea	Yea	Yea	Yea	Yea
Pennsylvania	Bob Casey	D	Yea	Yea	Yea	Yea	Yea	Yea	Yea
Georgia	Saxby Chambliss	R	Not voting	Nay	Yea	Yea	Yea	Nay	Yea
Oklahoma	Tom Coburn	R	Yea	Nay	Nay	Nay	Yea	Nay	Nay
Mississippi	Thad Cochran	R	Yea	Nay	Nay	Yea	Yea	Nay	Yea
Maine	Susan Collins	R	Yea	Nay	Yea	Yea	Yea	Yea	Yea
North Dakota	Kent Conrad	D	Yea	Yea	Yea	Yea	Yea	Yea	Yea
Tennessee	Bob Corker	R	Yea	Yea	Yea	Yea	Yea	Nay	Yea
Texas	John Cornyn	R	Yea	Yea	Nay	Nay	Yea	Nay	Yea
Idaho	Mike Crapo	R	Yea	Yea	Nay	Nay	Yea	Nay	Yea
South Carolina	Jim DeMint	R	Nay	Nay	Nay	Nay	Yea	Nay	Yea
Connecticut	Chris Dodd	D	Yea	Yea	Yea	Yea	Yea	Yea	Yea
North Dakota	Byron Dorgan	D	Yea	Yea	Yea	Yea	Yea	Yea	Yea
Illinois	Dick Durbin	D	Yea	Yea	Yea	Yea	Not voting	Yea	Yea
Nevada	John Ensign	R	Yea	Yea	Nay	Nay	Yea	Nay	Yea
Wyoming	Mike Enzi	R	Yea	Nay	Nay	Yea	Yea	Nay	Yea
Wisconsin	Russ Feingold	D	Yea	Nay	Yea	Yea	Yea	Yea	Yea
California	Dianne Feinstein	D	Yea	Yea	Yea	Yea	Yea	Yea	Yea
Minnesota	Al Franken	D	—	—	—	—	—	—	—
New York	Kirsten Gillibrand	D	—	—	Yea	Yea	Yea	Yea	Yea
South Carolina	Lindsey Graham	R	Yea	Yea	Yea	Yea	Yea	Nay	Yea
Iowa	Chuck Grassley	R	Yea	Nay	Yea	Yea	Yea	Nay	Yea
New Hampshire	Judd Gregg	R	Yea	Yea	Yea	Yea	Yea	Yea	Yea
North Carolina	Kay Hagan	D	Yea	Yea	Yea	Yea	Yea	Yea	Yea
Iowa	Tom Harkin	D	Yea	Nay	Yea	Not voting	Yea	Yea	Yea
Utah	Orrin Hatch	R	Yea	Yea	Yea	Yea	Yea	Nay	Yea
Texas	Kay Bailey Hutchison	R	Yea	Nay	Nay	Yea	Yea	Nay	Yea
Oklahoma	Jim Inhofe	R	Yea	Nay	Nay	Nay	Yea	Nay	Yea
Hawaii	Daniel Inouye	D	Yea	Yea	Yea	Yea	Yea	Yea	Yea
Georgia	Johnny Isakson	R	Yea	Nay	Yea	Yea	Nay	Nay	Yea
Nebraska	Mike Johanns	R	Yea	Nay	Nay	Yea	Yea	Nay	Yea
South Dakota	Tim Johnson	D	Yea	Yea	Yea	Yea	Yea	Yea	Not voting
Delaware	Ted Kaufman	D	Yea	Yea	Yea	Yea	Yea	Yea	Yea
Massachusetts	Ted Kennedy	D	Not voting	Not voting	Not voting	Not voting	Not voting	Not voting	Not voting
Massachusetts	John Kerry	D	Yea	Yea	Yea	Yea	Yea	Yea	Yea
Minnesota	Amy Klobuchar	D	Yea	Yea	Yea	Yea	Yea	Yea	Yea
Wisconsin	Herb Kohl	D	Yea	Yea	Yea	Yea	Yea	Yea	Yea
Arizona	Jon Kyl	R	Yea	Nay	Yea	Nay	Yea	Nay	Yea
Louisiana	Mary Landrieu	D	Yea	Yea	Yea	Yea	Yea	Yea	Yea
New Jersey	Frank Lautenberg	D	Yea	Yea	Yea	Yea	Yea	Yea	Not voting
Vermont	Patrick Leahy	D	Yea	Yea	Yea	Yea	Yea	Yea	Yea
Michigan	Carl Levin	D	Yea	Yea	Yea	Yea	Yea	Yea	Yea
Connecticut	Joe Lieberman	Ind. D	Yea	Yea	Yea	Yea	Yea	Yea	Yea
Arkansas	Blanche Lincoln	D	Yea	Yea	Yea	Yea	Yea	Yea	Yea
Indiana	Richard Lugar	R	Yea	Nay	Yea	Yea	Yea	Yea	Yea
Florida	Mel Martinez	R	Yea	Nay	Not voting	Yea	Yea	Nay	Yea
Arizona	John McCain	R	Yea	Nay	Yea	Yea	Yea	Nay	Yea
Missouri	Claire McCaskill	D	Yea	Yea	Yea	Yea	Yea	Yea	Yea
Kentucky	Mitch McConnell	R	Yea	Nay	Nay	Yea	Yea	Nay	Yea
New Jersey	Bob Menendez	D	Yea	Yea	Yea	Yea	Yea	Yea	Not voting
Oregon	Jeff Merkley	D	Yea	Yea	Yea	Yea	Yea	Yea	Yea
Maryland	Barbara Mikulski	D	Yea	Yea	Yea	Yea	Yea	Yea	Yea
Alaska	Lisa Murkowski	R	Yea	Nay	Yea	Yea	Yea	Nay	Yea
Washington	Patty Murray	D	Yea	Yea	Yea	Yea	Yea	Yea	Yea
Florida	Bill Nelson	D	Yea	Yea	Yea	Yea	Yea	Yea	Yea
Nebraska	Ben Nelson	D	Yea	Yea	Yea	Yea	Yea	Yea	Yea
Arkansas	Mark Pryor	D	Yea	Yea	Yea	Yea	Yea	Yea	Yea
Rhode Island	Jack Reed	D	Yea	Yea	Yea	Yea	Yea	Yea	Yea
Nevada	Harry Reid	D	Yea	Yea	Yea	Yea	Yea	Yea	Yea
Idaho	Jim Risch	R	Yea	Nay	Nay	Nay	Yea	Nay	Yea
Kansas	Pat Roberts	R	Yea	Nay	Nay	Nay	Yea	Yea	Yea
West Virginia	Jay Rockefeller	D	Yea	Yea	Yea	Yea	Yea	Not voting	Not voting
Vermont	Bernie Sanders	Ind.	Yea	Nay	Yea	Yea	Nay	Yea	Yea
New York	Chuck Schumer	D	Yea	Yea	Yea	Yea	Yea	Yea	Yea
Alabama	Jeff Sessions	R	Yea	Nay	Yea	Nay	Yea	Not voting	Yea
New Hampshire	Jeanne Shaheen	D	Yea	Yea	Yea	Yea	Yea	Yea	Yea
Alabama	Richard Shelby	R	Yea	Yea	Nay	Nay	Yea	Nay	Yea
Maine	Olympia Snowe	R	Yea	Yea	Yea	Yea	Yea	Yea	Yea
Pennsylvania	Arlen Specter	R→D	Yea	Nay	Yea	Yea	Yea	Yea	Yea
Michigan	Debbie Stabenow	D	Yea	Yea	Yea	Yea	Yea	Yea	Yea
Montana	Jon Tester	D	Yea	Yea	Yea	Yea	Yea	Yea	Yea
South Dakota	John Thune	R	Yea	Nay	Nay	Nay	Yea	Nay	Yea
Colorado	Mark Udall	D	Yea	Yea	Yea	Yea	Yea	Yea	Yea
New Mexico	Tom Udall	D	Yea	Yea	Yea	Yea	Yea	Yea	Yea
Louisiana	David Vitter	R	Nay	Nay	Nay	Nay	Yea	Nay	Not voting
Ohio	George Voinovich	R	Yea	Yea	Yea	Yea	Yea	Yea	Yea
Virginia	Mark Warner	D	Yea	Yea	Yea	Yea	Yea	Yea	Yea
Virginia	Jim Webb	D	Yea	Yea	Yea	Yea	Yea	Yea	Yea
Rhode Island	Sheldon Whitehouse	D	Yea	Yea	Yea	Yea	Yea	Yea	Yea
Mississippi	Roger Wicker	R	Yea	Nay	Nay	Nay	Yea	Nay	Yea
Oregon	Ron Wyden	D	Yea	Not voting	Yea	Yea	Yea	Yea	Yea
	vote by party	D R Ind. —	54–0; 38–2; 2–0; Clinton	49–3; 10–30; 1–1; Geithner	54–0; 19–21; 2–0; Holder	54–0; 24–17; 2–0; Solis	53–1; 38–3; 1–1; Kirk	54–0; 9–31; 2–0; Sebelius	52–0; 37–1; 2–0; Kerlikowske
Notes and Key : All dates are in 2009. For later votes, see the table below. * Att'y-Gen. = Attorney-General of the United States; * Trade = U.S. Trade Representative; * Health = Secretary of Health and Human Services; * Drug Policy = Director of the Office of National Drug Control Policy — before confirmation, this post was removed from Cabinet-level status; D = Democratic; R = Republican; Ind. = independent; Ind. D = independent Democratic; R→D = moved from Republican to Democratic caucus on April 29–30, 2009; — = seat vacant at the time of this vote. Sources: United States Senate; The Washington Post

¶ Confirmations after June 2009 (August 6, 2009 – December 8, 2011)

State	Senator	Party	Jan. 28, 2010 Ben S. Bernanke Chairman of Fed 70–30	June 30, 2011 David Petraeus CIA (6 NV) 94–0	Oct. 20, 2011 John E. Bryson Sec. of Commerce 74–26	Dec. 8, 2011 Richard Cordray CFPB (failed) 53–45
Hawaii	Daniel Akaka	D	Yea	Yea	Yea	Yea
Tennessee	Lamar Alexander	R	Yea	Yea	Yea	Nay
New Hampshire	Kelly Ayotte	R	—	Yea	Yea	Nay
Wyoming	John Barrasso	R	Yea	Yea	Nay	Nay
Montana	Max Baucus	D	Yea	Yea	Yea	Yea
Indiana	Evan Bayh	D	Yea	—	—	—
Alaska	Mark Begich	D	Nay	Yea	Yea	Yea
Colorado	Michael Bennet	D	Yea	Yea	Yea	Yea
Utah	Robert Bennett	R	Yea	—	—	—
New Mexico	Jeff Bingaman	D	Yea	Yea	Yea	Yea
Connecticut	Richard Blumenthal	D	—	Yea	Yea	Yea
Missouri	Roy Blunt	R	—	Yea	Nay	Nay
Missouri	Kit Bond	R	Yea	—	—	—
Arkansas	John Boozman	R	—	Yea	Nay	Nay
California	Barbara Boxer	D	Nay	Not Voting	Yea	Yea
Massachusetts	Scott Brown	R	—	Yea	Yea	Yea
Ohio	Sherrod Brown	D	Yea	Yea	Yea	Yea
Kansas	Sam Brownback	R	Nay	—	—	—
Kentucky	Jim Bunning	R	Nay	—	—	—
North Carolina	Richard Burr	R	Yea	Not Voting	Nay	Nay
Illinois	Roland Burris	D	Yea	—	—	—
West Virginia	Robert Byrd	D	Yea	—	—	—
Washington	Maria Cantwell	D	Nay	Yea	Yea	Yea
Maryland	Ben Cardin	D	Yea	Yea	Yea	Yea
Delaware	Tom Carper	D	Yea	Yea	Yea	Yea
Pennsylvania	Bob Casey	D	Yea	Yea	Yea	Yea
Georgia	Saxby Chambliss	R	Yea	Yea	Yea	Nay
Indiana	Dan Coats	R	—	Yea	Yea	Nay
Oklahoma	Tom Coburn	R	Yea	Yea	Nay	Nay
Mississippi	Thad Cochran	R	Yea	Yea	Yea	Nay
Maine	Susan Collins	R	Yea	Yea	Yea	Nay
North Dakota	Kent Conrad	D	Yea	Yea	Yea	Yea
Delaware	Chris Coons	D	—	Yea	Yea	Yea
Tennessee	Bob Corker	R	Yea	Yea	Yea	Nay
Texas	John Cornyn	R	Nay	Yea	Nay	Nay
Idaho	Mike Crapo	R	Nay	Yea	Nay	Nay
South Carolina	Jim DeMint	R	Nay	Yea	Nay	Nay
Connecticut	Chris Dodd	D	Yea	—	—	—
North Dakota	Byron Dorgan	D	Nay	—	—	—
Illinois	Dick Durbin	D	Yea	Yea	Yea	Yea
Nevada	John Ensign	R	Nay	—	—	—
Wyoming	Mike Enzi	R	Yea	Yea	Nay	Nay
Wisconsin	Russ Feingold	D	Nay	—	—	—
California	Dianne Feinstein	D	Yea	Yea	Yea	Yea
Minnesota	Al Franken	D	Nay	Yea	Yea	Yea
New York	Kirsten Gillibrand	D	Yea	Yea	Yea	Yea
West Virginia	Carte Goodwin	D	—	—	—	—
South Carolina	Lindsey Graham	R	Yea	Yea	Yea	Nay
Iowa	Chuck Grassley	R	Nay	Yea	Nay	Nay
New Hampshire	Judd Gregg	R	Yea	—	—	—
North Carolina	Kay Hagan	D	Yea	Yea	Yea	Yea
Iowa	Tom Harkin	D	Nay	Yea	Yea	Yea
Utah	Orrin Hatch	R	Yea	Yea	Nay	Nay
Nevada	Dean Heller	R	—	Yea	Nay	Nay
North Dakota	John Hoeven	R	—	Yea	Nay	Nay
Texas	Kay Bailey Hutchison	R	Nay	Yea	Yea	Nay
Oklahoma	Jim Inhofe	R	Nay	Not Voting	Nay	Nay
Hawaii	Daniel Inouye	D	Yea	Yea	Yea	Yea
Georgia	Johnny Isakson	R	Yea	Yea	Yea	Nay
Nebraska	Mike Johanns	R	Yea	Yea	Yea	Nay
South Dakota	Tim Johnson	D	Yea	Yea	Yea	Yea
Wisconsin	Ron Johnson	R	—	Yea	Nay	Nay
Delaware	Ted Kaufman	D	Nay	—	—	—
Massachusetts	Ted Kennedy	D	—	—	—	—
Massachusetts	John Kerry	D	Yea	Yea	Yea	Not Voting
Massachusetts	Paul Kirk	D	Yea	—	—	—
Illinois	Mark Kirk	R	—	Yea	Yea	Nay
Minnesota	Amy Klobuchar	D	Yea	Yea	Yea	Yea
Wisconsin	Herb Kohl	D	Yea	Yea	Yea	Yea
Arizona	Jon Kyl	R	Yea	Yea	Nay	Nay
Louisiana	Mary Landrieu	D	Yea	Yea	Yea	Yea
New Jersey	Frank Lautenberg	D	Yea	Yea	Yea	Yea
Vermont	Patrick Leahy	D	Yea	Not Voting	Yea	Yea
Utah	Mike Lee	R	—	Yea	Nay	Nay
Florida	George LeMieux	R	Nay	—	—	—
Michigan	Carl Levin	D	Yea	Yea	Yea	Yea
Connecticut	Joe Lieberman	Ind. D	Yea	Yea	Yea	Yea
Arkansas	Blanche Lincoln	D	Yea	—	—	—
Indiana	Richard Lugar	R	Yea	Yea	Yea	Nay
Florida	Mel Martinez	R	—	—	—	—
Arizona	John McCain	R	Nay	Yea	Yea	Nay
Missouri	Claire McCaskill	D	Yea	Yea	Yea	Yea
Kentucky	Mitch McConnell	R	Yea	Yea	Nay	Nay
New Jersey	Bob Menendez	D	Yea	Yea	Yea	Yea
Oregon	Jeff Merkley	D	Nay	Yea	Yea	Yea
Maryland	Barbara Mikulski	D	Yea	Yea	Yea	Yea
Kansas	Jerry Moran	R	—	Not Voting	Yea	Nay
Alaska	Lisa Murkowski	R	Yea	Yea	Yea	Nay
Washington	Patty Murray	D	Yea	Yea	Yea	Yea
Florida	Bill Nelson	D	Yea	Yea	Yea	Yea
Nebraska	Ben Nelson	D	Yea	Yea	Yea	Yea
Kentucky	Rand Paul	R	—	Yea	Nay	Nay
Ohio	Rob Portman	R	—	Yea	Yea	Nay
Arkansas	Mark Pryor	D	Yea	Yea	Yea	Yea
Rhode Island	Jack Reed	D	Yea	Yea	Yea	Yea
Nevada	Harry Reid	D	Yea	Yea	Yea	Yea
Idaho	Jim Risch	R	Nay	Yea	Nay	Nay
Kansas	Pat Roberts	R	Nay	Yea	Nay	Nay
West Virginia	Jay Rockefeller	D	Yea	Yea	Yea	Yea
Florida	Marco Rubio	R	—	Yea	Nay	Nay
Vermont	Bernie Sanders	Ind.	Nay	Yea	Yea	Yea
New York	Chuck Schumer	D	Yea	Yea	Yea	Yea
Alabama	Jeff Sessions	R	Nay	Yea	Nay	Nay
New Hampshire	Jeanne Shaheen	D	Yea	Yea	Yea	Yea
Alabama	Richard Shelby	R	Nay	Yea	Nay	Nay
Maine	Olympia Snowe	R	Yea	Yea	Yea	Present
Pennsylvania	Arlen Specter	D	Nay	—	—	—
Michigan	Debbie Stabenow	D	Yea	Yea	Yea	Yea
Montana	Jon Tester	D	Yea	Yea	Yea	Yea
South Dakota	John Thune	R	Nay	Yea	Yea	Nay
Pennsylvania	Pat Toomey	R	—	Yea	Yea	Nay
Colorado	Mark Udall	D	Yea	Yea	Yea	Yea
New Mexico	Tom Udall	D	Yea	Not Voting	Yea	Yea
Louisiana	David Vitter	R	Nay	Yea	Nay	Nay
Ohio	George Voinovich	R	Yea	—	—	—
Virginia	Mark Warner	D	Yea	Yea	Yea	Yea
Virginia	Jim Webb	D	Yea	Yea	Yea	Yea
Rhode Island	Sheldon Whitehouse	D	Nay	Yea	Yea	Yea
Mississippi	Roger Wicker	R	Nay	Yea	Nay	Nay
Oregon	Ron Wyden	D	Yea	Yea	Yea	Yea
	session & roll call		111th (2nd); 16	112th (1st); 104	112th (1st); 176	112th (1st); 223
	vote by party	D R Ind.	47–11; 22–18; 1–1; Bernanke	48–0 (3 NV); 44–0 (3 NV); 2–0; Petraeus	51–0; 21–26; 2–0; Bryson	50–0 (1 NV); 1–45 (1 Pres); 2–0; Cordray
Notes: (failed) = Roll call was for cloture of debate on Cordray's nomination (ending filibusters), requiring a three-fifths vote; Chairman of Fed = Chairman of the Federal Reserve Board of Governors; CIA = Director of the Central Intelligence Agency; CFPB = Director of the Consumer Financial Protection Bureau; D = Democratic; R = Republican; Ind. = independent; Ind. D = independent Democratic; — = not a Senator during this vote; NV = Not Voting; Pres = Present; Sources: United States Senate: 2009; 2010; 2011; The Washington Post: 2009; 2010; 2011

== Elected officials ==
=== President ===
Barack Obama defeated United States senator and Republican nominee, John McCain (R-AZ), in the 2008 presidential election, receiving 365 electoral votes compared to McCain's 173 electoral votes in the election. The formal certification of the results took place on January 8, 2009. He assumed office on January 20, 2009.

He was the first African American president of the United States as well as the first multiracial and non-white to hold the highest office.

President of the United States
Portrait	Name	Date of birth	State	Background	Reference
	Barack Obama	August 4, 1961	Illinois	U.S. Senator from Illinois (2005–2008); Member of the Illinois Senate from the 13th district; Democratic presidential candidate (2008)	

=== Vice President ===
The vice president is the only cabinet member to be elected to the position who does not require Senate confirmation, and the vice president does not serve at the pleasure of the president. There were dozens of potential running mates for Obama who received media speculation. Obama's eventual pick of Senator Joe Biden (D-DE) was officially announced on August 21, 2008, and confirmed by acclamation via parliamentary procedure amongst delegates to the 2008 Democratic National Convention on August 27, 2008.

United States senator Joe Biden (D-DE) was elected Vice President of the United States, receiving 365 electoral votes, compared to the governor of Alaska, Sarah Palin, who received 173 electoral votes in the election. The formal certification of the results took place on January 8, 2009. He assumed office on January 20, 2009.

Vice President of the United States
Portrait	Name	Date of birth	State	Background	Reference
	Joe Biden	November 20, 1942	Delaware	U.S. Senator from Delaware (1973–2009); Chair of the International Narcotics Control Caucus (2007–2009); Chair of the Senate Foreign Relations Committee (2001 (Note: Biden held the chairmanship from January 3 to January 20, then was succeeded by Jesse Helms until June 6, and thereafter held the position until 2003)–2003, 2007–2009); Democratic presidential candidate (1988, 2008); Chair of the Senate Judiciary Committee (1987–1995); New Castle County Councilman, 4th district (1971–1973)	

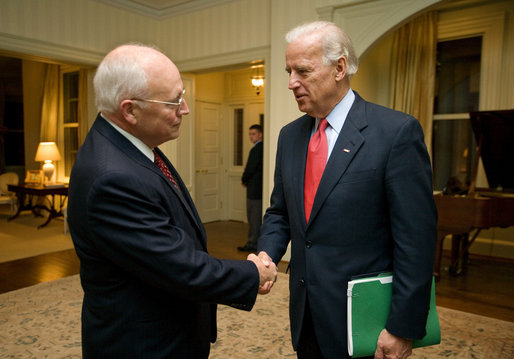
Vice President-elect Joe Biden with Vice President Dick Cheney at Number One Observatory Circle, November 13, 2008

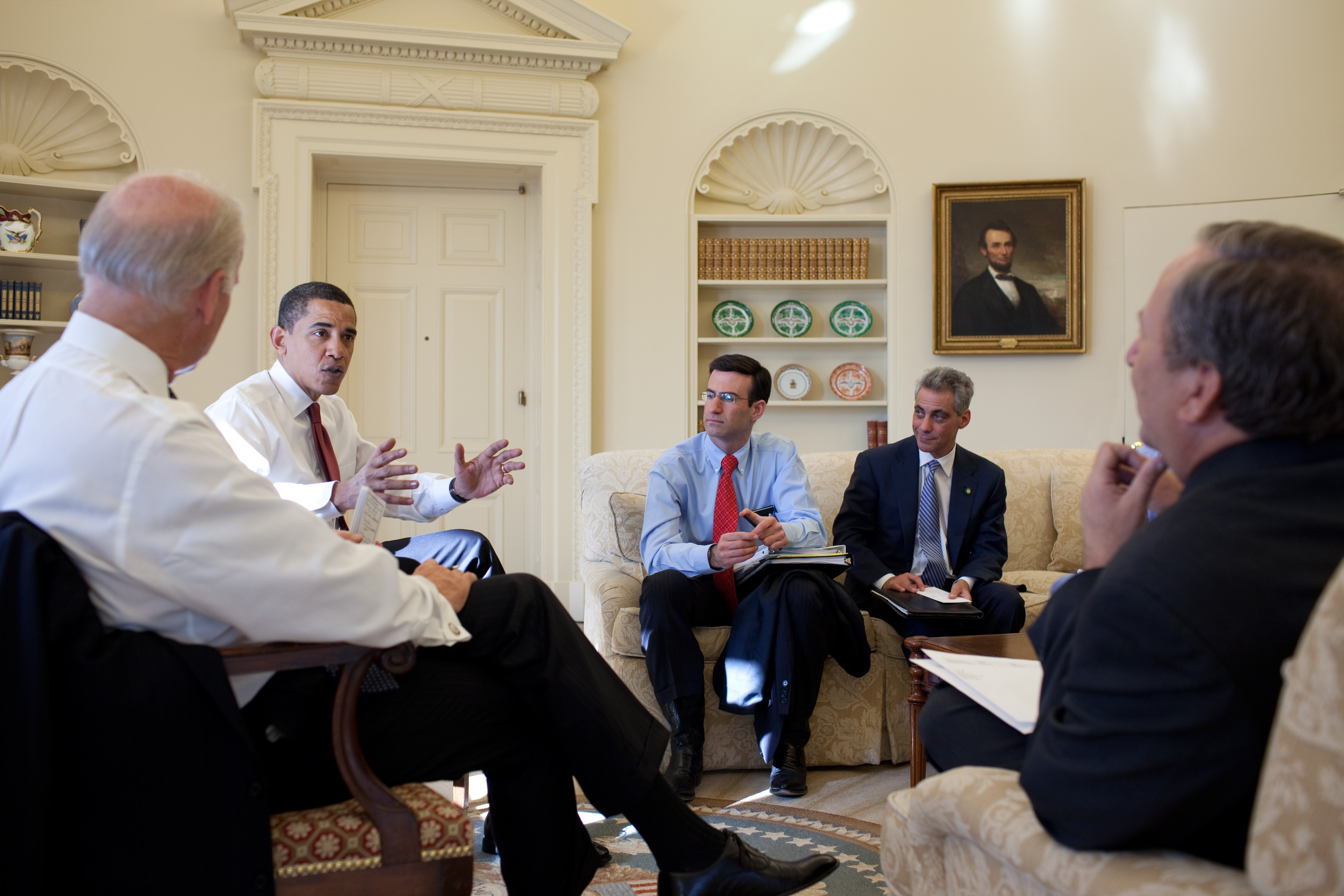
From left: Vice President Joe Biden, President Obama, Budget Director Peter Orszag and Chief of Staff Rahm Emanuel in the Oval Office, January 2009

Since shortly following Biden's withdrawal from the presidential race, Obama had been privately telling Biden that he was interested in finding an important place for him in a possible Obama administration. In a June 22, 2008, interview on NBC's Meet the Press, Biden confirmed that, although he was not actively seeking a spot on the ticket, he would accept the vice presidential nomination if offered. In early August, Obama and Biden met in secret to discuss a possible vice-presidential relationship. On August 22, 2008, Barack Obama announced that Biden would be his running mate. The New York Times reported that the strategy behind the choice reflected a desire to fill out the ticket with someone who has foreign policy and national security experience—and not to help the ticket win a swing state or to emphasize Obama's "change" message. Other observers pointed out Biden's appeal to middle-class and blue-collar voters, as well as his willingness to aggressively challenge Republican nominee John McCain in a way that Obama seemed uncomfortable doing at times. In accepting Obama's offer, Biden ruled out to him the possibility of running for president again in 2016.

On November 4, 2008, Obama was elected president and Biden vice president of the United States. The Obama-Biden ticket won 365 electoral college votes to McCain-Palin's 173, and had a 53–46 percent edge in the nationwide popular vote. Biden became the 47th Vice President of the United States on January 20, 2009, when he was inaugurated alongside President Barack Obama. He succeeded Dick Cheney. Biden is the first United States Vice President from Delaware and the first Roman Catholic to attain that office. Biden's oath of office was administered by Supreme Court Justice John Paul Stevens. As the presidential transition of Barack Obama began, Biden said he was in daily meetings with Obama and that McCain was still his friend. The U.S. Secret Service codename given to Biden is "Celtic", referencing his Irish roots.

Biden chose veteran Democratic lawyer and aide Ron Klain to be his vice-presidential chief of staff, and Time Washington bureau chief Jay Carney to be his director of communications. Biden intended to eliminate some of the explicit roles assumed by the vice presidency of Cheney. But otherwise, Biden said he would not model his vice presidency on any of the ones before him, but instead would seek to provide advice and counsel on every critical decision Obama would make. Biden said he had been closely involved in all the cabinet appointments that were made during the transition. Biden was also named to head the new White House Task Force on Working Families, an initiative aimed at improving the economic well-being of the middle class.

== Nominated candidates for Cabinet positions ==
The following cabinet positions are listed in order of their creation (also used as the basis for the United States presidential line of succession).

=== Secretary of State ===
The Secretary of State designate is reviewed and presented to the full Senate by the Senate Foreign Relations Committee.

==== Hillary Clinton (2009–2013) ====
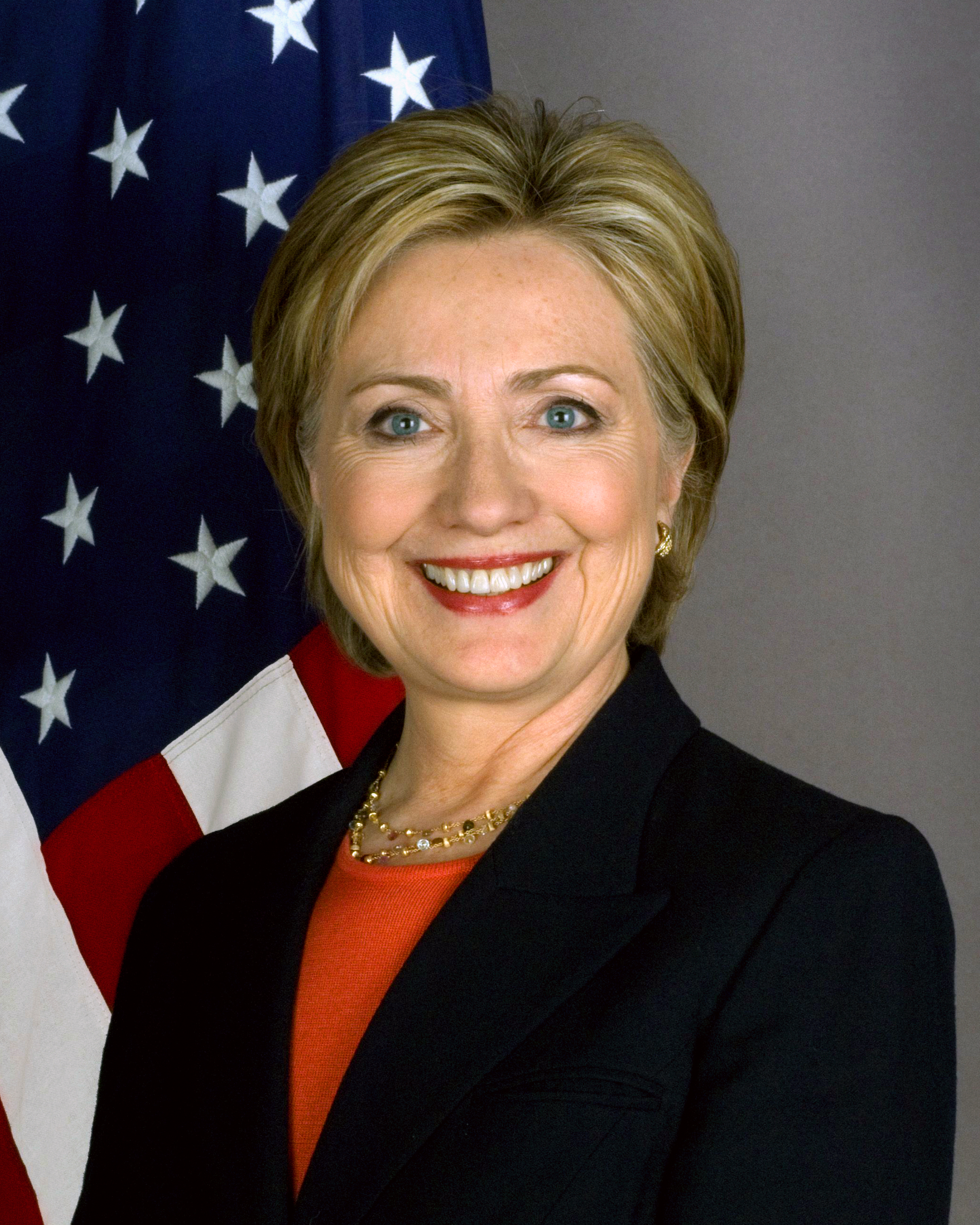
Hillary Clinton

Hillary Clinton assumed the office of Secretary of State on January 21, 2009. In mid-November 2008, President-elect Obama and Clinton discussed the possibility of her serving as U.S. Secretary of State in his administration, along with rumored nominees such as Bill Richardson, John Kerry, Sam Nunn and Chuck Hagel and on November 21, reports indicated that she had accepted the position. Clinton was floated in emails by Obama transition officials as a possible secretary of health and human services. On December 1, President-elect Obama formally announced that Clinton would be his nominee for Secretary of State. Clinton said she was reluctant to leave the Senate, but that the new position represented a "difficult and exciting adventure". The appointment required a Saxbe fix, as Clinton was then a member of the United States Senate. As part of the nomination, Clinton's husband, former president Bill Clinton, agreed to accept a number of conditions and restrictions regarding his ongoing activities and fundraising efforts for the Clinton Presidential Center and Clinton Global Initiative.

Confirmation hearings before the Senate Foreign Relations Committee began on January 13, 2009, a week before the Obama inauguration; two days later, the committee voted 16–1 to approve Clinton. By this time, Clinton's public approval rating had reached 65 percent, the highest point since the Clinton–Lewinsky scandal. On January 21, 2009, Clinton was confirmed in the full Senate by a roll call vote of 94–2. Clinton took the oath of office of Secretary of State and resigned from the Senate the same day.

Senate Foreign Relations Committee Chairman John Kerry stated that he expected Clinton to face some tough questions, but thought she was going to do a good job at (being Secretary of State). Christopher Hitchens of Vanity Fair called her nomination a ludicrous embarrassment on the edition of November 18, 2008, of Hardball due to the Clintons' overseas connections, her actions during the 2008 Democratic Presidential Primary. Senator John Cornyn (R-Texas) voted against a unanimous voice approval, citing ethical concerns. He sought not to block the nomination through a filibuster, but to voice his opposition to her policies. Senator David Vitter (R-Louisiana) also voted against Clinton in Committee citing her husband's foreign donations for his non-profit entities.

==== John Kerry (2013–2017) ====
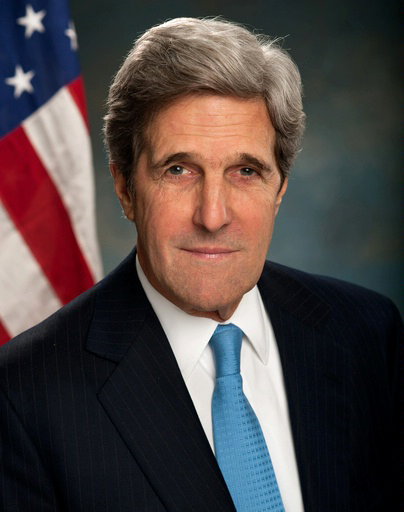
John Kerry

Hillary Clinton had announced she would not stay on in a second Obama term. Obama nominated Senator John Kerry of Massachusetts as his Secretary of State. On January 29, 2013, John Kerry was confirmed by the Senate in a 94–3 vote to be Secretary of State. John Kerry took office on February 1, 2013.

=== Secretary of the Treasury ===
The Secretary of the Treasury is reviewed by the Senate Finance Committee.

==== Tim Geithner (2009–2013) ====
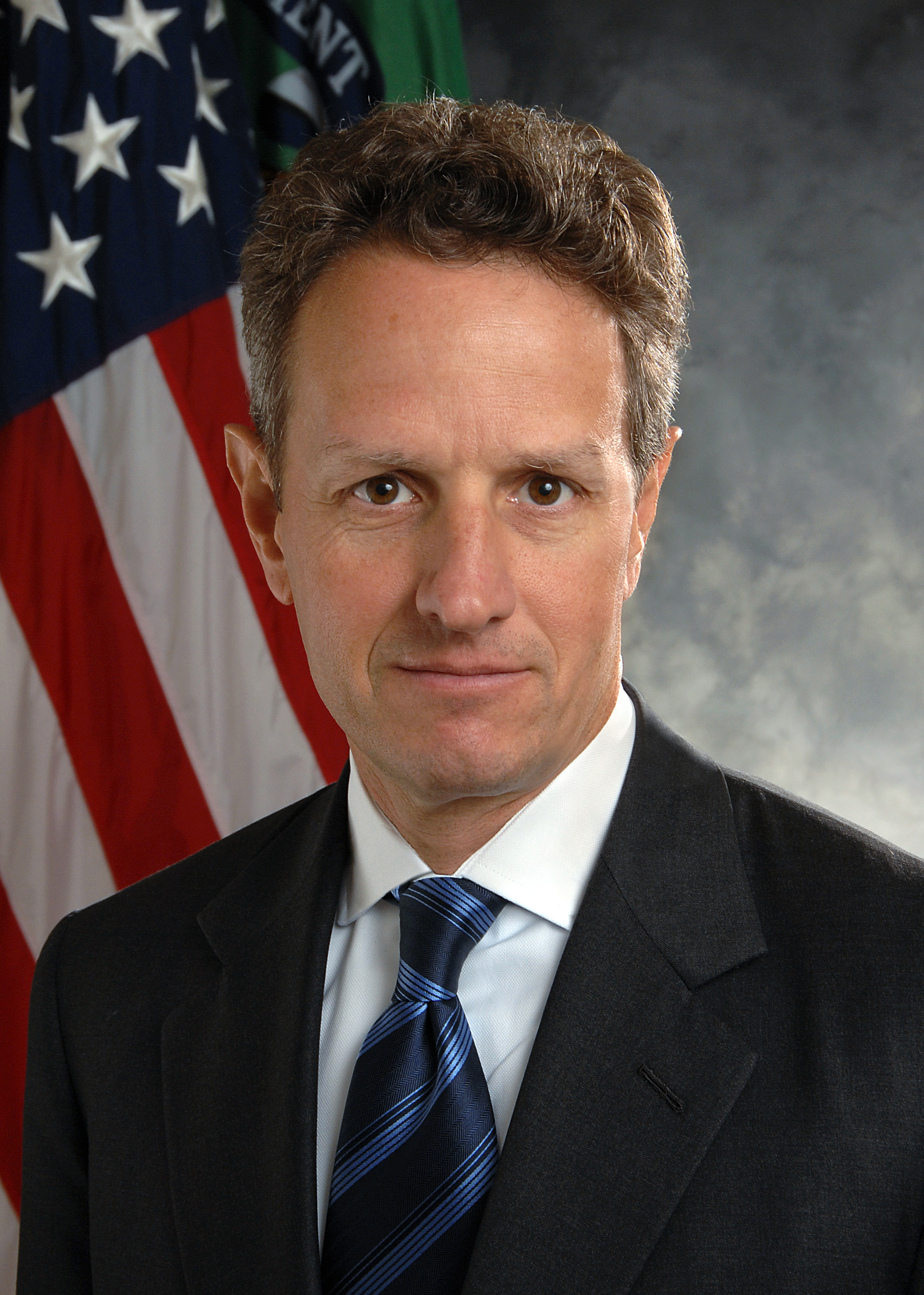
Tim Geithner

At the end of November 2008, President-elect Obama announced his intention to nominate Timothy Geithner, President of the New York Federal Reserve Bank, to be United States Secretary of the Treasury, replacing Henry Paulson. Geithner believed, along with Paulson, that the United States Department of the Treasury needed new authority to experiment with responses to the 2008 financial crisis.

In a written statement, Geithner said that China is manipulating the Renminbi by purposefully keeping its value low in order to make its exported products seem cheaper on the world market. If confirmed, Geither said to the Senate Finance Committee that he would ask the Obama administration to pressure China diplomatically to change this practice, more strongly than the Bush administration did. The United States maintains that China's actions hurt American businesses and contributed to the 2008 financial crisis.

At the Senate confirmation hearings, it was revealed through documentary evidence that Geithner had not paid $35,000 self-employment taxes for several years, even though he had acknowledged his obligation to do so, and had filed a request for, and received, a payment for half the taxes owed. The failure to pay self-employment taxes was noted during a 2006 audit by the Internal Revenue Service, in which Geithner was assessed additional taxes of $14,847 for the 2003 and 2004 tax years.

Geithner failed to pay, or to admit his failure to pay, the self-employment taxes for the 2001 and 2002 tax years until after President-elect Obama expressed his intent to nominate Geithner to be Secretary of Treasury. He also deducted the cost of his children's sleep-away camp as a dependent care expense, when only expenses for day care are eligible for the deduction. Geithner subsequently paid the IRS the additional taxes owed, and was charged interest of $15,000, but was not fined for late payment. In addition, his housekeeper's work authorization lapsed during the last three months she worked for him.

Geithner's employer at the time, the International Monetary Fund, gives its American employees the employer's half of the payroll taxes, expecting that the employees will deposit the money with the Internal Revenue Service. A report from the Senate Finance Committee documented Geithner's errors. While working for IMF, Geithner signed a tax worksheet stating his "obligation of the U.S. Social Security tax, which I will pay on my fund income" and another annual worksheet stating "I wish to apply for tax allowance of U.S. federal and state income taxes and the difference between the 'self-employed' and 'employed' obligation of the U.S. Social Security tax which I will pay on my Fund income."

In a statement to the Senate panel considering his nomination, Geithner called the tax issues "careless", "avoidable", and "unintentional" errors, and he said he wanted to "apologize to the committee for putting you in the position of having to spend so much time on these issues." Geithner testified that he used TurboTax to prepare his own return and that the tax errors are his own responsibility. The Washington Post quoted a tax expert who said that TurboTax has not been programmed to handle self-employment taxes when the user identifies himself as being employed. Geithner said at the hearing that he was always under the impression that he was an employee, not a self-employed contractor, while he served as director of the Policy Development and Review Department of IMF.

Commentator Michelle Malkin posted on her web site, "IRS employment application packets notify potential workers that the Treasury Inspector General for Tax Administration vets all candidates and current employees 'who have violated or are violating laws, rules, or regulations related to the performance of their duties.' President-elect Obama is standing by a nominee who would oversee the IRS, but might not even qualify for a lesser job at the agency." Former Speaker of the House of Representatives Newt Gingrich, who also opposes his nomination said, "The IRS did not fine him. Ask small businesses how many of them think they could avoid paying self-employment Social Security and Medicare taxes for seven years and not be fined." "Had he not been nominated for Treasury Secretary it's doubtful that he would have ever paid these taxes," Republican Senator Lindsey Graham supported Geithner's nomination, calling him "very, very competent" and "the right guy" for Secretary of the Treasury.

On January 26, 2009, the U.S. Senate confirmed Geithner's appointment by a vote of 60–34. Geithner was sworn in as Treasury Secretary by Vice President Joe Biden and witnessed by President Obama. Geithner left the administration at the end of January 25, 2013.

==== Jack Lew (2013–2017) ====
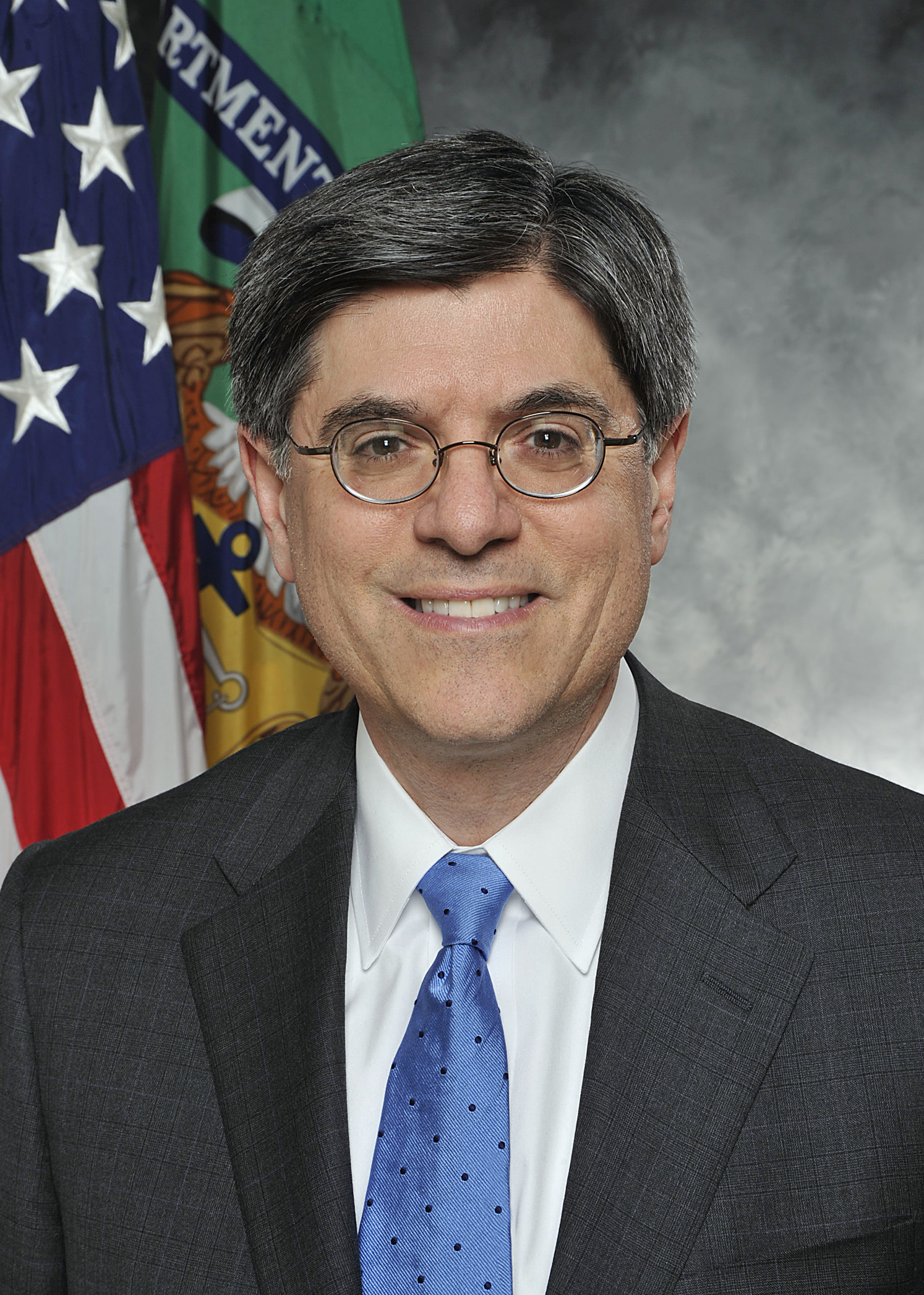
Jack Lew

On January 10, 2013, Jacob Lew, then the President's Chief of Staff was nominated as the replacement for retiring Treasury Secretary Geithner, to serve in President Obama's second term. Lew's nomination was confirmed by the full Senate on Wednesday, February 27, 2013, by a vote of 71 to 26. At the White House on the next day (Thursday, February 28), Vice President Joe Biden swore in Lew as the 76th Secretary of the Treasury.

=== Secretary of Defense ===
The Secretary of Defense designate is reviewed and presented to the full Senate by the Senate Armed Services Committee.

==== Robert Gates (2006–2011) ====
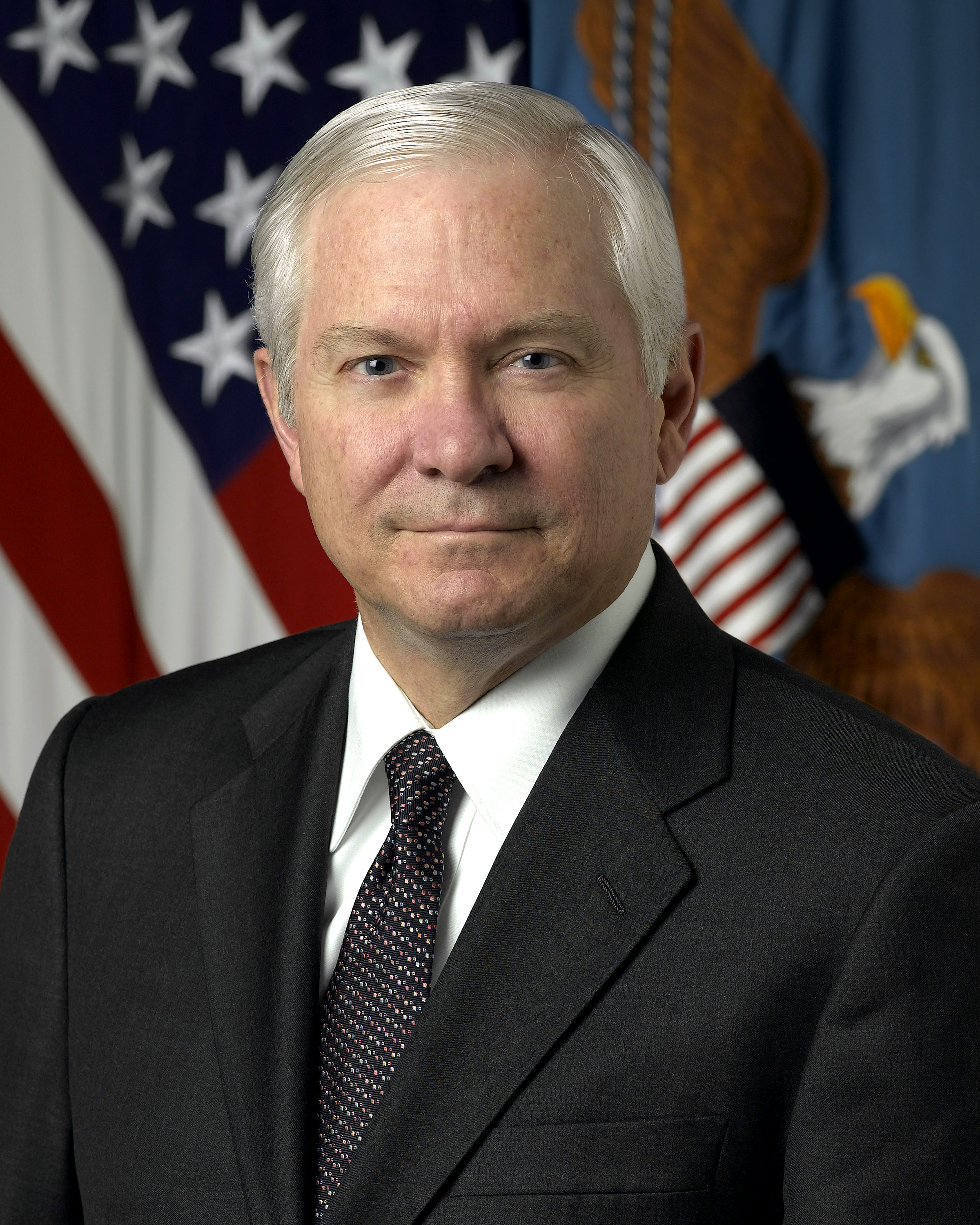
Robert Gates

Robert Gates assumed the office of Secretary of Defense on December 18, 2006, under his predecessor then-President George W. Bush. The retention of Gates fulfilled Obama's pledge made on the campaign trail to have a Republican in his Cabinet.

On December 1, 2008, President-elect Obama announced that Robert Gates would remain in his position as Secretary of Defense during his administration, reportedly for at least the first year of Obama's presidency.

Gates is the fourteenth Cabinet member in history to serve under two Presidents of different parties. One of the first priorities under President Barack Obama's administration for Gates was a review of U.S. policy and strategy in Afghanistan. Gates, sixth in the presidential line of succession, was selected as designated survivor during Obama's inauguration.

==== Leon Panetta (2011–2013) ====
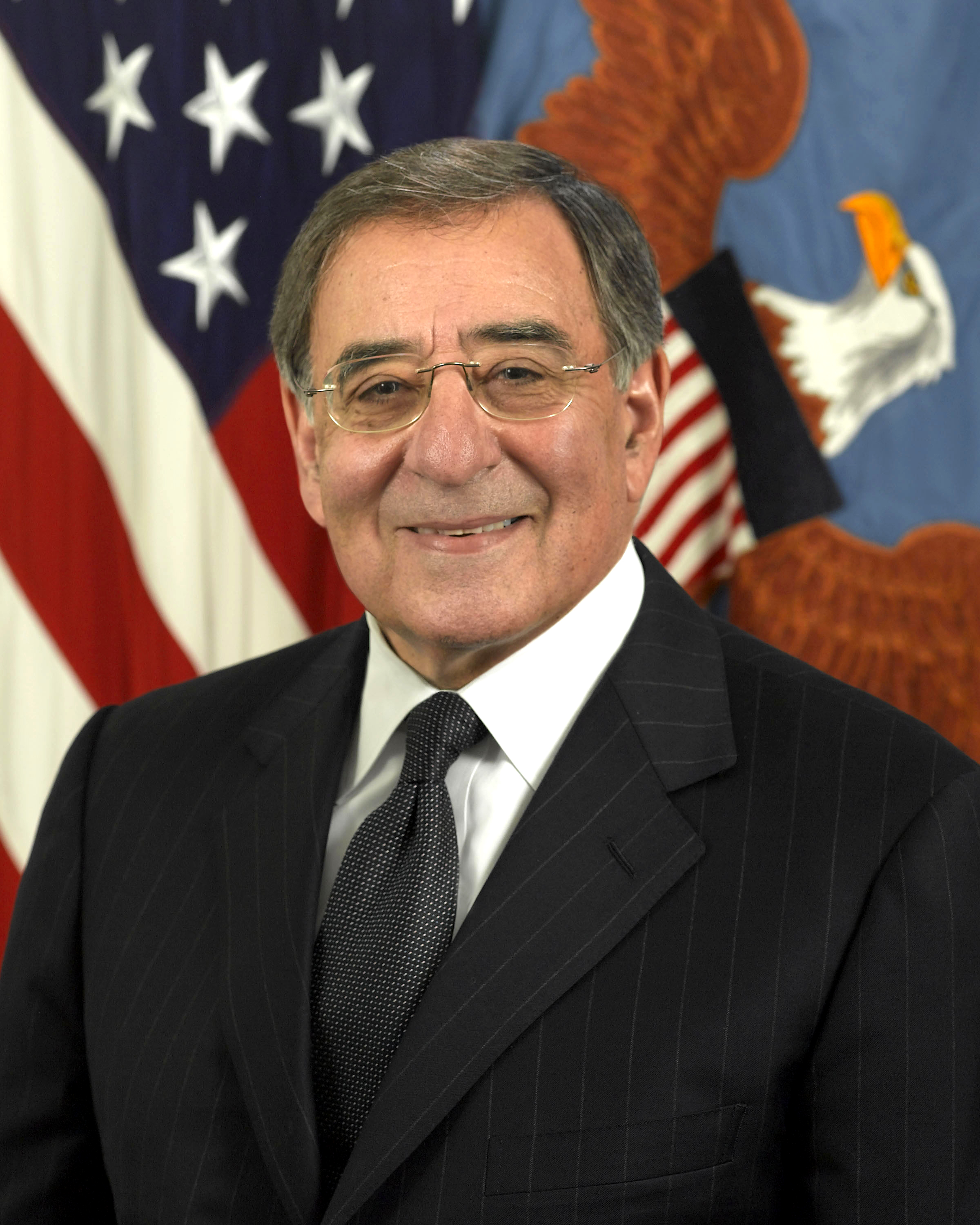
Leon Panetta

On April 18, 2011, Leon Panetta, the Director of the Central Intelligence Agency, was nominated to replace Gates. On June 21, 2011, the United States Senate confirmed Panetta in a 100–0 vote. He took office on July 1, 2011.

==== Chuck Hagel (2013–2015) ====
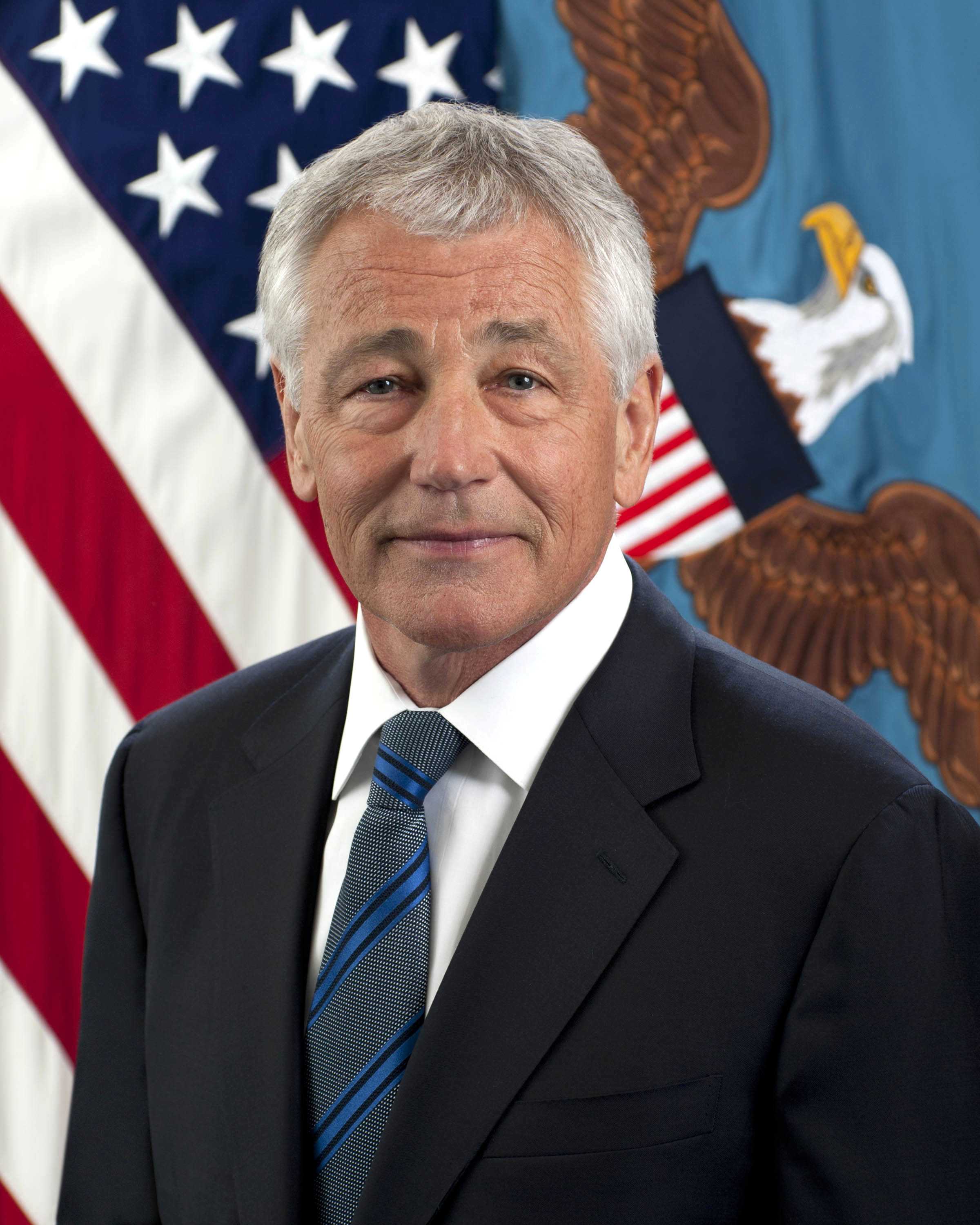
Chuck Hagel

Obama nominated former Senator Chuck Hagel (R-NE) to succeed Leon Panetta and serve as his second term Secretary of Defense on January 7, 2013. U.S. Senate nomination hearings begin on January 31, 2013. On February 26, 2013, after debate in the full Senate had been closed by a vote of 71 to 27, Hagel's nomination was confirmed 58–41 (1 not voting). All the negative votes on each roll call came from Republican Senators, while 18 Republicans voted for cloture of debate and 4 for final confirmation. He took office on February 27, 2013.

On November 24, 2014, The New York Times reported that Hagel would be resigning from his position as Secretary of Defense under pressure from the Obama administration. Later that day, President Obama announced Hagel's resignation and thanked him for his service. Hagel said in a statement, "You should know I did not make this decision lightly. But after much discussion, the President and I agreed that now was the right time for new leadership here at the Pentagon." Hagel stayed on until the confirmation of his successor.

==== Ash Carter (2015–2017) ====
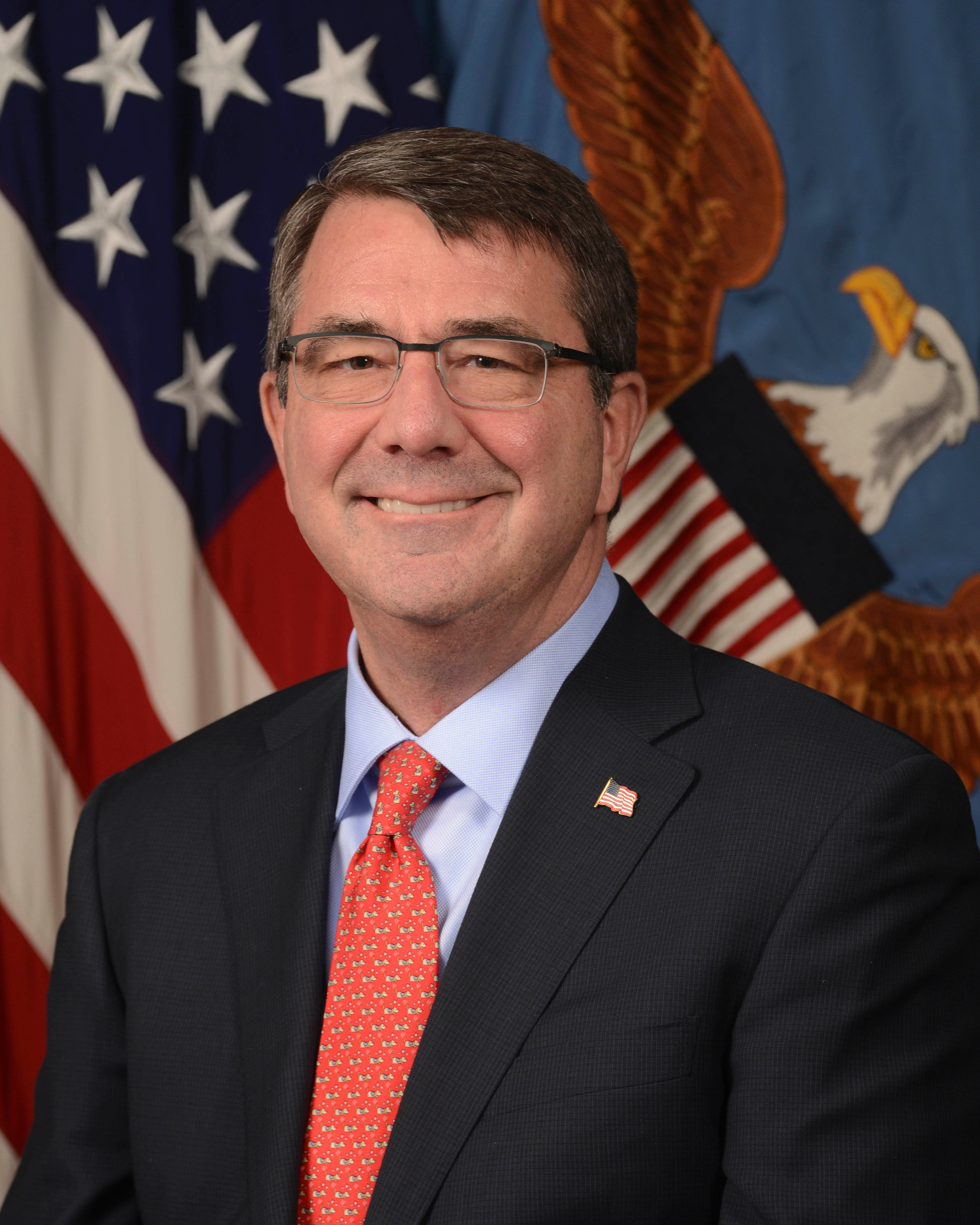
Ash Carter

On December 5, 2014, President Obama nominated former Deputy Secretary of Defense Ash Carter as his fourth Secretary of Defense. On February 12, 2015, the Senate confirmed Carter in a 93–5 vote. He took office on February 17, 2015.

=== Attorney General ===
The confirmation of the office of Attorney General is overseen by the Senate Judiciary Committee.

==== Eric Holder (2009–2015) ====
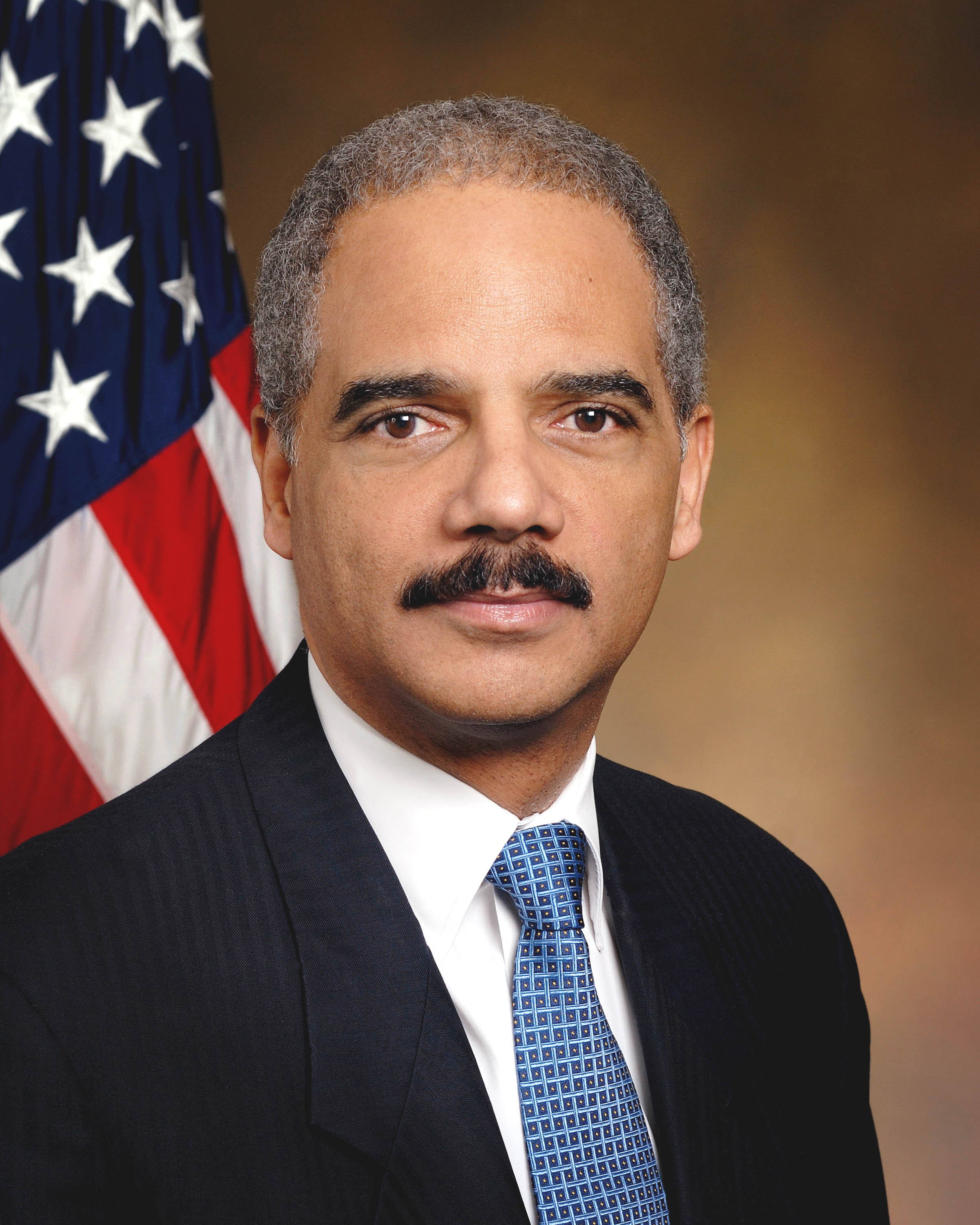
Eric Holder

On December 1, 2008, Obama announced that Eric Holder would be his nominee for Attorney General. Holder was formally nominated on January 20, 2009, and approved by the Senate Judiciary Committee on January 28. Following his confirmation by the full Senate by a 75–21 vote on February 2, 2009, he became the first African-American Attorney General of the United States.

In late 2007, Holder joined then-United States Senator Barack Obama's presidential campaign as a senior legal advisor. He served on Obama's vice presidential selection committee.

Holder favors closing the Guantanamo Bay detention camp, although he has said that the detainees are not technically entitled to Geneva convention protections. He is opposed to the Bush administration's implementation of the Patriot Act, saying it is "bad ultimately for law enforcement and will cost us the support of the American people." He has been critical of US torture policy and the NSA warrantless surveillance program, accusing the Bush administration of a "disrespect for the rule of law... [that is] not only wrong, it is destructive in our struggle against terrorism."

During his confirmation hearings in the Senate, Holder agreed with Senator Patrick Leahy, Democrat of Vermont, that a technique used by U.S. interrogators under the Bush administration known as waterboarding is torture.

On September 25, 2014, Holder announced that he would resign his post upon confirmation of a successor.

==== Loretta Lynch (2015–2017) ====
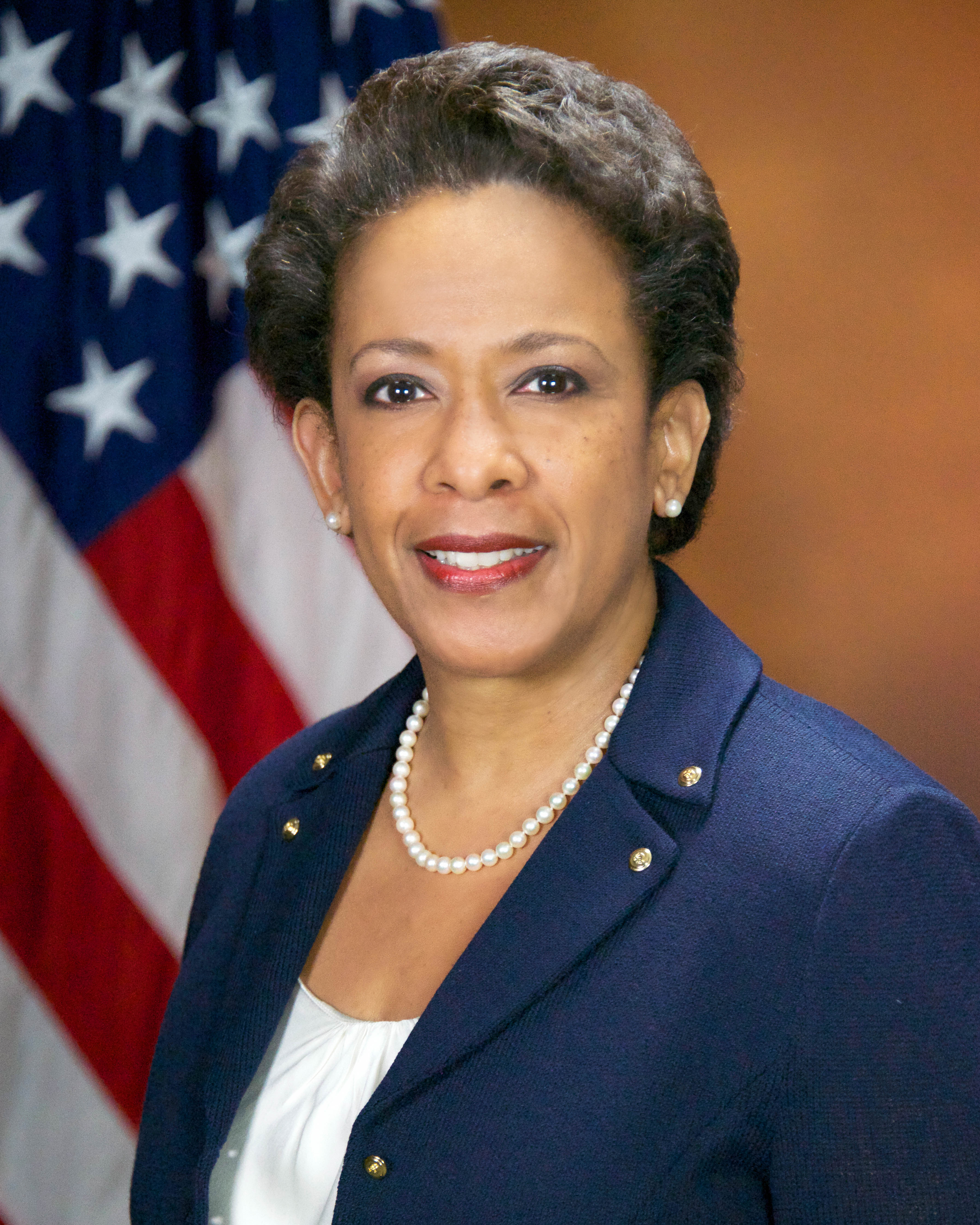
Loretta Lynch

On November 8, 2014, President Barack Obama nominated U.S. Attorney Loretta Lynch to succeed Eric Holder as the next Attorney General of the United States. After a contentious nomination process, the Senate confirmed Lynch on April 23, 2015, in a 56–43 vote.

=== Secretary of the Interior ===
The nomination of the Secretary of the Interior is presented to the full senate by the Senate Committee on Energy and Natural Resources.

==== Ken Salazar (2009–2013) ====
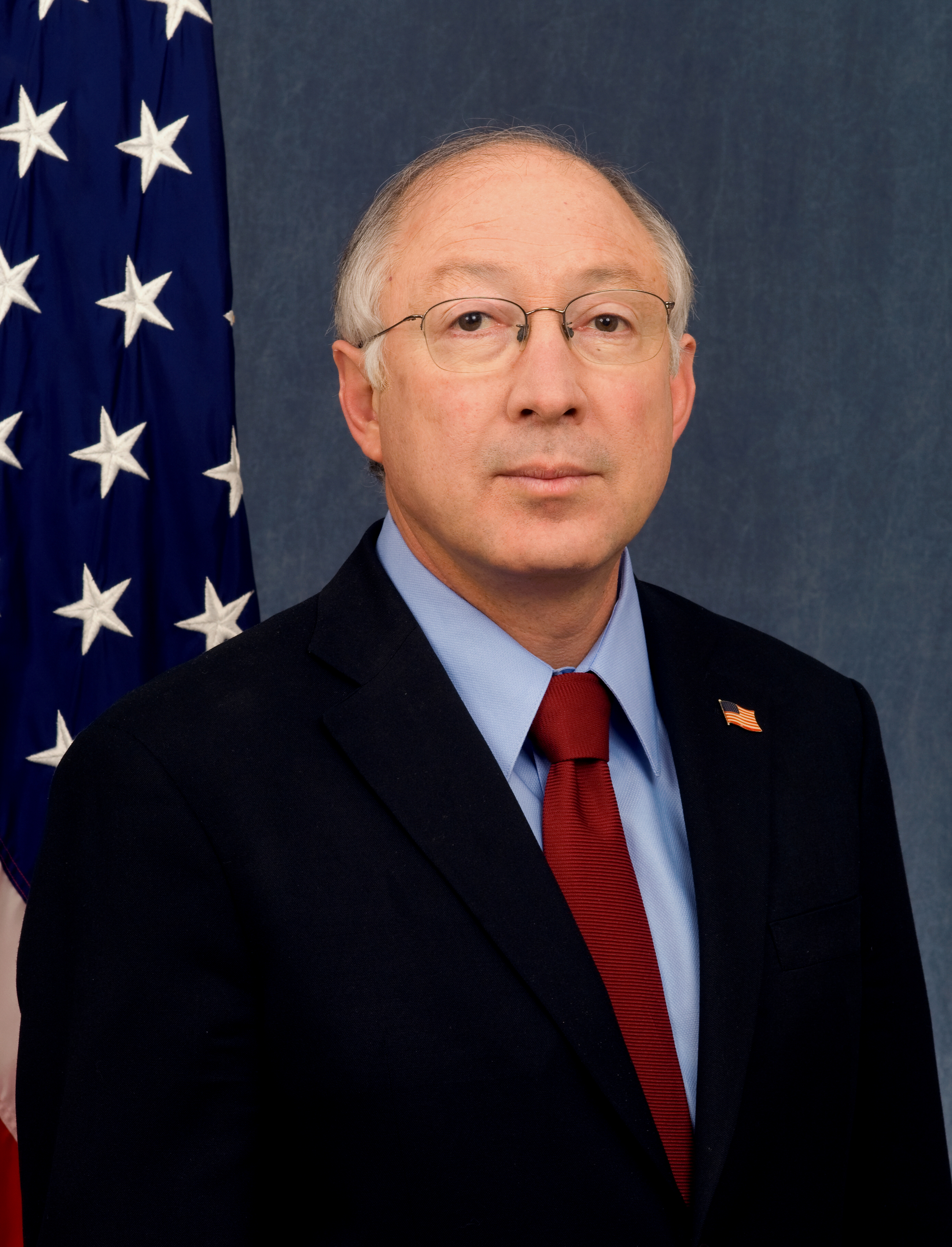
Ken Salazar

Ken Salazar assumed the office of Secretary of the Interior on January 21, 2009, after a unanimous voice vote on the floor of the full Senate. Colorado Gov. Bill Ritter appointed Denver Superintendent of Schools Michael Bennet to replace Salazar and to finish his term in the Senate, which expired in January 2011. Bennet was elected to a full term in 2010.

Salazar was nominated as Secretary of the Interior on December 19, 2008. His appointment required a Saxbe fix by Congress. On January 7, 2009, Congress approved a bill, S.J.Res. 3; President Bush signed it into law, providing such a fix by reducing the Secretary of Interior's salary to the level it was prior to the time Salazar took office in January 2009.

The Senate confirmed Salazar's nomination by voice vote on January 20, 2009, shortly after the swearing in of President Obama. As Secretary of the Interior, Salazar is in charge of the National Park Service, the Bureau of Land Management, the United States Fish and Wildlife Service, the United States Geological Survey, and other federal agencies overseen by the Interior Department.

Salazar was one of two Hispanics in the Cabinet, along with Secretary of Labor Hilda Solis of California. (There were three, but on January 4, 2009, Democratic New Mexico Gov. Bill Richardson withdrew his name from the appointment of Secretary of Commerce). Salazar is the second Hispanic Interior Secretary after Manuel Lujan Jr., who held the post from 1989 to 1993 under President George H. W. Bush.

Several prominent environmentalist groups are wary of Salazar, noting his strong ties with the coal and mining industries. Kieran Suckling, executive director of Center for Biological Diversity, which tracks endangered species and habitat issues states "He [Ken Salazar] is a right-of-center Democrat who often favors industry and big agriculture in battles over global warming, fuel efficiency and endangered species."

The nomination was praised, however, by Gene Karpinski, President of the League of Conservation Voters. Upon the nomination, Karpinski said, "Throughout his career, Senator Salazar has campaigned on a pledge of support for 'our land, our water, our people.' With a perfect 100% score on the 2008 LCV Scorecard, he has lived up to that pledge. As a westerner, Senator Salazar has hands on experience with land and water issues, and will restore the Department of the Interior's role as the steward of America's public resources. We look forward to working with him to protect the health of America's land, water, and people in the coming years."

Although Senate Republicans were expected to raise questions concerning Salazar's stances on oil shale development and drilling in environmentally sensitive areas, Salazar was one of several Obama Cabinet appointees confirmed in the Senate by voice vote on January 20, 2009, shortly after Obama's inauguration. Salazar became the 50th Secretary of the Interior succeeding Dirk Kempthorne, who praised Salazar's appointment.

On January 23, 2009, Salazar has stated that he is considering reopening the Statue of Liberty's crown to tourists. The crown has been closed to the public since the September 11 attacks. "I hope we can find a way," Salazar said in a statement. "It would proclaim to the world—both figuratively and literally—that the path to the light of liberty is open to all."

==== Sally Jewell (2013–2017) ====
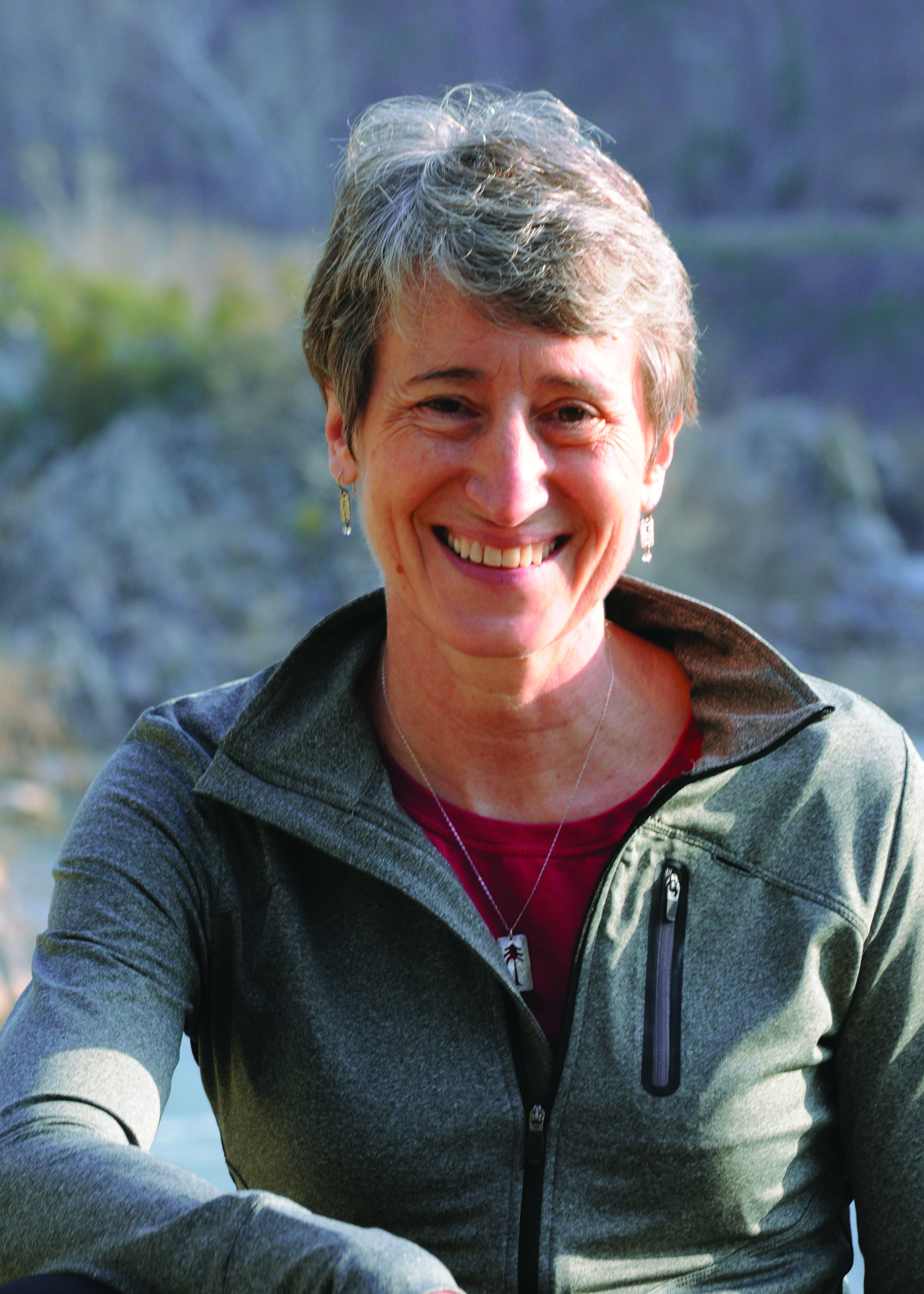
Sally Jewell

On January 16, 2013, it was reported that Salazar would be leaving his post as Secretary of the Interior in March 2013. On February 6, 2013, President Obama nominated the CEO of REI, Sally Jewell, as Secretary of the Interior. The Senate confirmed Jewell's nomination by an 87–11 vote on April 10, 2013.

=== Secretary of Agriculture ===
The nomination of the Secretary of Agriculture is brought to the full Senate by the Senate Agriculture, Nutrition and Forestry Committee. Tom Vilsack assumed the office of Secretary of Agriculture on January 21, 2009, after a unanimous voice vote of the whole Senate.

==== Tom Vilsack (2009–2017) ====
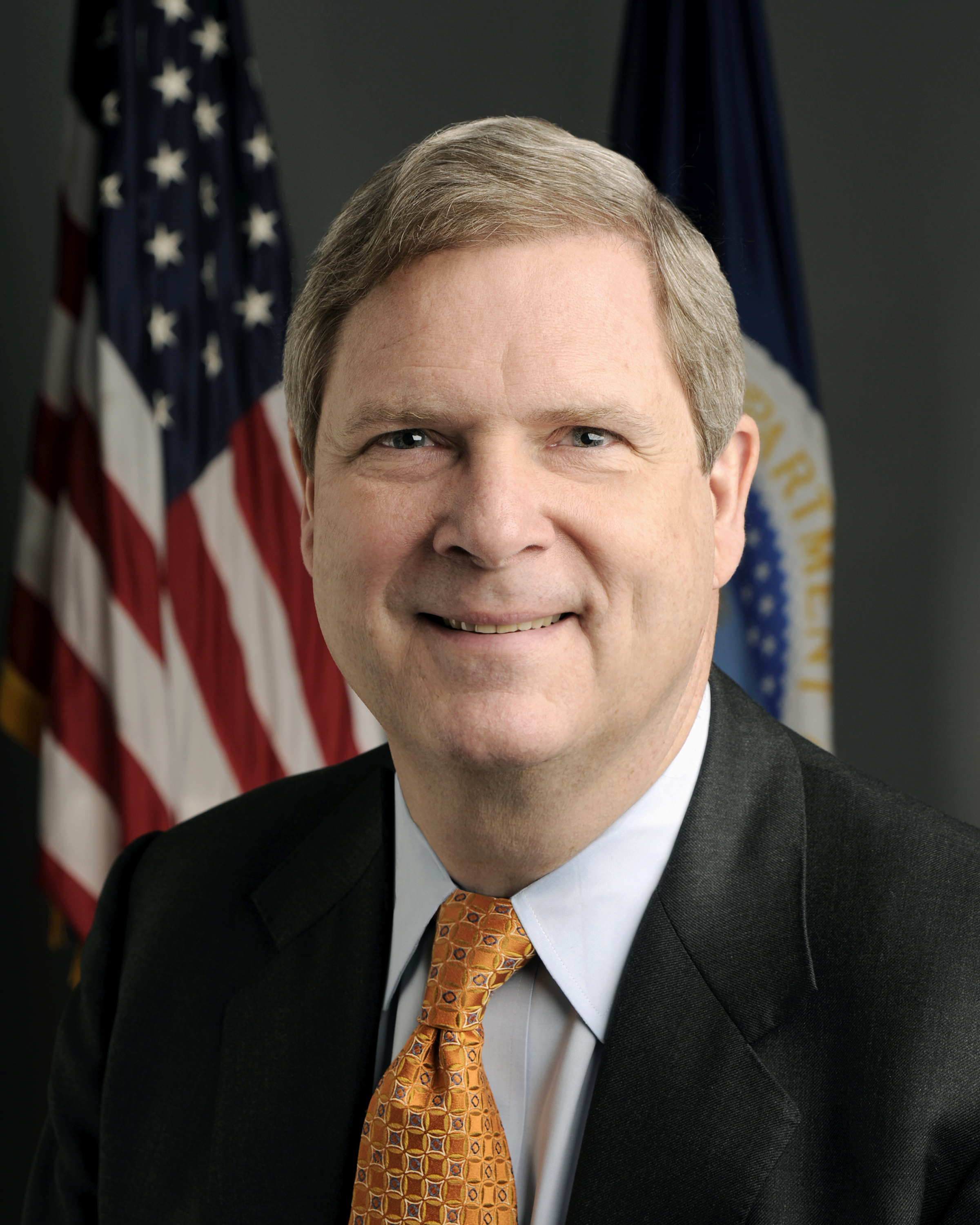
Tom Vilsack

On December 17, 2008, then-President-elect Barack Obama announced his choice of Vilsack as the nominee to be the next Secretary of Agriculture. Vilsack has governed a farm state (Iowa) as did the previous two Secretaries of Agriculture, Senator Mike Johanns (2005–2007) and Ed Schafer (2007–2009). Reaction to Vilsack's nomination from agricultural groups was largely positive and included endorsements from the Corn Refiners Association, the National Grain and Feed Association, the National Farmers Union, the American Farm Bureau Federation, and the Environmental Defense Fund. Opposition to the nomination came those who believed Vilsack has a preference for large industrial farms and genetically modified crops; as Iowa state governor, he originated the seed pre-emption bill in 2005, effectively blocking local communities from regulating where genetically engineered crops would be grown; additionally, Vilsack was the founder and former chair of the Governor's Biotechnology Partnership, and was named Governor of the Year by the Biotechnology Industry Organization, an industry lobbying group. The Senate confirmed Vilsack's nomination for the position by unanimous consent on January 20, 2009.

=== Secretary of Commerce ===
The nomination of the Secretary of Commerce is brought to the full Senate by the Commerce, Science and Transportation Committee.

==== Failed nomination of Bill Richardson (2009) ====
Bill Richardson was nominated for the position of Secretary of Commerce on December 3, 2008. Nevertheless, due to federal investigation into some of his political donors, he withdrew himself from the nomination on January 4, 2009.

==== Failed nomination of Judd Gregg (2009) ====
On February 3, 2009, President Obama nominated New Hampshire Senator Judd Gregg, a Republican. The nomination initially drew criticism, as it would likely give the Democrats in the Senate a super-majority, assuming Al Franken would be seated from Minnesota (as he eventually was) and the two independents regularly voted with the Democrats. Republican Senator Gregg would have been replaced by someone chosen by the state's Governor John Lynch, a Democrat.

Initially, Senator Mitch McConnell announced that he would prevent an attempt to achieve a super majority by the President. After talks, President Obama as well as Senator Gregg assured that it would not be used as an attempt to change the makeup of the Senate.

On February 12, Senator Gregg announced that he had withdrawn from nomination, citing his fundamental disagreement with the Obama administration on "issues such as the stimulus package and the Census."

==== Gary Locke (2009–2011) ====
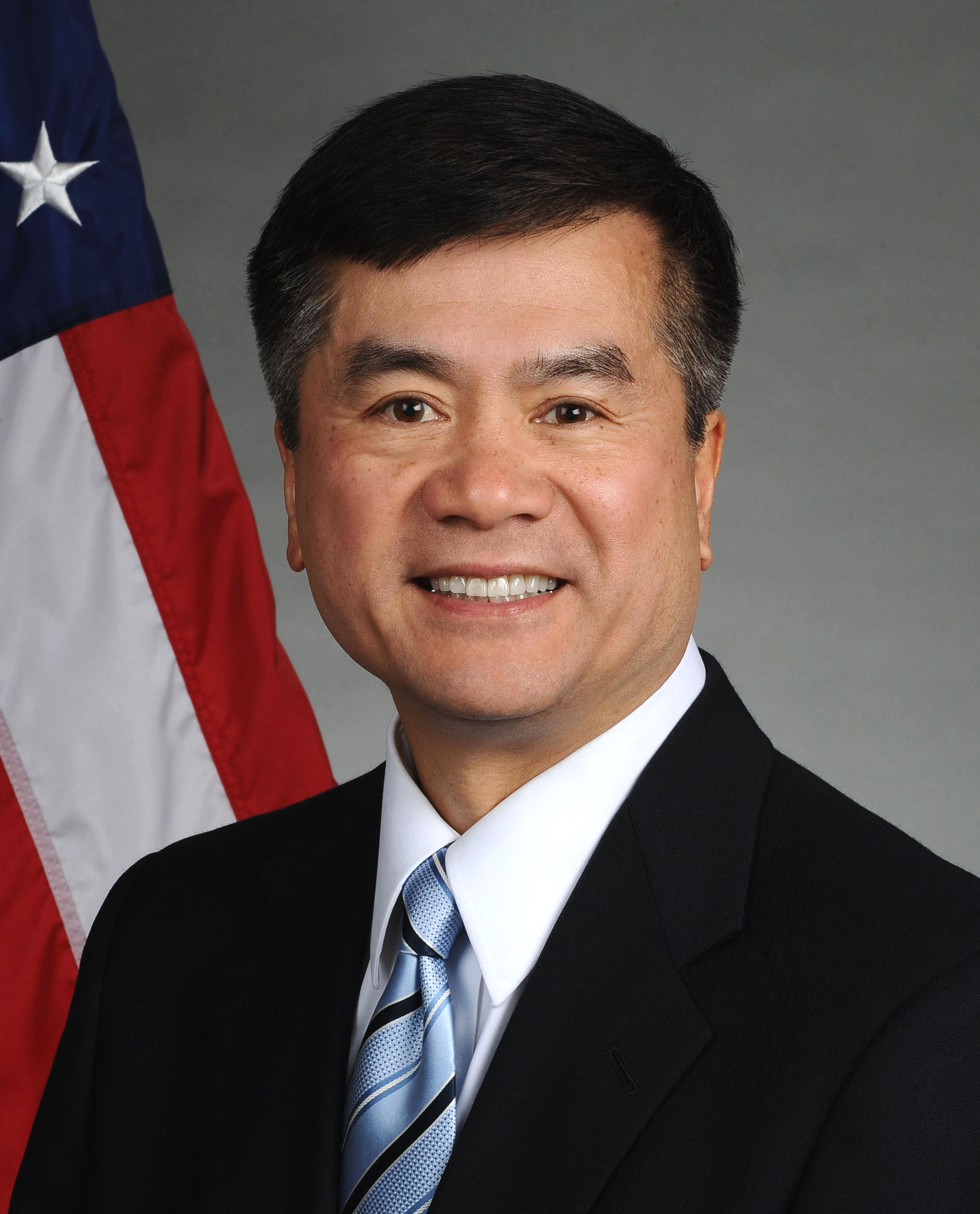
Gary Locke

Former Washington Governor Gary Locke was designated as the third Commerce nominee, multiple media outlets reported on February 23, 2009. An official announcement was made at a press conference with Locke and President Obama. After confirmation by a voice vote on March 24, Locke became the first Chinese American Secretary of Commerce, and the third Asian American in Obama's cabinet, joining Energy Secretary Steven Chu and Veterans Affairs Secretary Eric Shinseki, the most of any administration in United States history.

==== John Bryson (2011–2012) ====
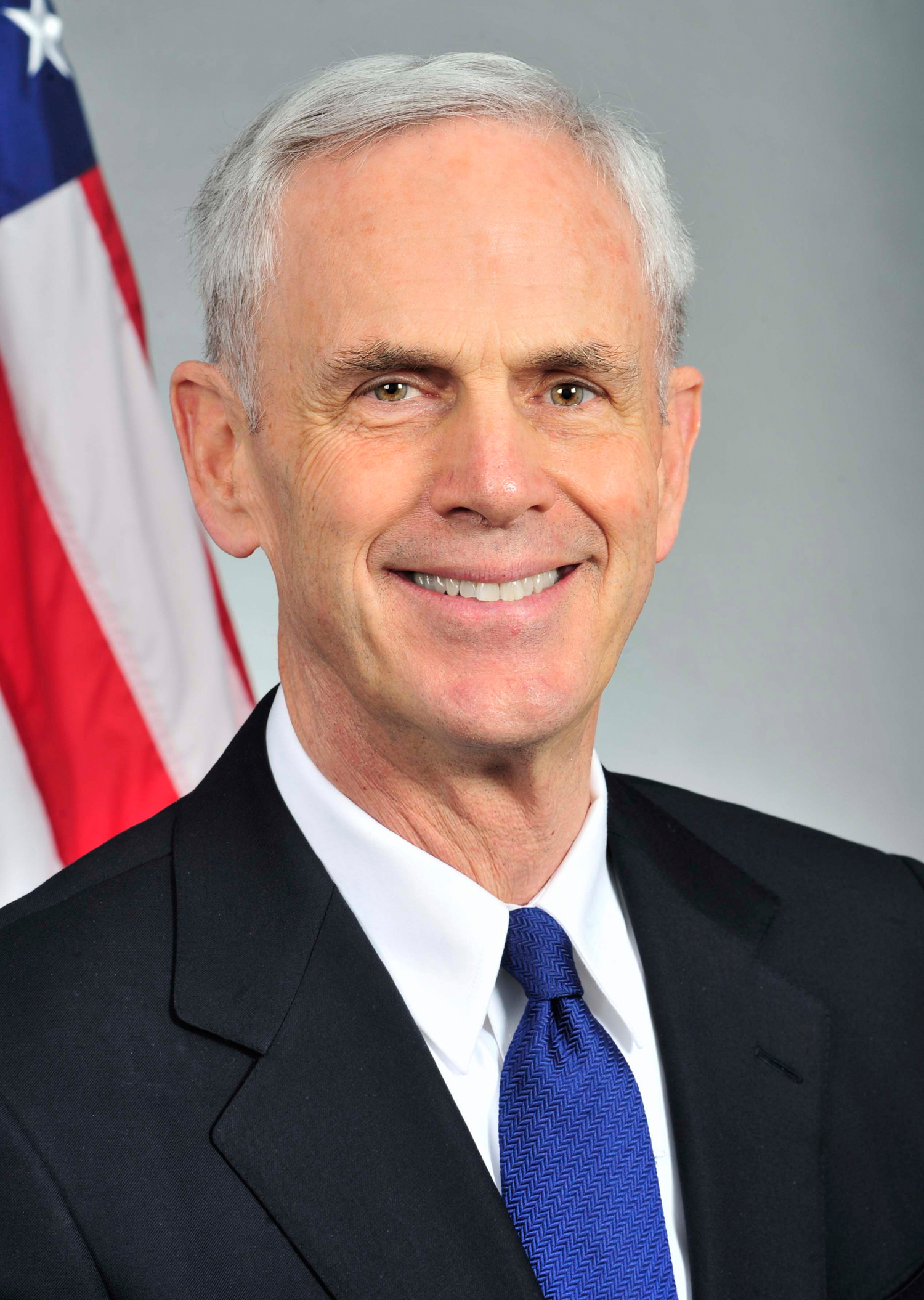
John Bryson

In May 2011, Obama appointed Locke as the new U.S. ambassador to China and nominated John Bryson as the next Secretary of Commerce. Citing Bryson's environmental views, U.S. Sen. James Inhofe (R-Oklahoma) put a hold on his nomination in July. The Senate confirmed Bryson as Secretary of Commerce by a 74–26 vote on October 20, 2011. He was sworn in on October 21, 2011. Bryson took a leave of absence in June 2012 for medical tests due to seizures that were related to a hit and run. On June 21, 2012, Bryson resigned because, "the work that [Commerce employees] do to help America's entrepreneurs and businesses build our economy and create jobs is more important now than ever and I have come to the conclusion that I need to step down to prevent distractions from this critical mission." Deputy Secretary Rebecca Blank served as Acting Secretary of Commerce without Senate confirmation following Bryson's resignation in June 2012 until Penny Pritzker's confirmation in June 2013.

==== Penny Pritzker (2013–2017) ====
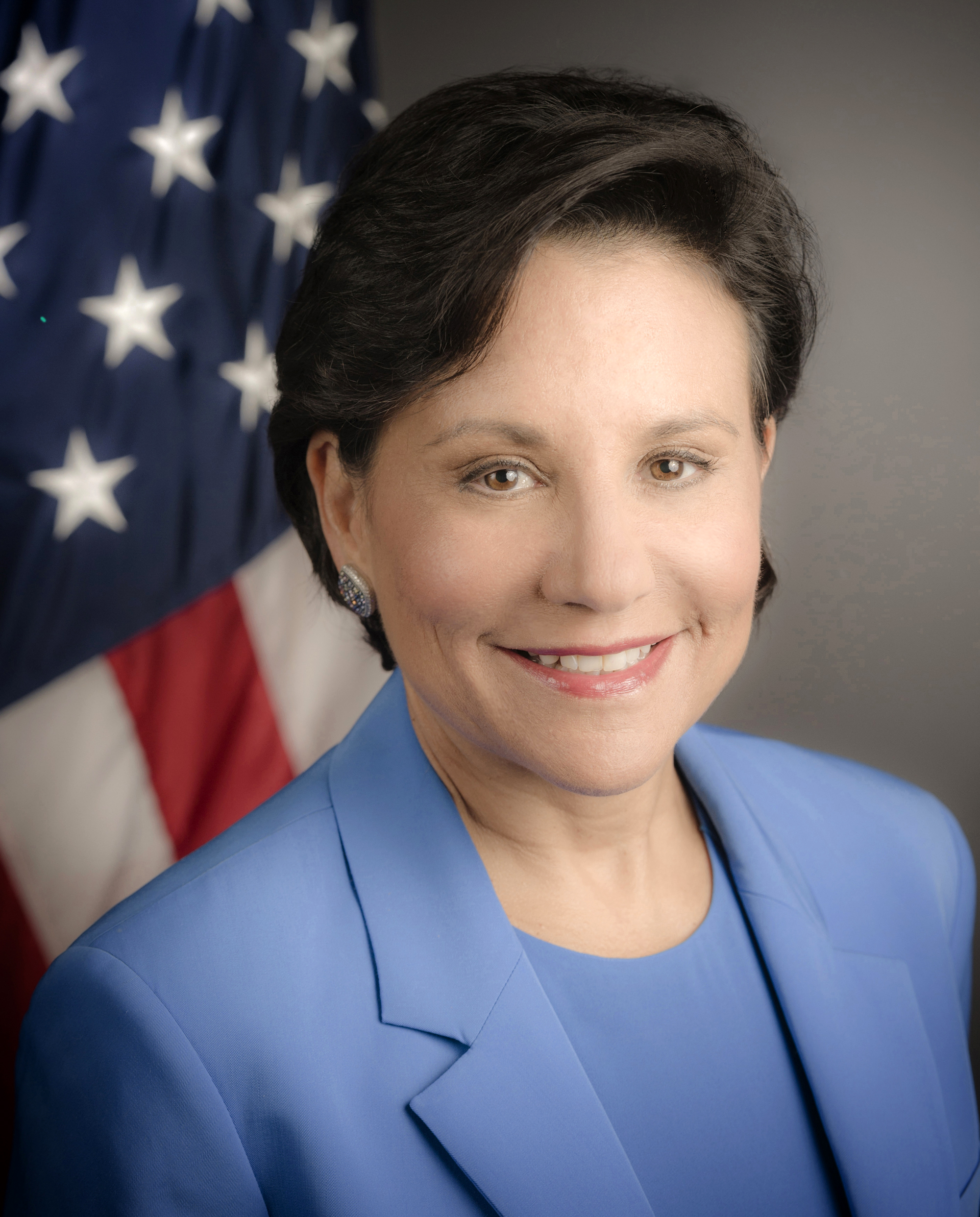
Penny Pritzker

On May 2, 2013, President Obama announced the nomination of hotel magnate Penny Pritzker as Secretary of Commerce. On June 10, 2013, the Commerce, Science and Technology Committee unanimously approved Pritzker's nomination. On June 25, 2013, Pritzker was confirmed by the full Senate by a vote of 97 to 1.

=== Secretary of Labor ===
The Secretary of Labor is confirmed through the Senate Health, Education, Labor, and Pensions Committee.

==== Hilda Solis (2009–2013) ====
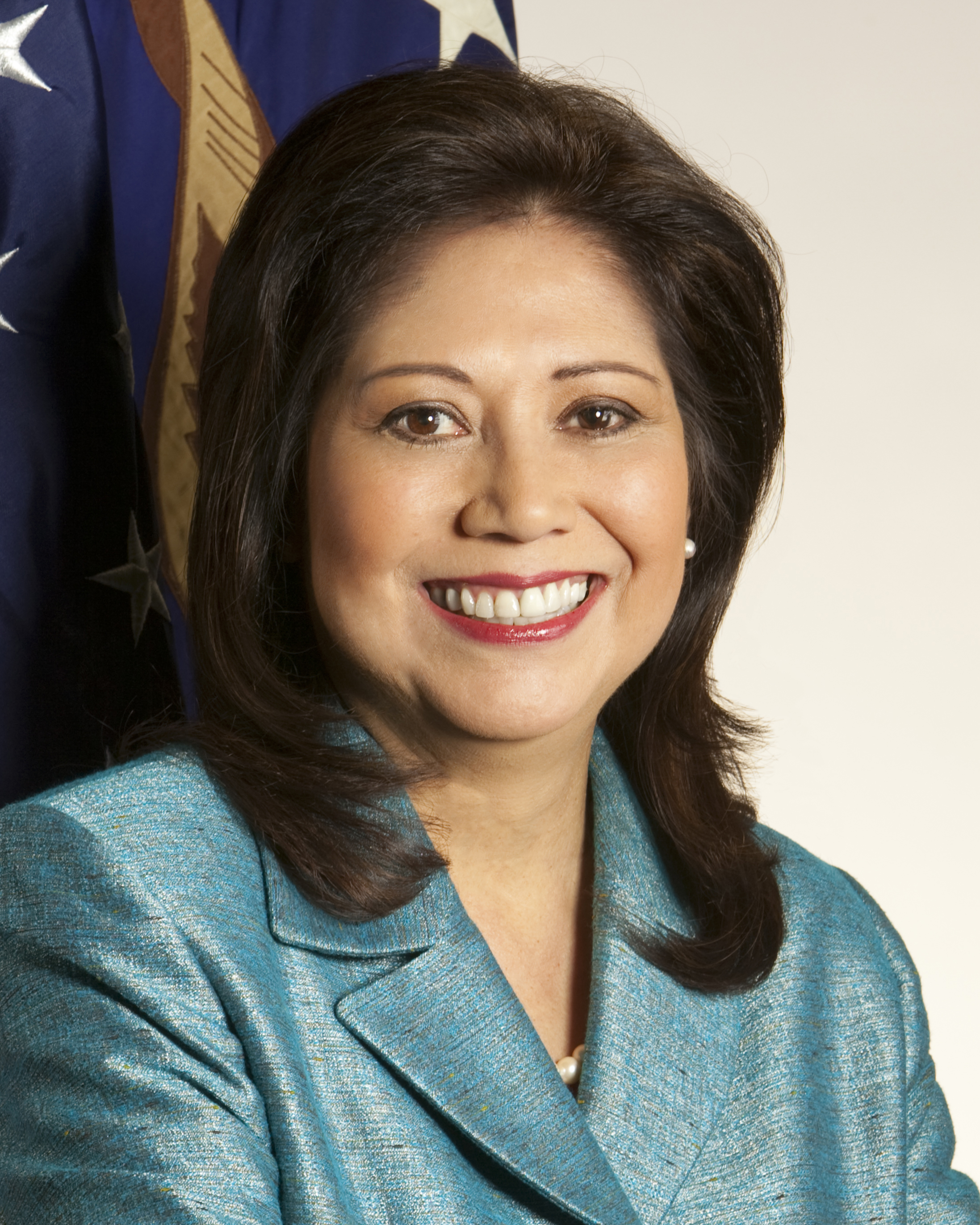
Hilda Solis

Hilda Solis assumed office as Secretary of Labor on February 24, 2009, when she was confirmed by the Senate by a vote of 80–17, although her confirmation hearings had been stalled due to Republican concerns over her support of the Employee Free Choice Act and her desire to reverse the Bush administration's policies to the H-2A Guest Worker Act and tax problems with her husband. On February 11, 2009, Solis's nomination passed the committee phase.

On December 18, 2008, sources close to the Obama transition team identified Solis as the President-elect's choice for U.S. Secretary of Labor, the last cabinet position yet to be filled.

The selection earned praise from the AFL–CIO and other labor organizations, but it brought dismay from business and anti-labor groups. The official announcement was made by Obama on December 19. Her appointment required a Saxbe fix. Due to her confirmation, Solis's successor, Judy Chu was chosen in a special election in California's 32nd congressional district; she declined to endorse any particular replacement candidate.

Solis's confirmation hearings were held on January 9, 2009, before the Senate Health, Education, Labor, and Pensions Committee. Committee chair Ted Kennedy repeatedly praised her, while despite some prodding from Republican members, Solis declined to discuss specific policy issues including the Employee Free Choice Act. Several days later, Senate Republicans said they might try to put a procedural hold on her nomination, out of frustration with her unwillingness to answer questions during the hearings.

Committee Republican Mike Enzi also pressed her on whether her unpaid but high-level positions at American Rights at Work constituted a prohibited lobbying activity; she said she had done no lobbying and was in violation of no rules of conduct. Solis did acknowledge that she had failed to report those positions on her annual House financial disclosure forms at the time, which the White House said was an unintentional oversight. After more time passed with no motion on her nomination, Obama appointed veteran Labor Department official Edward C. Hugler as Acting Secretary.

The prolonged process was seen as foreshadowing continued battles between the Obama administration and Republicans over labor issues. Solis's confirmation process was then set to for a committee vote on February 5, but was postponed again after news that Solis' husband Sam Sayyad had just paid $6,400 in outstanding state and local tax liens for his auto repair business going back to 1993. Sayyad was sole proprietor of the business, filed a separate tax return from Solis, and intended to contest the lien as they were for business taxes he thought he had already paid.

The White House said Solis should not be penalized for any mistakes that her husband may have made. The revelations came in the wake of several other Obama nominations troubled or derailed due to tax issues. Committee Republicans subsequently indicated they would not hold Solis to blame for the taxes situation, but were still concerned about her ties to American Rights at Work. On February 11, 2009, the committee finally supported her nomination by voice vote with two dissensions.

==== Thomas Perez (2013–2017) ====
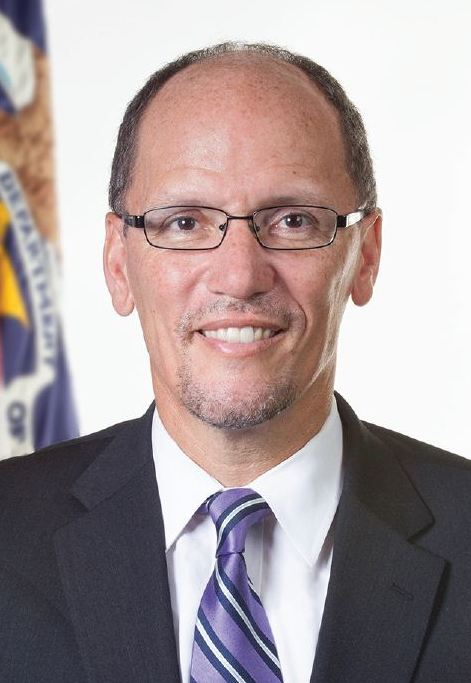
Tom Perez

On January 9, 2013, Hilda Solis announced she would not stay on for Obama's second term and that she was resigning. On March 18, 2013, President Obama nominated assistant U.S. Attorney General Thomas Perez for labor secretary.

Republicans opposed the nomination because they saw him as a "committed ideologue". On May 16, 2013, Perez's nomination was endorsed by the committee along party lines. The vote sent the nomination to the Senate floor.

On July 18, 2013, Perez was confirmed as labor secretary after senators reached a deal to avert changing the chamber's rules with his nomination getting 60 votes to break the filibuster. The Senate ultimately confirmed Perez on a party-line vote, 54–46.

=== Secretary of Health and Human Services ===
The nomination of the Secretary of Health and Human Services is brought to the full Senate by the Senate Finance Committee, though the nominee also historically meets with the United States Senate Committee on Health, Education, Labor and Pensions.

==== Failed nomination of Tom Daschle (2009) ====
Former Senate Majority Leader Tom Daschle was President Obama's first nominee for the Secretary of Health and Human Services. Daschle was paid $220,000 in speaking fees to Healthcare providers, and was paid $16 million as an advisor to Healthcare lobbying groups in the time between his departure from the US Senate and his nomination. Daschle pulled his name from nomination on February 3, 2009.

==== Kathleen Sebelius (2009–2014) ====
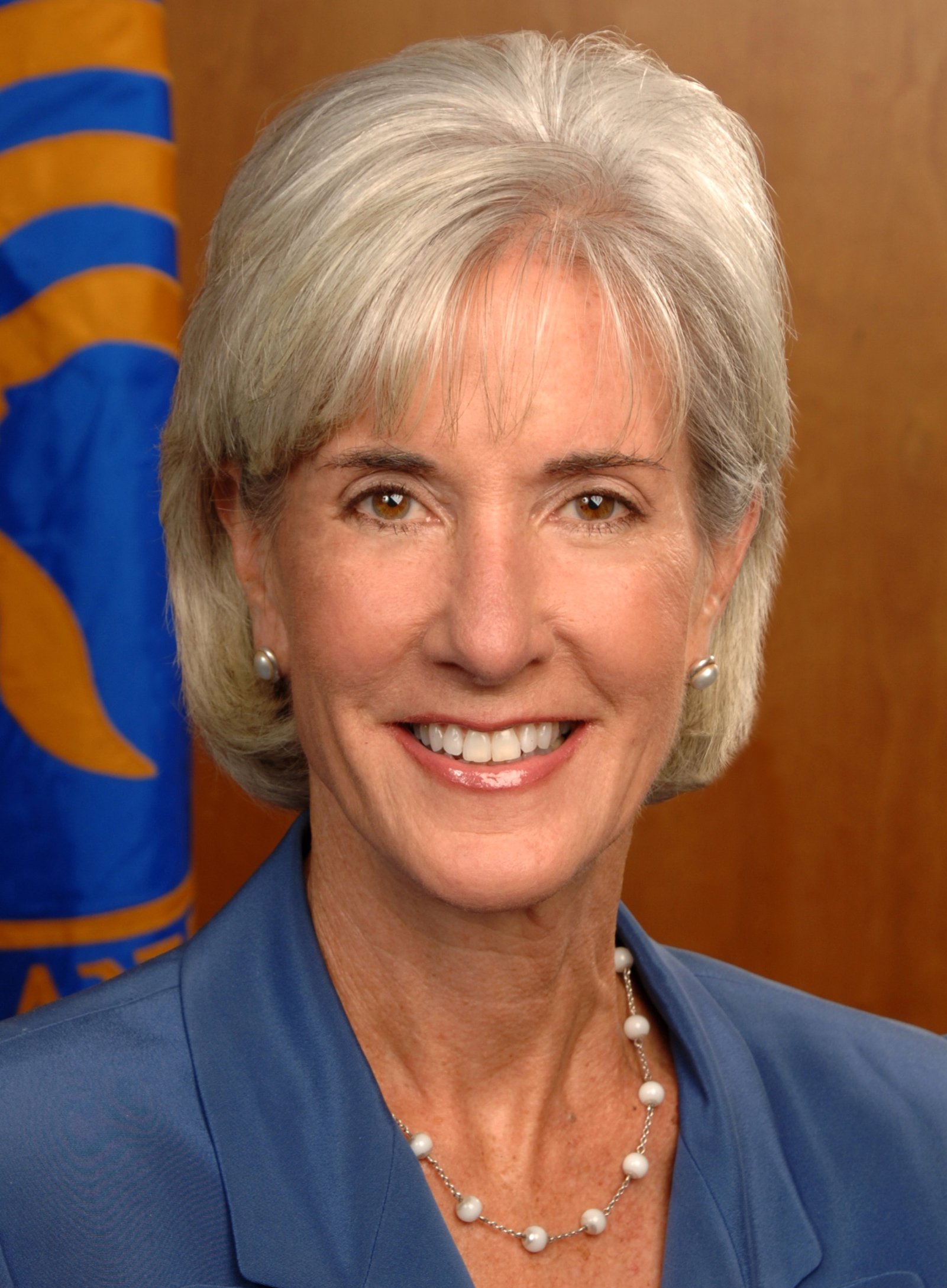
Kathleen Sebelius

On March 2, 2009, President Barack Obama introduced Kansas Governor Kathleen Sebelius as his choice to fill the office of Secretary of Health and Human Services. Sebelius was confirmed by the United States Senate on April 28, 2009, on a vote of 65–31 amid the swine flu health crisis.

In April 2013, after the rocky start of HealthCare.gov, the website set up to enroll Americans in insurance exchanges, Sebelius decided to resign as Secretary as according to Sebelius the March 31, 2014, deadline for sign-ups under the health care law provided an opportunity for change so that Obama would be best served by someone who was not the target of so much political ire.

==== Sylvia Mathews Burwell (2014–2017) ====
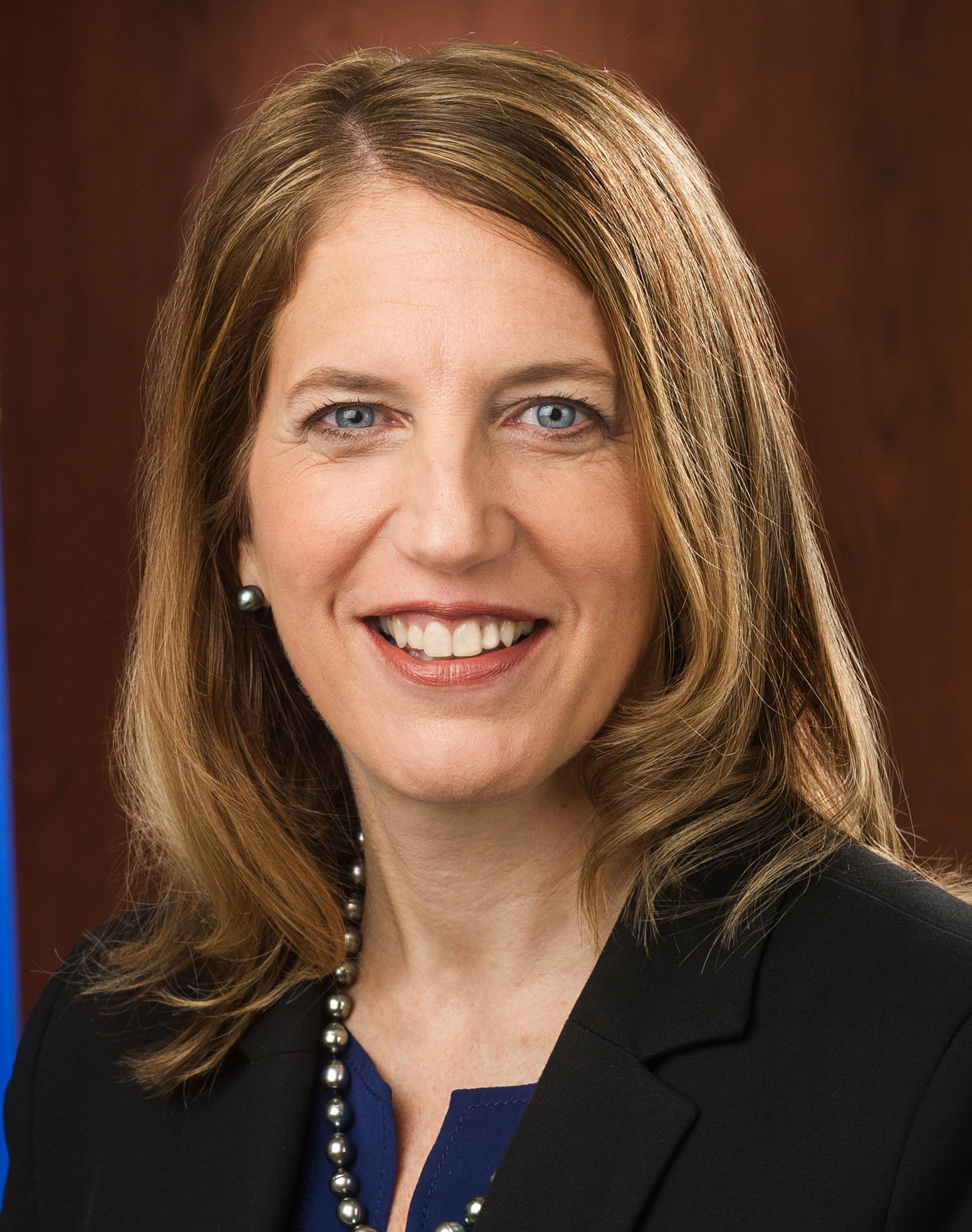
Sylvia Mathews Burwell

After the resignation of Sebelius was announced, it was revealed that on April 11, 2014, President Obama would nominate Sylvia Mathews Burwell, the director of the Office of Management and Budget, to become Secretary of HHS. On June 5, 2014, Burwell was confirmed by the Senate in a 78–17 vote.

=== Secretary of Housing and Urban Development ===
The nomination of the Secretary of Housing and Urban Development is brought to the full Senate by the United States Senate Committee on Banking, Housing and Urban Affairs.

==== Shaun Donovan (2009–2014) ====
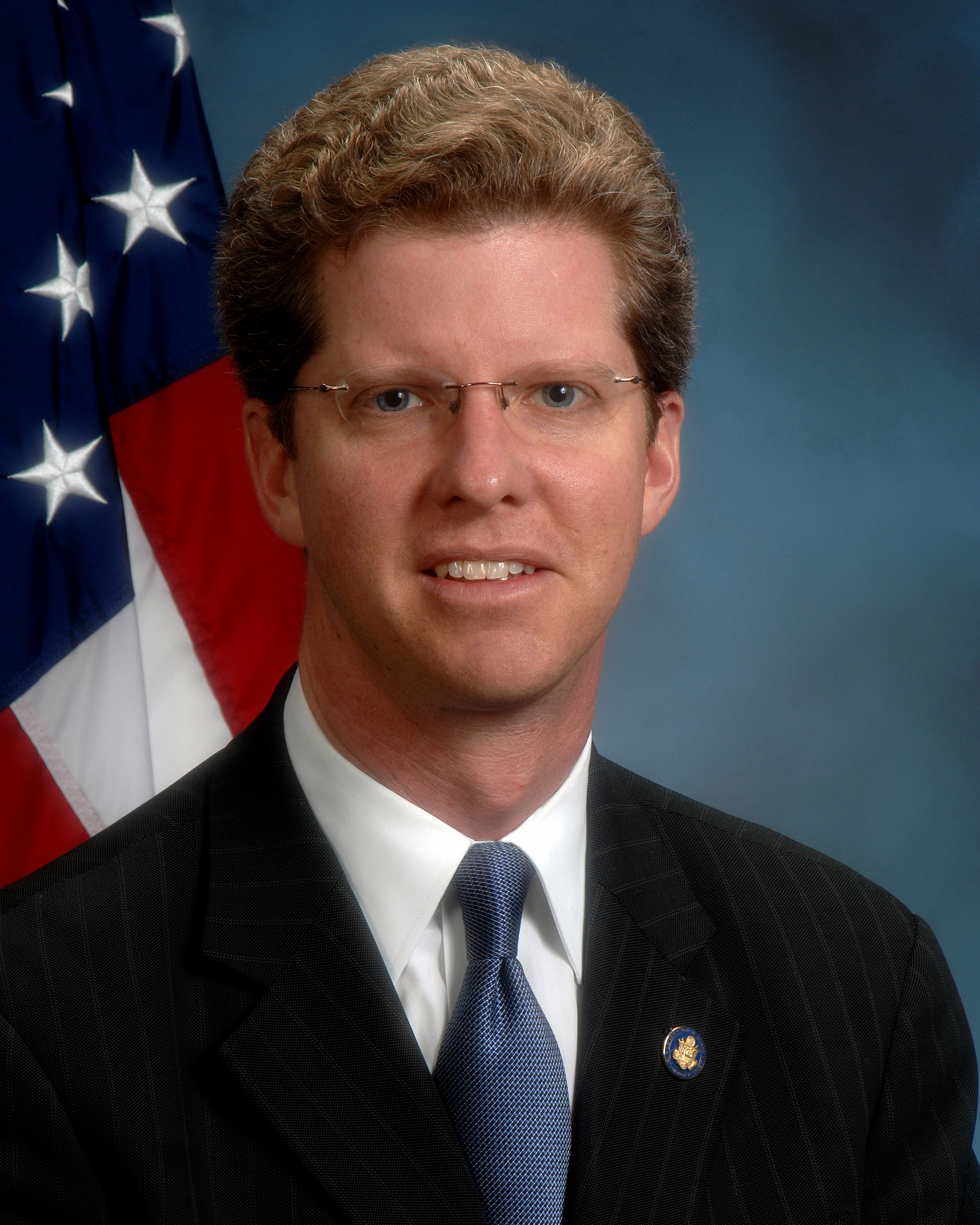
Shaun Donovan

Shaun Donovan was confirmed as Secretary of Housing and Urban Development by the U.S. Senate on January 27, 2009, by unanimous consent.

In May 2014, the resignation of Secretary Sebelius at HHS, caused a game of musical chairs, with OMB director Burwell being nominated to succeed Sebelius, which in turn on May 23, 2014, lead to the nomination of HUD Secretary Donovan to become the new director of the OMB.

==== Julian Castro (2014–2017) ====
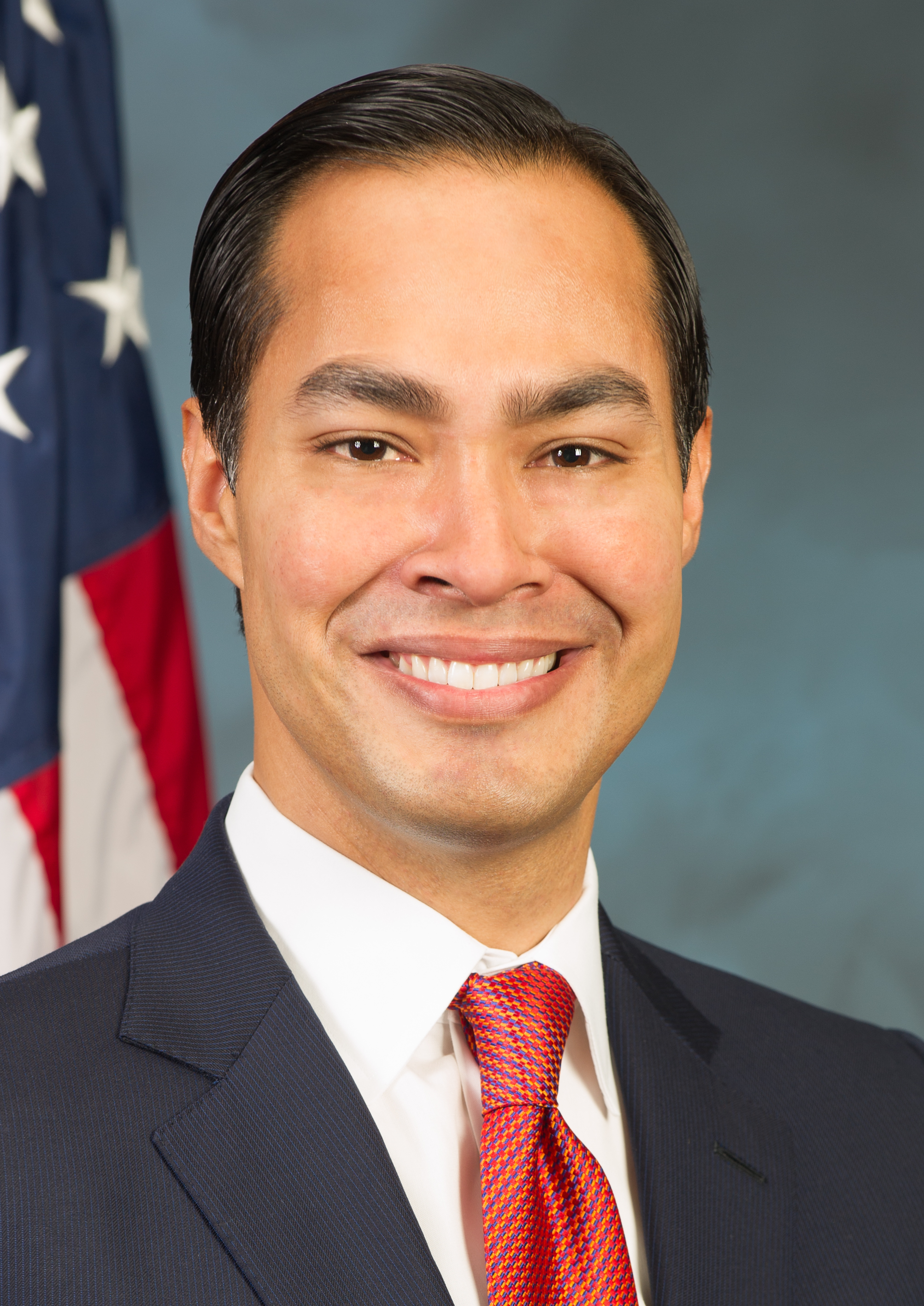
Julián Castro

After President Obama decided to nominate Secretary Donovan as the new Director of the OMB, on May 23, 2014, Obama nominated the mayor of San Antonio, Julian Castro, to become the new Secretary of Housing and Urban Development. On July 9, 2014, the Senate voted to confirm Castro by a 71–26 vote, with 18 Republicans voting in favor of the nomination.

=== Secretary of Transportation ===
The nomination of the Secretary of Transportation is brought to the full Senate by the United States Senate Committee on Commerce, Science and Transportation.

==== Ray LaHood (2009–2013) ====
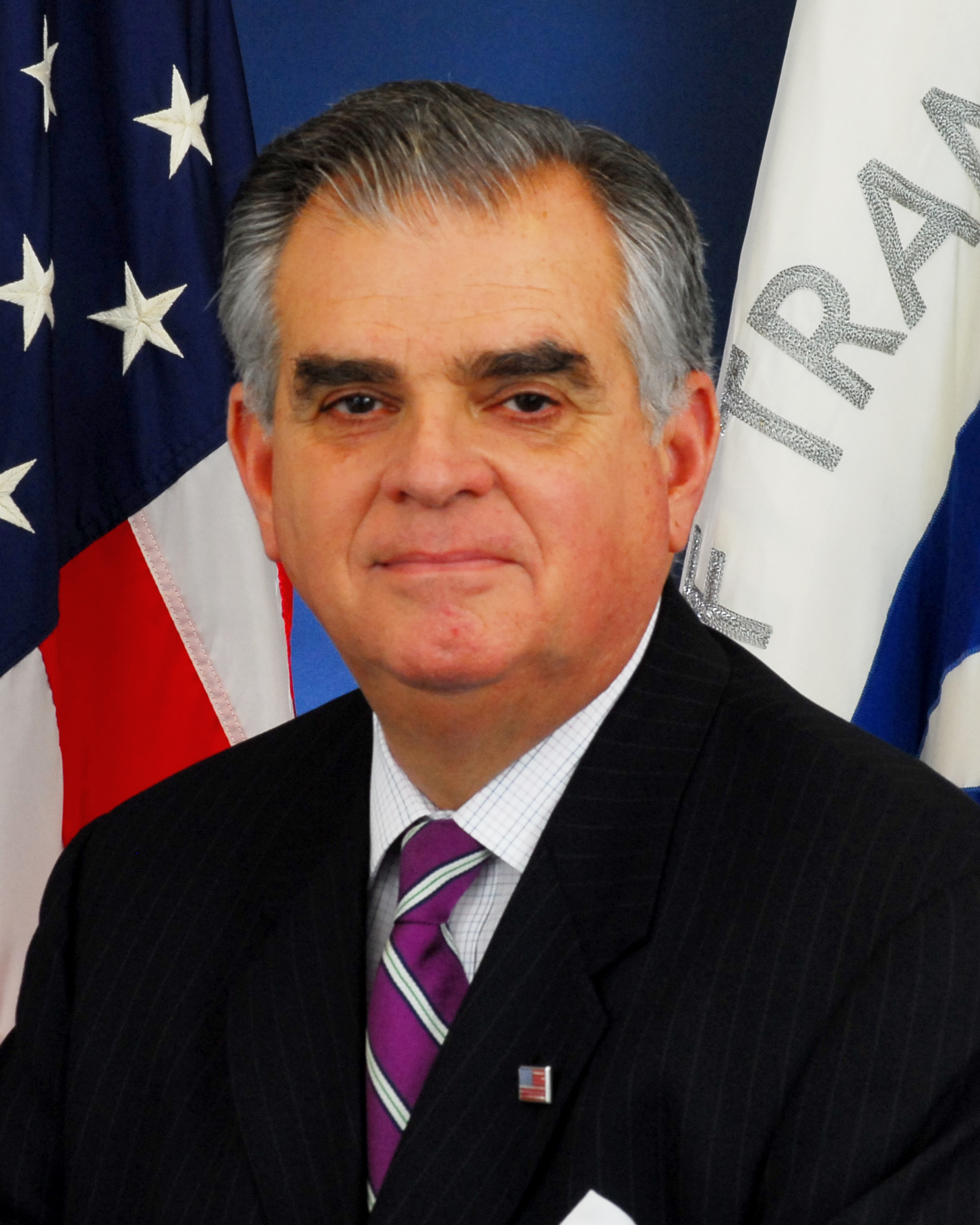
Ray LaHood

On December 19, 2008, then-President-elect Barack Obama announced that he would nominate former Republican Representative Ray LaHood to be the next Transportation Secretary. He was confirmed by a voice vote on January 23, 2009.

President Obama said of LaHood "Few understand our infrastructure challenge better than the outstanding public servant that I'm asking to lead the Department of Transportation."

LaHood's nomination was viewed with alarm among those concerned with climate change and suburban sprawl. His resume on transportation matters is seen as thin by many critics. He did not serve on the House Transportation and Infrastructure Committee at the time his selection was announced, although he had in the past. As a member of the House Appropriations Committee he did not work on transportation funding.

While picking LaHood drew praise for its bipartisan symbolism there was also a sense that LaHood's lack of expertise would diminish the department's role in 2009 major policy debates and leave him as more of a ceremonial figure. James Oberstar, the Democratic Congressman who chaired the House Transportation and Infrastructure Committee, was expected to hold more influence and will likely play a stronger leading role. Oberstar praised LaHood's "temperament" and "managerial talent," but when asked to cite an issue LaHood championed during his time on the Transportation Committee in the 1990s, Oberstar seemingly drew a blank. "I can't point to any specific legislation that he authored," he said. "He was a team player all the way through." Oberstar said LaHood would play a supporting role on tough policy calls.

On January 29, 2013, LaHood announced that he would not stay on for Obama's second term and that he would resign upon the confirmation of his successor.

==== Anthony Foxx (2013–2017) ====
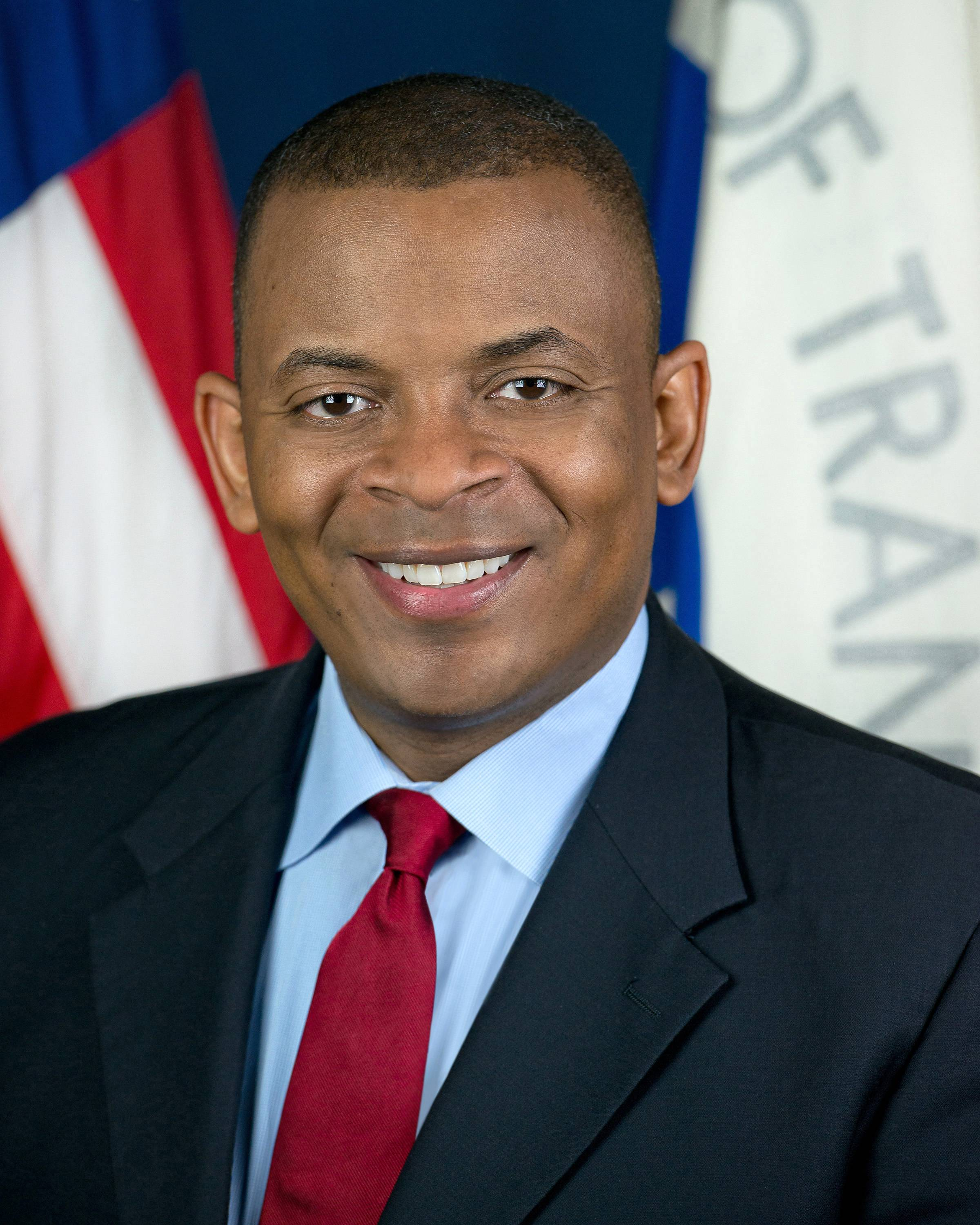
Anthony Foxx

Anthony Foxx, Mayor of Charlotte, North Carolina was nominated by President Barack Obama on April 29, 2013, to succeed Ray LaHood. On June 10, 2013, the Commerce, Science and Technology Committee unanimously approved Foxx's nomination. On June 27, 2013, Foxx was unanimously (100–0) confirmed by the U.S. Senate. Foxx was sworn in on July 2, as the 17th Secretary of Transportation.

=== Secretary of Energy ===
The nomination of the Secretary of Energy is brought to the full US Senate by the Energy and Natural Resources Committee.

==== Steven Chu (2009–2013) ====
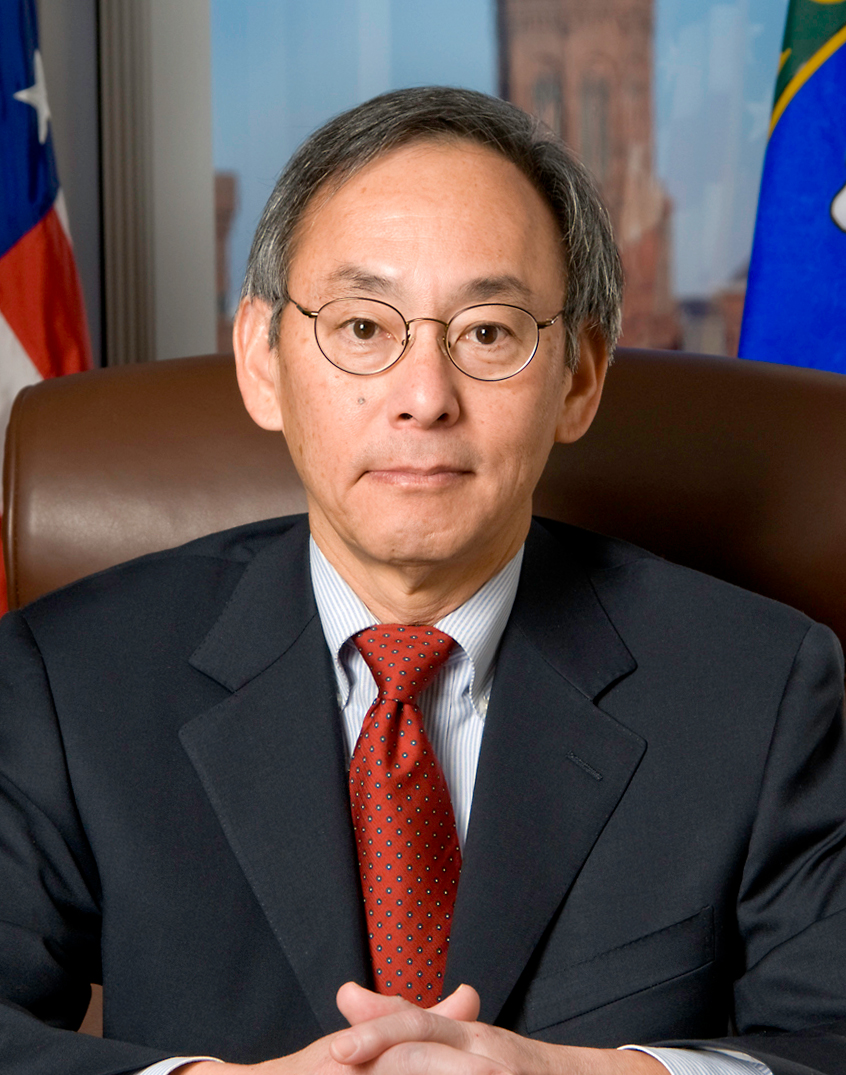
Steven Chu

Nobel Prize–winning scientist Steven Chu was unanimously confirmed by the U.S. Senate on January 20, 2009. On January 21, 2009, Chu was sworn in as Secretary of Energy in the Barack Obama administration. Chu is the first person appointed to the Cabinet after having won a Nobel Prize. He is also the second Chinese American to be a member of the Cabinet after Elaine Chao.

==== Ernest Moniz (2013–2017) ====
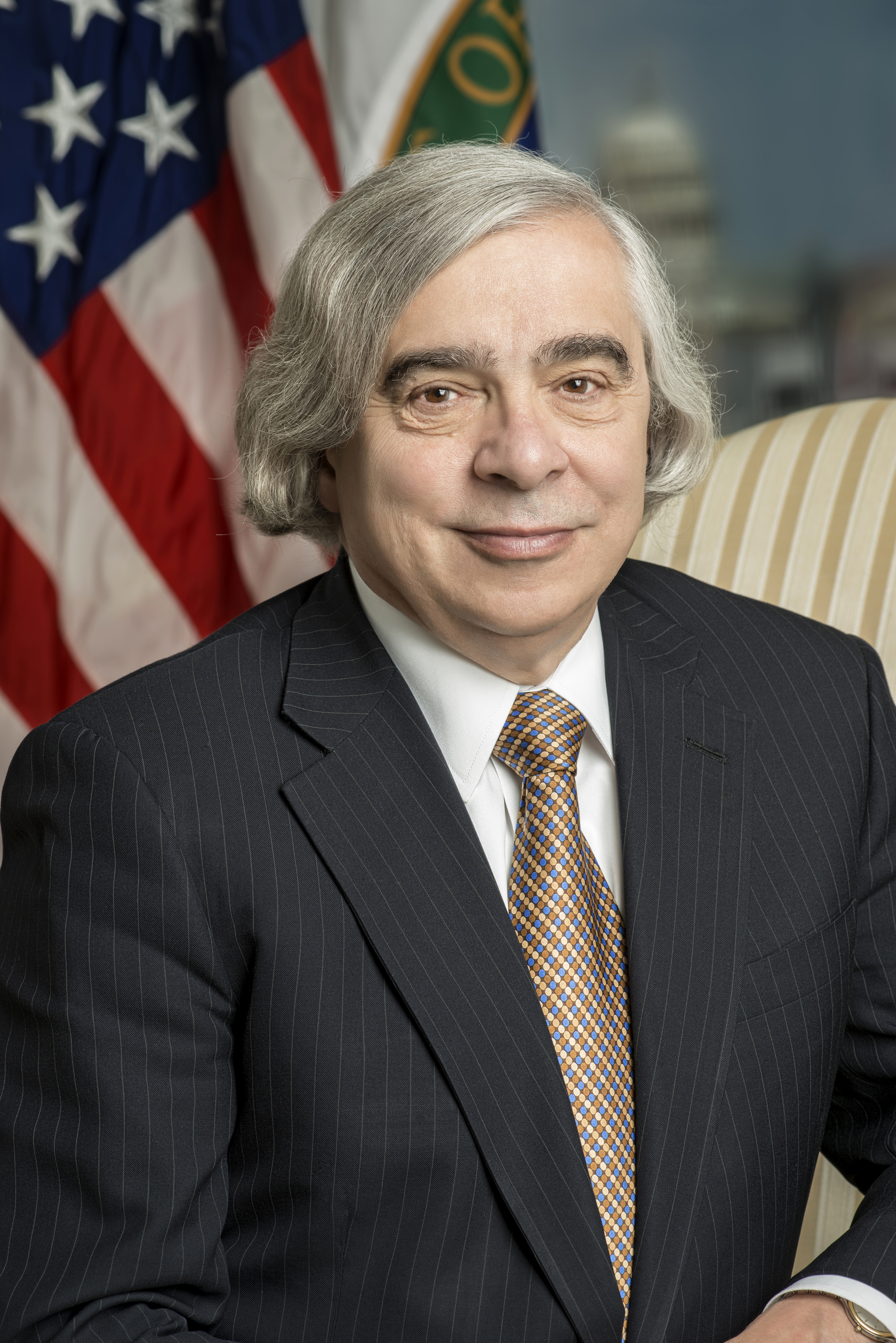
Ernest Moniz

On February 1, 2013, Secretary Chu announced his resignation pending the confirmation of a successor.

On March 4, 2013, President Obama announced he was nominating Ernest Moniz as Secretary of Energy for his second term. On April 18, 2013, the Senate Energy and Natural Resources Committee voted 21–1 to approve the nomination of Moniz. On May 16, 2013, Moniz was unanimously confirmed by the U.S. Senate.

=== Secretary of Education ===
The nomination of the Secretary of Education is brought to the full Senate through the Health, Education, Labor and Pensions Committee. Arne Duncan was confirmed as Secretary of Education on January 21, 2009, by a voice vote.

==== Arne Duncan (2009–2016) ====
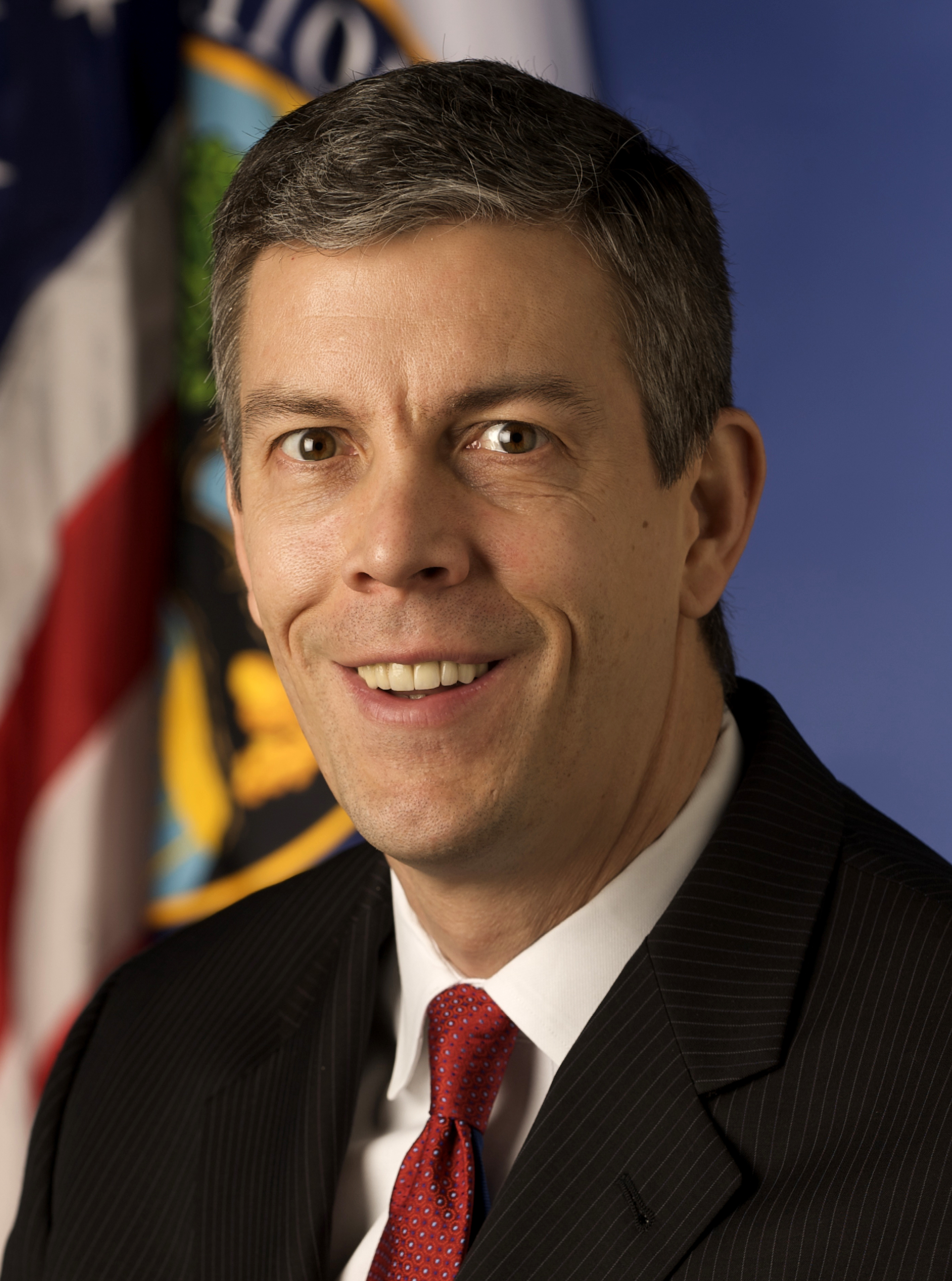
Arne Duncan

President Obama nominated Arne Duncan on December 16, 2008, to be his Secretary of Education. In a prepared statement Obama praised Duncan's skills stating "For Arne, school reform isn't just a theory in a book – it's the cause of his life. And the results aren't just about test scores or statistics, but about whether our children are developing the skills they need to compete with any worker in the world for any job."

Duncan received broad bipartisan support during his confirmation hearing in front of the Health, Education, Labor and Pensions Committee on January 13, 2009. Senator Tom Harkin (D-Iowa) said of Duncan, "there is no question that schools across America can benefit from the same kind of fresh thinking that (he) brought to Chicago public schools."

On October 2, 2015, Duncan announced he would be stepping down as Secretary at the close of 2015.

==== John King Jr. (2016–2017) ====
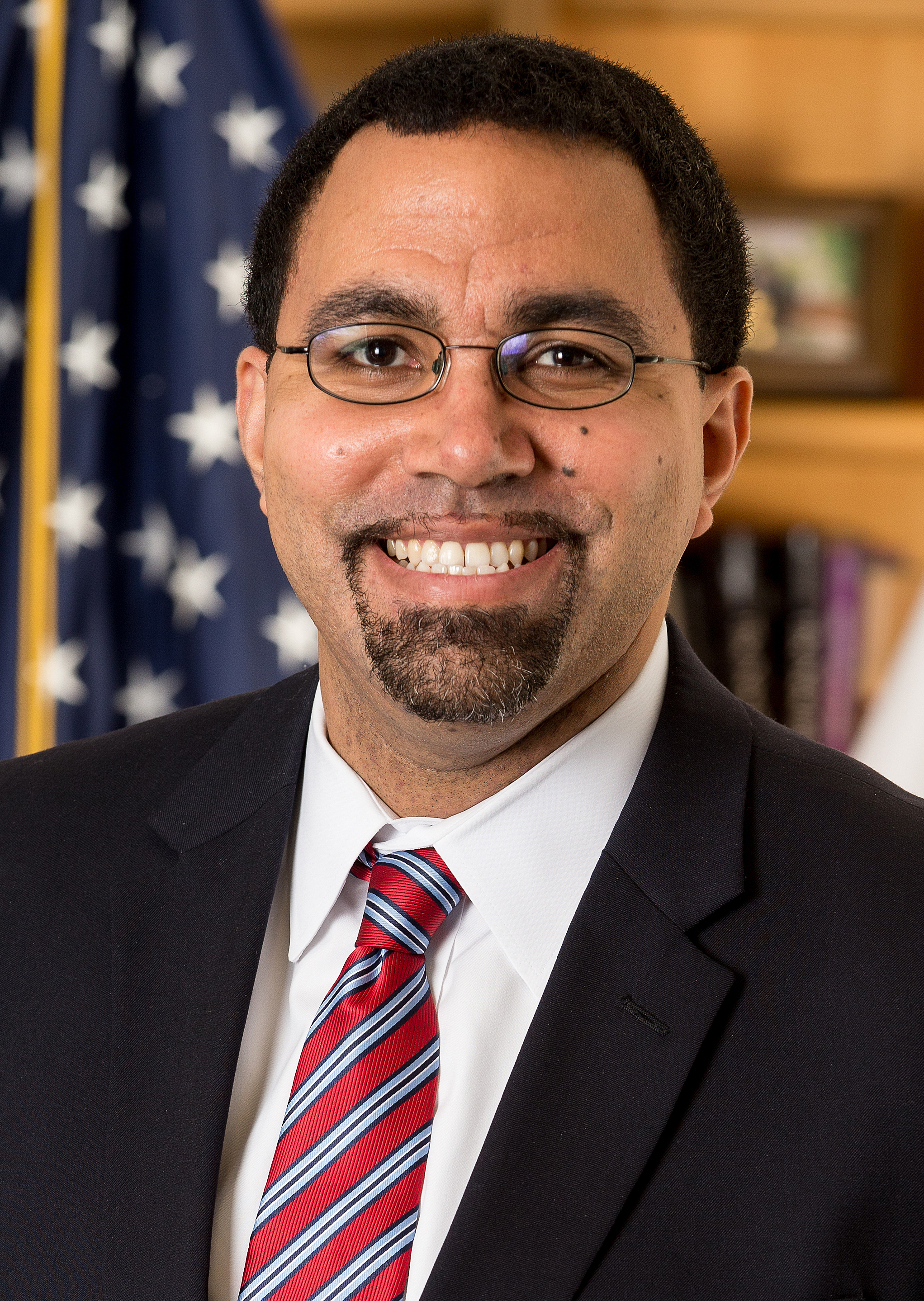
John King Jr.

Upon the announcement of Duncan's stepping down, President Obama announced his intention to nominate Deputy Secretary of Education John King Jr. as the new Secretary of Education. On March 14, 2016, King was approved to be Secretary of Education by the United States Senate after a 49–40 vote.

=== Secretary of Veterans Affairs ===
The nomination of the Secretary of Veterans Affairs is brought to the full Senate by the United States Senate Committee on Veterans Affairs.

==== Eric Shinseki (2009–2014) ====
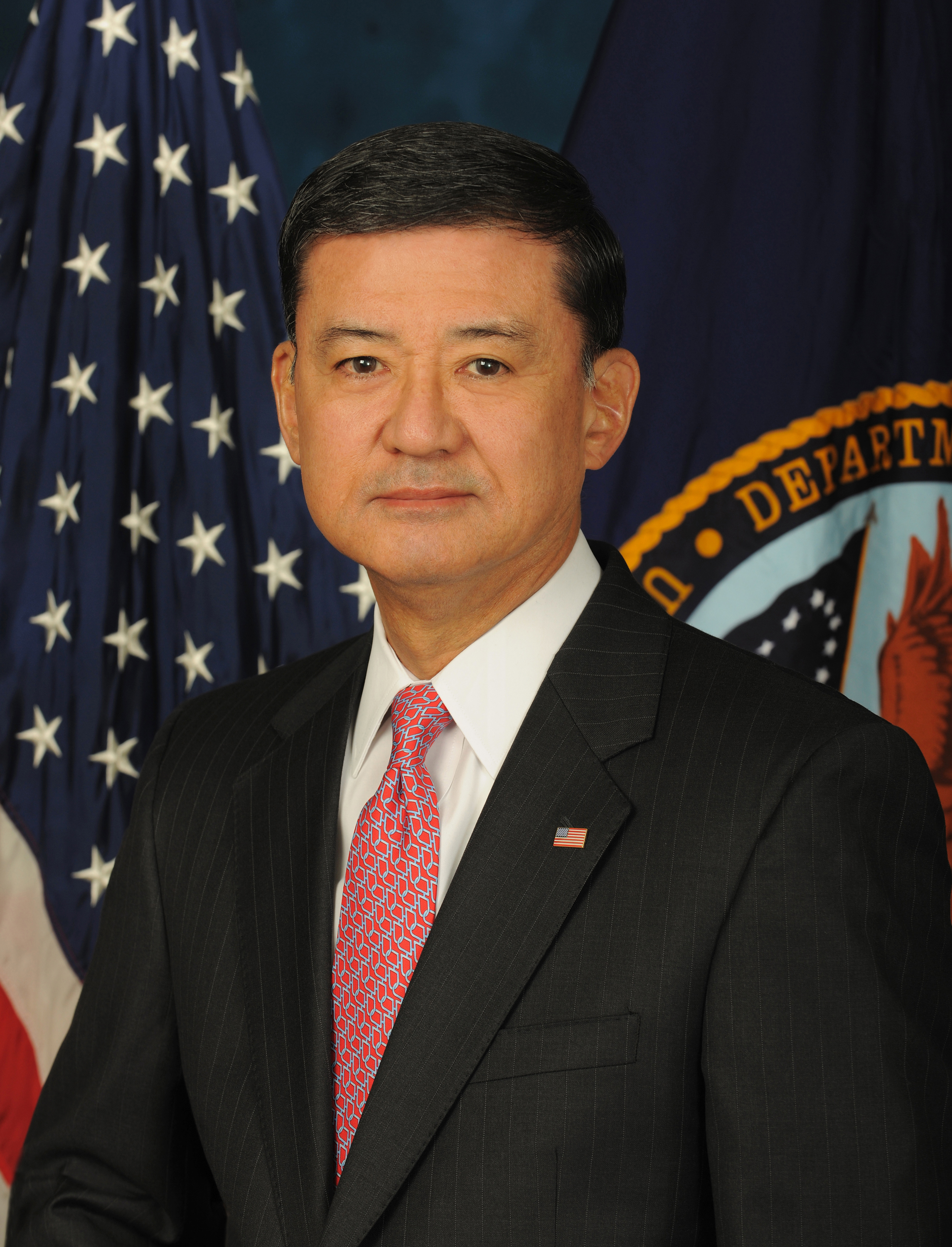
Eric Shinseki

Eric Shinseki was confirmed by the U.S. Senate on a voice vote and assumed the office of Secretary of Veterans Affairs on January 20, 2009. On May 30, 2014, President Obama announced that he had accepted Shinseki's resignation as secretary.

==== Robert McDonald (2014–2017) ====
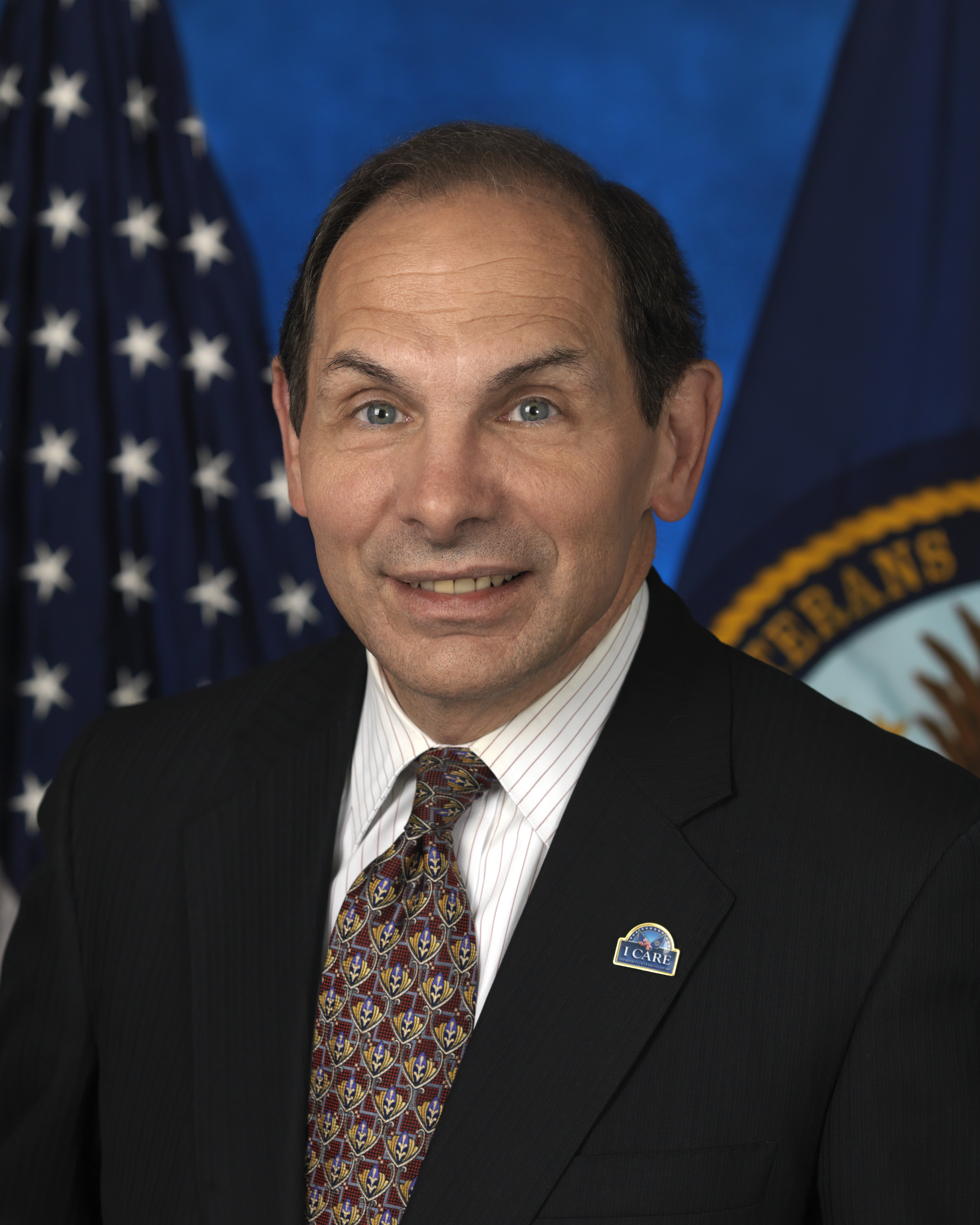
Bob McDonald

On June 29, 2014, it was reported that U.S. President Barack Obama would nominate former Procter & Gamble executive Bob McDonald to succeed General Eric Shinseki as the Secretary of Veterans Affairs. On July 23, 2014, the Senate Committee on Veterans' Affairs backed McDonald 14–0, sending his nomination to the Senate floor. On July 29, 2014, the Senate confirmed McDonald in a 97–0 vote.

=== Secretary of Homeland Security ===
The nomination of the Secretary of Homeland Security is brought to the United States Senate Committee on Homeland Security and Governmental Affairs.

==== Janet Napolitano (2009–2013) ====
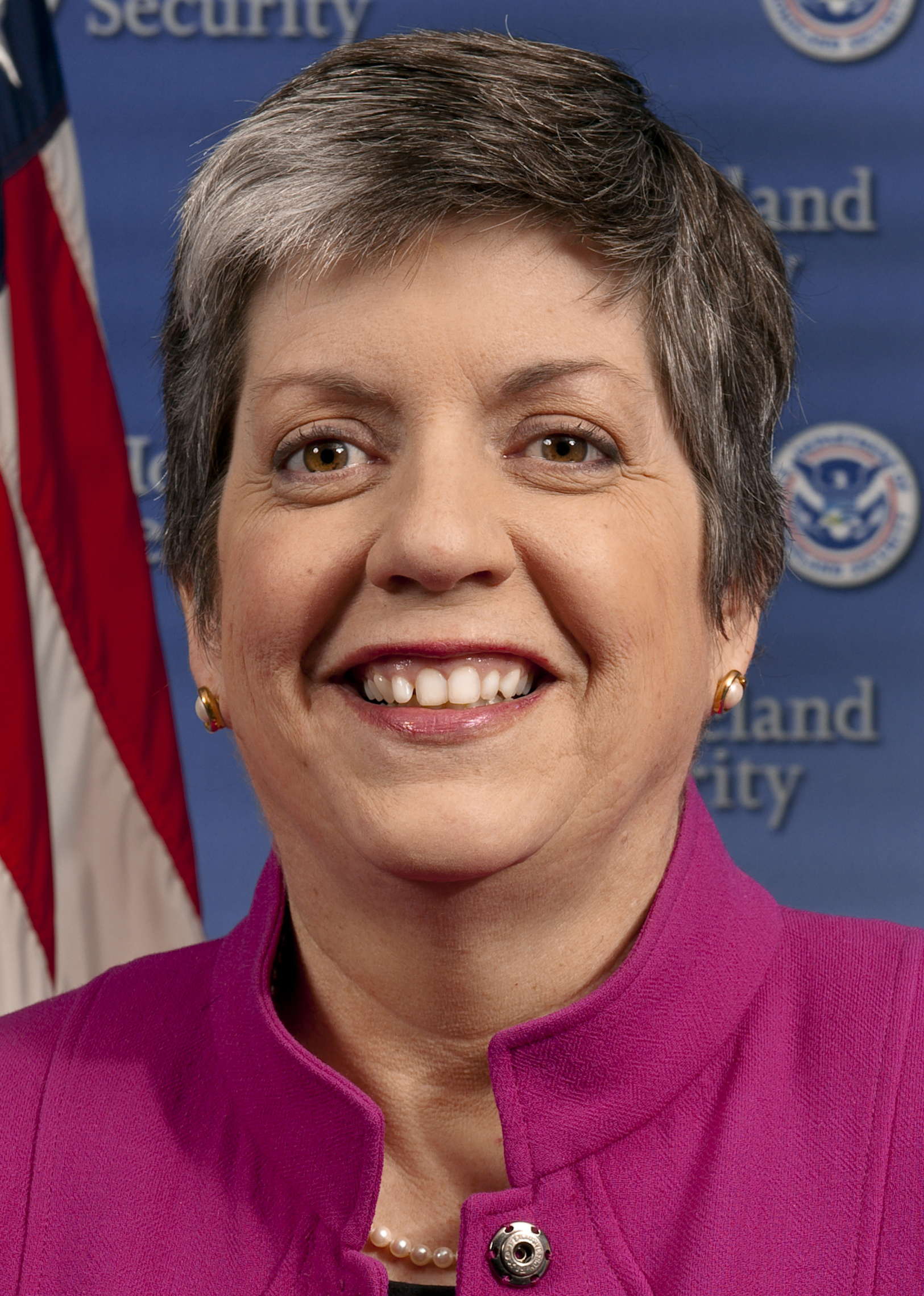
Janet Napolitano

Janet Napolitano was confirmed by the U.S. Senate on a voice vote and assumed the office of Secretary of Homeland Security on January 21, 2009.

On November 5, 2008, Napolitano was named to the advisory board of the Obama-Biden Transition Project. On December 1, 2008, Barack Obama introduced Napolitano as his nominee to head the United States Department of Homeland Security (DHS). On January 20, 2009, Napolitano was confirmed, becoming the first woman appointed Secretary in the relatively new department. Secretary of State Jan Brewer became the governor of Arizona, as the state does not have a lieutenant governor.

On July 12, 2013, Napolitano announced she was resigning to take a position as President of the University of California. Her resignation as Secretary of Homeland Security took effect on September 6, 2013, and Rand Beers served as Acting Secretary from that date until Jeh Johnson's confirmation as Secretary in December. Beers had been then-Acting Deputy Secretary and he retained his Senate-confirmation in the position immediately below, as Under Secretary of Homeland Security for National Protection and Programs; Beers left DHS on March 6, 2014, to join the White House staff.

==== Jeh Johnson (2013–2017) ====
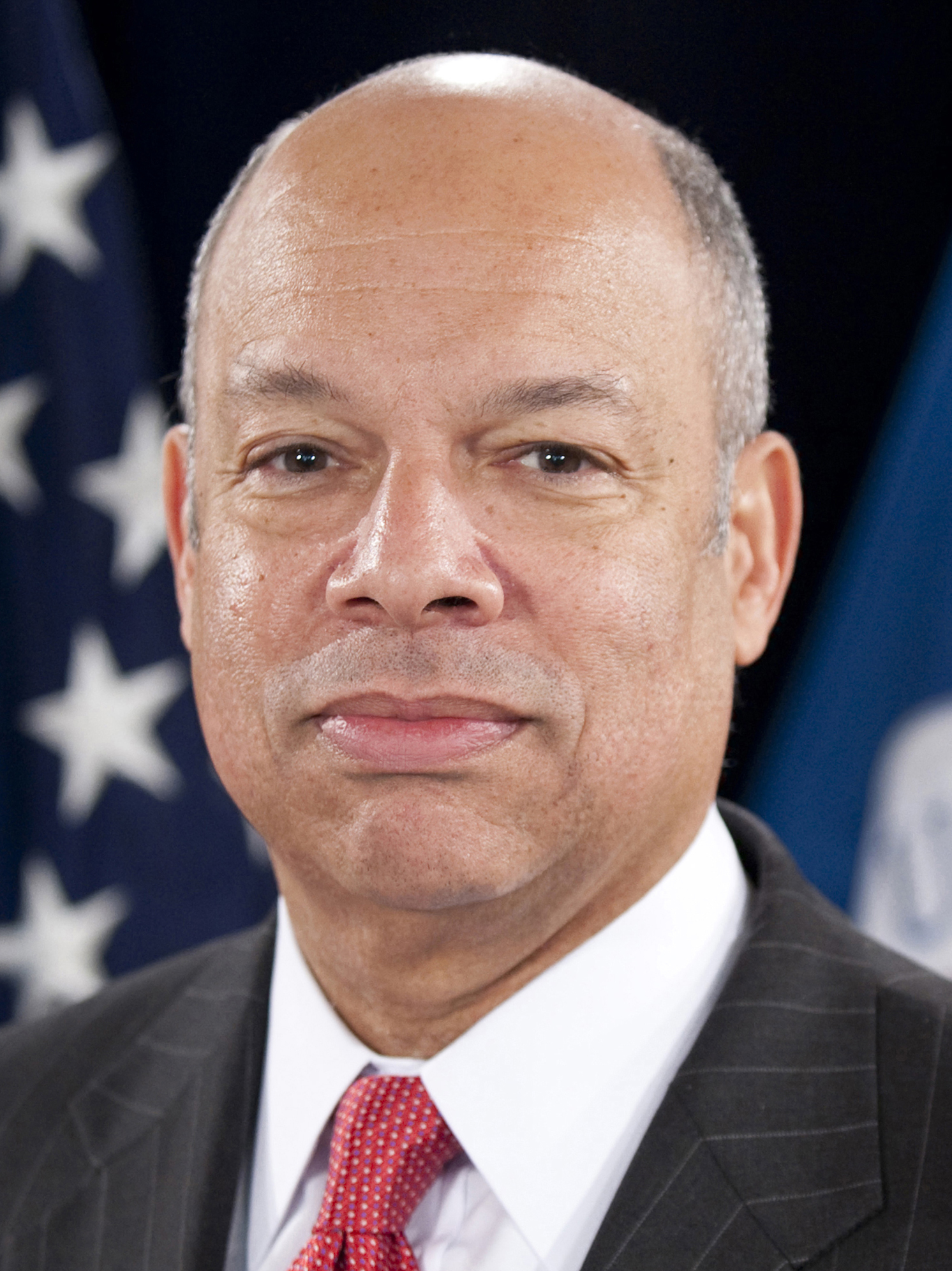
Jeh Johnson

On October 17, 2013, President Obama announced his intention to nominate former Pentagon official Jeh Johnson as Secretary of Homeland Security. On December 16, 2013, Johnson was confirmed by the Senate in a 78–16 vote.

== Nominated candidates for Cabinet-level positions ==
President Obama has included members of his cabinet that are not traditionally considered members of the Cabinet.

=== Chief of Staff ===
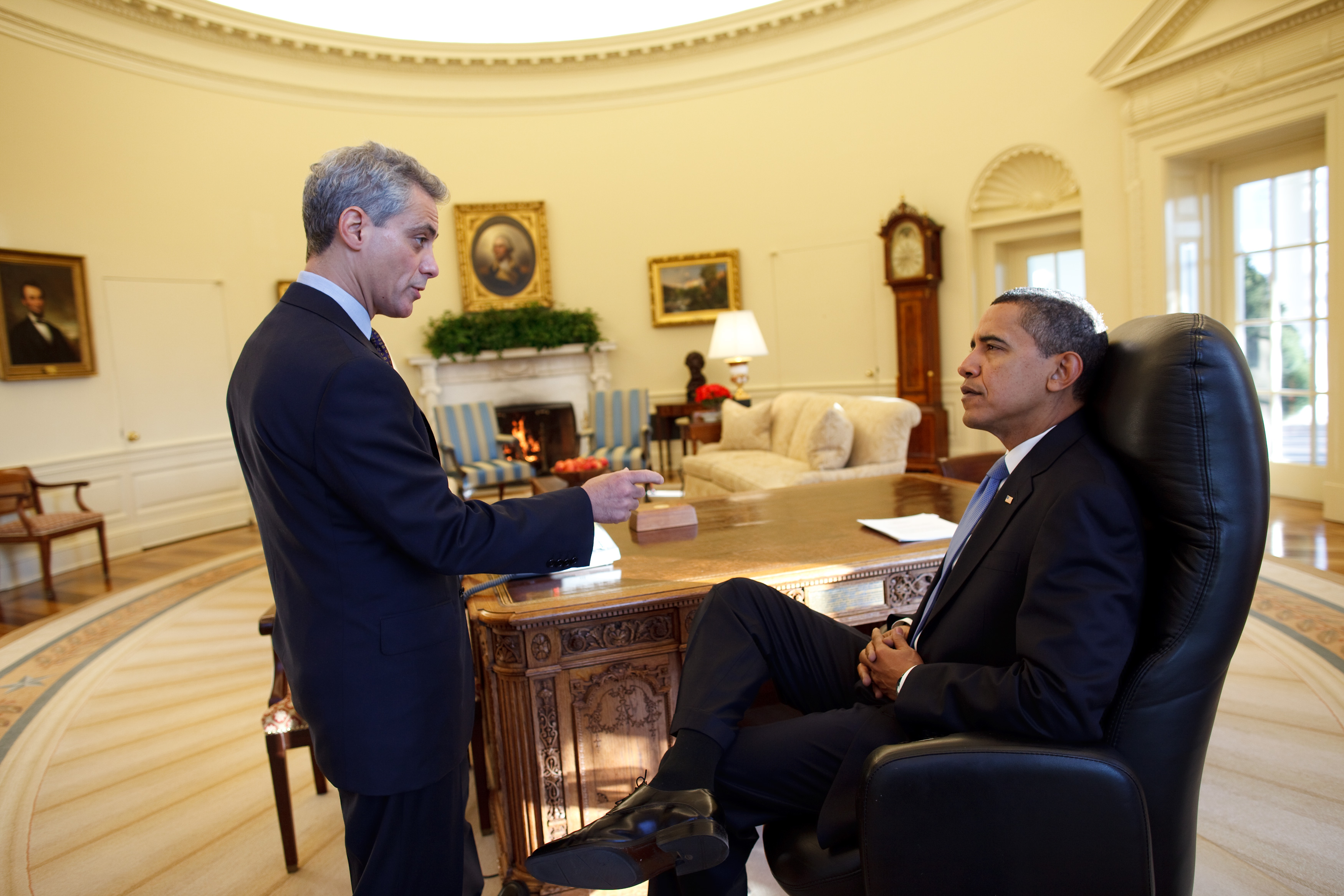
Barack Obama and Rahm Emanuel in the Oval Office

On November 6, 2008, Rahm Emanuel accepted the Cabinet-level position of White House Chief of Staff under Barack Obama. He resigned his congressional seat effective January 2, 2009. A special primary to fill his vacated congressional seat was held on March 3, 2009, and the special general election was held on April 7, 2009. Chicago newspapers reported that one candidate for that seat said at a forum that Emanuel had told him he may be interested in running for the seat again in the future.

Some Republican leaders criticized Rahm Emanuel's appointment because they believed it went against Obama's promises to make politics less divisive, given Emanuel's reputation as a partisan Democrat. Republican Lindsey Graham disagreed, saying: "This is a wise choice by President-elect Obama. He's tough but fair – honest, direct and candid."

Ira Forman, executive director of the National Jewish Democratic Council, said that the choice indicates that Obama will not listen to the wrong people regarding the U.S.–Israel relationship. Some commentators opined that Emanuel would be good for the Israeli–Palestinian peace process because if Israeli leaders make excuses for not dismantling settlements, Emanuel will be tough and pressure the Israelis to comply.

Some Palestinians and Arabs expressed dismay at Obama's appointment of Emanuel. Ali Abunimah of the Electronic Intifada said that Obama's appointment of Emanuel sent the signal he would not be taking "more balanced, more objective, more realistic advice that could change the course from the disastrous Palestine-Israel policies of the Bush and Clinton administrations." Emanuel said that Obama did not need his influence to "orientate his policy toward Israel".

Emanuel left office on October 1, 2010, to be replaced on an interim basis by Pete Rouse, and was elected Mayor of Chicago the following February. William M. Daley became White House Chief of Staff on January 13, 2011, when interim Chief Pete Rouse was made legal Counselor to the President. A year later, on January 9, 2012, Daley announced his intention to retire in favor of Jack Lew (Budget Director since November 2010). Lew took office on January 27, 2012, but he, too, left the job a year later (on January 25, 2013) when he was nominated to be Secretary of the Treasury (see above).

From January 25, 2013, until January 20, 2017, the Chief of Staff was Denis McDonough, formerly the Deputy National Security Advisor.

=== Director of the Office of the Budget ===
==== Peter Orszag (2009–2010) ====
On November 25, 2008, President-elect Barack Obama announced that Peter R. Orszag would be his nominee for director of the Office of Management and Budget, the arm of the White House responsible for crafting the federal budget and overseeing the effectiveness of federal programs. At 40, he was the youngest member of the Obama Cabinet, as the president upgraded the Director of OMB to cabinet-level priority.

==== Jack Lew (2010–2012) ====
Orszag resigned, effective from July 30, 2010. On July 13, 2010, the White House announced that Jack Lew had been chosen to replace Orszag as Director of OMB, subject to Senate confirmation. During confirmation hearings in the Senate, in response to questioning by Senator Bernie Sanders (I-VT), Lew said that he did not believe deregulation was a "proximate cause" of the 2008 financial crisis: Lew told the panel that "the problems in the financial industry preceded deregulation," and after discussing those issues, added that he didn't "personally know the extent to which deregulation drove it, but I don't believe that deregulation was the proximate cause." On November 18, 2010, Lew was confirmed by the Senate by unanimous consent. Jack Lew served from November 18, 2010 – January 27, 2012, when he resigned to become Obama's White House Chief of Staff. Following Lew's resignation, Jeffrey Zients served as Acting OMB Director until Sylvia Mathews Burwell's confirmation 15 months later.

==== Sylvia Mathews Burwell (2013–2014) ====
On March 3, 2013, it was announced that President Obama nominated Sylvia Mathews Burwell to head the OMB. On April 24, 2013, the U.S. Senate confirmed Burwell 96–0.

==== Shaun Donovan (2014–2017) ====
In May 2014, the resignation of Secretary Sebelius at HHS, caused a game of musical chairs, with OMB director Burwell being nominated to succeed Sebelius, which in turn on May 23, 2014, lead to the nomination of HUD Secretary Donovan to become the new director of the OMB. On July 10, 2014, Donovan was confirmed as Director of the OMB in a 75–22 vote.

=== Ambassador to the United Nations ===
==== Susan Rice (2009–2013) ====
On November 5, 2008, Susan Rice was named to the advisory board of the Obama-Biden Transition Project. On December 1, 2008, she was nominated by President-elect Obama to be the U.S. Ambassador to the United Nations, a position which he also upgraded to cabinet level. Rice is the second youngest and the first African American woman US Representative to the UN. Dr. Rice announced that she would have both a transition team in place in New York and in Washington, DC at the State Department to be headed by Hillary Clinton. Rice was confirmed by the Senate by voice vote on January 22, 2009.

==== Samantha Power (2013–2017) ====
On June 5, 2013, President Obama announced that he would appoint Susan Rice as National Security Advisor in succession to Tom Donilon. Rice in turn would be replaced as Ambassador to the United Nations by Samantha Power. On July 23, 2013, the Senate Foreign Relations Committee approved Power's nomination. On August 1, 2013, the Senate confirmed Power in an 87–10 vote.

=== Administrator of the Environmental Protection Agency ===
==== Lisa P. Jackson (2009–2013) ====
On December 15, 2008, President-Elect Barack Obama officially designated Lisa P. Jackson as the nominee for Administrator of the Environmental Protection Agency. She was confirmed through unanimous consent of the U.S. Senate on January 23, 2009. Jackson is the first African American to serve as EPA Administrator, along with being the fourth woman and second New Jerseyan to hold the position.

==== Gina McCarthy (2013–2017) ====
Lisa Jackson decided not to stay for Obama's second term. On March 4, 2013, President Obama announced he was nominating Gina McCarthy as EPA Administrator for his second term.

On May 9, 2013, all eight Republicans on the Senate Environment and Public Works Committee boycotted the panel in order to deny a vote on Gina McCarthy's nomination to head the EPA. On May 16, 2013, McCarthy's nomination was endorsed by the committee along party lines. The vote sends McCarthy's nomination to the Senate floor. However, Sen. Roy Blunt (R-Mo.) placed a hold on her nomination which had to be withdrawn before a floor vote occurred.

On July 18, 2013, McCarthy was confirmed as EPA administrator after senators reached a deal to avert changing the chamber's rules and which saw the Senate vote to move forward with a vote on McCarthy, with her nomination getting 69 votes to break the filibuster. The Senate ultimately confirmed McCarthy on a 59–40 vote.

=== Trade Representative ===
==== Ron Kirk (2009–2013) ====
Although there was speculation that Ron Kirk would be appointed Secretary of Transportation by President Obama, he was given the position of Trade Representative. As a supporter of the North American Free Trade Agreement, his selection has drawn concern from advocates of fair trade policies.

On January 22, 2013, Kirk announced that he would be stepping down as U.S. Trade Rep. His resignation became effective March 15, 2013.

==== Michael Froman (2013–2017) ====
On May 2, 2013, President Obama announced the nomination of deputy national security adviser for international economics Michael Froman as Trade Representative. On June 11, 2013, the Senate Finance Committee approved Froman's nomination. On June 19, 2013, Froman was confirmed by the U.S. Senate in a 93 to 4 vote.

=== Chair of the Council of Economic Advisers ===
==== Christina Romer (2009–2010) ====
On November 24, 2008, President Barack Obama designated Christina Romer as Chair of the Council of Economic Advisers upon the start of his administration.

After her nomination and before the Obama administration took office, Romer was tasked with co-authoring the administration's plan to recover from the 2008 recession. With economist Jared Bernstein, Romer co-authored Obama's plan for economic recovery.

In a video presentation, she discussed details of the job-creation package that the Obama administration submitted to Congress.

==== Austan Goolsbee (2010–2011) ====
Romer resigned in September 2010 to return to positions in academia.

Austan Goolsbee was designated chair of the Council on September 10, 2010, succeeding Christina Romer.

On June 6, 2011, Goolsbee announced that he would return to the University of Chicago, claiming that the economy was "a million miles from where it started". He was expected to play an informal role from Chicago in Obama's 2012 campaign. Goolsbee's resignation became effective August 5, 2011.

==== Alan Krueger (2011–2013) ====
On August 29, 2011, Alan Krueger was nominated by Obama to be chairman of the White House Council of Economic Advisers, and on November 3, 2011, the Senate unanimously confirmed his nomination.

==== Jason Furman (2013–2017) ====
As Krueger had to return to Princeton University in the fall of 2013 or face the prospect of losing tenure, he chose to resign as chair. On June 10, 2013, Jason Furman was named by President Barack Obama as Chairman of the Council of Economic Advisors (CEA). On August 1, 2013, the Senate confirmed Furman.

=== Administrator of the Small Business Administration ===
==== Karen Mills (2009–2013) ====
Karen Mills was nominated by President-elect Barack Obama on December 19, 2008, confirmed unanimously by the Senate on April 2, 2009, and sworn in on April 6, 2009. During her tenure, in 2012 her office was elevated to the rank of Cabinet-level officer, expanding her power on policy decisions and granting her access to cabinet meetings.

On February 11, 2013, Mills announced her resignation as Administrator of the SBA.

==== Maria Contreras-Sweet (2014–2017) ====
On January 15, 2014, Maria Contreras-Sweet was nominated by President Barack Obama to join his Cabinet as head of the Small Business Administration. Contreras-Sweet was confirmed as the Administrator of the Small Business Administration by voice vote on March 27, 2014. She assumed role of her position as Administrator of the Small Business Administration on April 7, 2014.

== Formerly Cabinet-level ==
=== Director of the Office of National Drug Control Policy ===
On February 11, 2009, it was reported that Gil Kerlikowske had accepted an offer by President Obama to become Director of the Office of National Drug Control Policy, succeeding John P. Walters. On May 7, 2009, the Senate confirmed Kerlikowske's nomination by a vote of 91–1. However, prior to Kerlikowske's nomination, the position was downgraded from a Cabinet-level position to a non-Cabinet-level position.

== See also ==
- First inauguration of Barack Obama
- Second inauguration of Barack Obama
- Presidential transition of Barack Obama
