= First 100 days of the Obama presidency =

Period from January to April 2009

- Part of the presidency of Barack Obama
- Date: January 20, 2009 – April 30, 2009

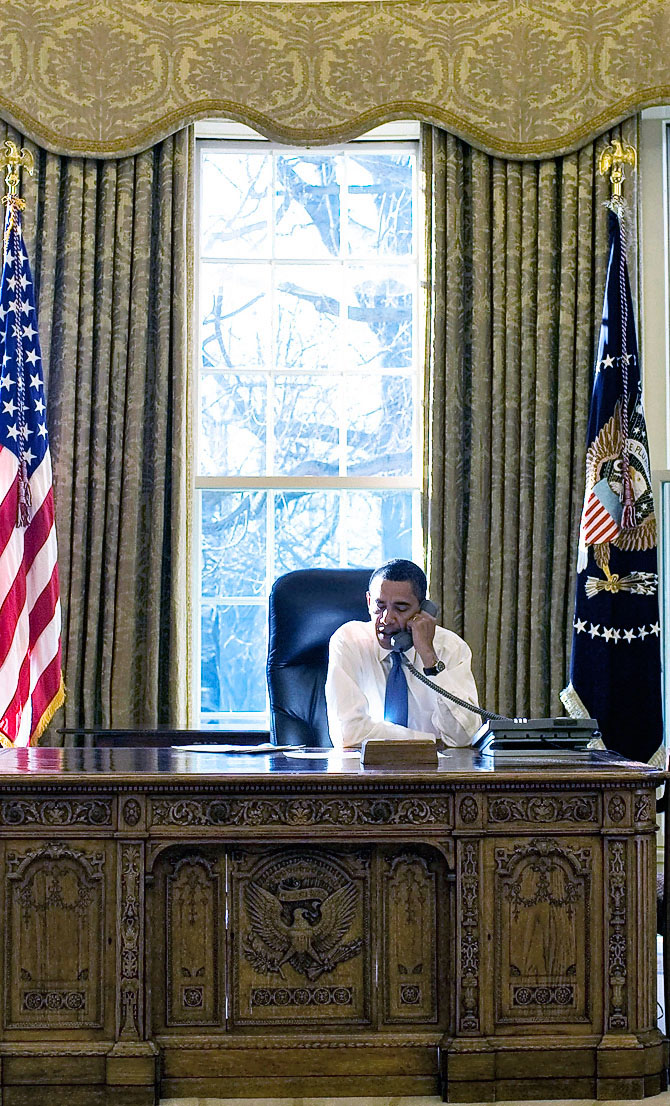
Barack Obama at his desk in the Oval Office of the White House, on Jan. 21, 2009. This was Obama's first full day as president.

The first 100 days of the Obama presidency began on January 20, 2009, the day Barack Obama was inaugurated as the 44th president of the United States. The first 100 days of a presidency took on symbolic significance during Franklin D. Roosevelt's first term in office, and the period is considered a benchmark to measure the early success of a president. The 100th day of Obama's presidency was April 30, 2009. He stated that he should not be judged just by his first hundred days: "The first hundred days is going to be important, but it's probably going to be the first thousand days that makes the difference." Obama began to formally create his presidential footprint during his first 100 days, attempting to foster support for his economic stimulus package, the American Recovery and Reinvestment Act of 2009. The bill passed in the House on January 28, 2009, by a 244–188 vote, then passed in the Senate on February 10 by a 61–37 margin.

Obama's accomplishments during the first 100 days included signing into law both the Lilly Ledbetter Fair Pay Act of 2009, which relaxed the statute of limitations for equal-pay lawsuits, as well as the expanded State Children's Health Insurance Program (S-CHIP); winning approval of a congressional budget resolution that put Congress on record as dedicated to dealing with major health care reform legislation in 2009; implementing new ethics guidelines designed to significantly curtail the influence of lobbyists on the executive branch; breaking from the Bush administration on a number of policy fronts, except for Iraq, in which he followed through on Bush's withdrawal of U.S. troops; supporting the UN declaration on sexual orientation and gender identity; and lifting the 7½-year ban on federal funding for embryonic stem cell research. Obama also ordered the closure of the Guantanamo Bay detention camp in Cuba, though this was ultimately unsuccessful. He later lifted some monetary and travel-related restrictions to the island.

At the end of the first 100 days, 65% of Americans approved of how Obama was doing and 29% disapproved. According to Gallup's First quarter survey in April, President Obama received a 63% approval rating. Gallup began tracking presidential approval ratings of the first quarters since Dwight Eisenhower in 1953. President John F. Kennedy received the highest in April 1961 with a 74% rating. Obama's 63% is the fourth highest and the highest since President Jimmy Carter with a 69%. President Ronald Reagan's first quarter had 60% approval in 1981, President George H. W. Bush with 57% in 1989, President Bill Clinton with 55% in 1993, and President George W. Bush with 58% in 2001.

== Historical background ==
During the Great Depression, Franklin D. Roosevelt promised drastic initiatives within his first 100 days. The New Deal legislation he got passed set a standard of action that subsequent presidents have been measured against. Although it has less significance, some analysts even make comparisons of the performances of presidents during their first 100 days of the second term.

Obama and previous presidents have made statements that downplayed the significance of their first 100 days. John F. Kennedy once said his mission might never be accomplished: "All this will not be finished in the first hundred days. Nor will it be finished in the first thousand days, nor in the life of this administration, nor even perhaps in our lifetime on this planet. But let us begin."

Obama's first 100 days were highly anticipated after he became the apparent presumptive nominee. In his first 60 Minutes post-election interview Obama said that he had been studying Roosevelt's first 100 days. Understanding the significance and symbolism of the first 100 days, Hillary Clinton's campaign strategy included mapping out a first 100 days plan.

While Obama began preparation for his first 100 days during the presidential transition following his election, he stated that America only has one president at a time, especially for issues related to international affairs. During the first hundred days in office presidents are highly scrutinised and heading into the period Obama's intention was to attempt to execute several plans that are going to be watched closely.

== Media coverage ==
Despite his attempt to downplay its significance, Obama's first 100 days were highly anticipated ever since he became the presumptive nominee. Several news outlets, such as Fox News and CBS News, even created special portals dedicated to covering the subject. Commentators particularly weighed in on challenges and priorities within the fields of domestic and foreign policy, on economic issues, and on the environment. CNN listed a number of economic issues which "Obama and his team [would] have to tackle in their first 100 days", foremost among which was implementing a recovery package to deal with the 2008 financial crisis. Even MSNBC.com, which didn't use portals, acknowledged the notability of Obama's first 100 days by including it in the titles of its stories. On Obama's first day in office, BBC World Service released the results of an opinion poll of more than 17,000 people in 17 countries; it showed that 67% anticipated Obama would strengthen U.S. relations abroad, and 80% of Italians and Germans believed U.S. relations with the rest of the world would improve under Obama.

Clive Stafford Smith, a British human rights lawyer, expressed hopes that Obama would close Guantanamo Bay detention camp within the time period. In addition, there were speculations in Jakarta that he might return to his former home city within the first 100 days after presidential aides announced his intention to hold a major foreign policy speech in the capital of an Islamic country.

The New York Times devoted a five-day series, which was spread out over two weeks, to anticipatory analysis of Obama's first hundred days. Each day a political expert's analysis was followed by freely edited blog postings from readers. The writers compared Obama's prospects with the situations of Franklin D. Roosevelt (January 16 and February 2, Jean Edward Smith), John F. Kennedy (January 19 and February 10, Richard Reeves), Lyndon B. Johnson (January 23, Robert Dallek), Ronald Reagan (January 27, Lou Cannon), and Richard Nixon (February 4, Roger Morris).

Even political advocacy groups such as Amnesty International planned special strategies to leverage the strategic and political significance of the first 100 days; the group organized a 100 Days Campaign for human rights.

== Inauguration ==
Barack Obama's Inauguration
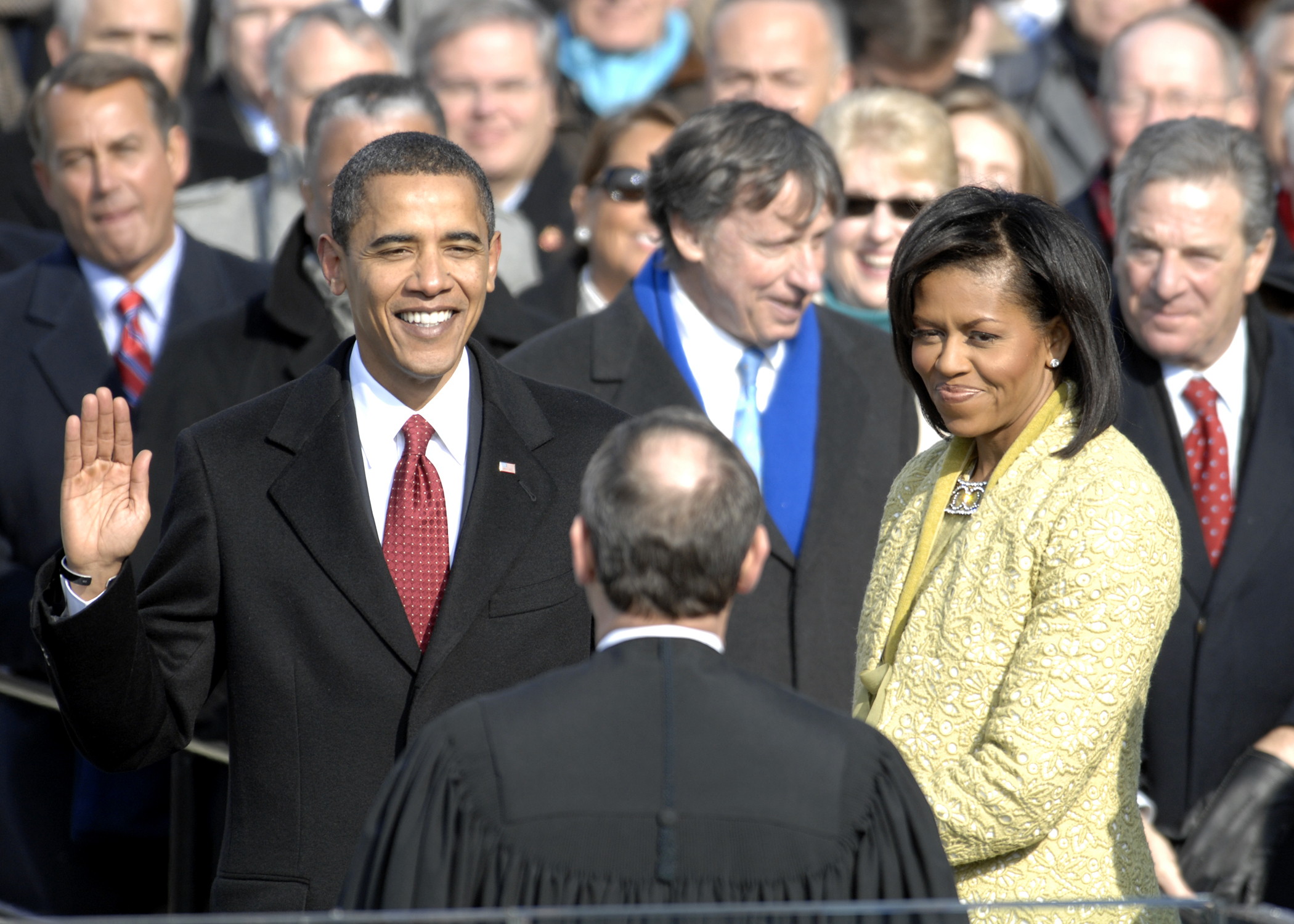
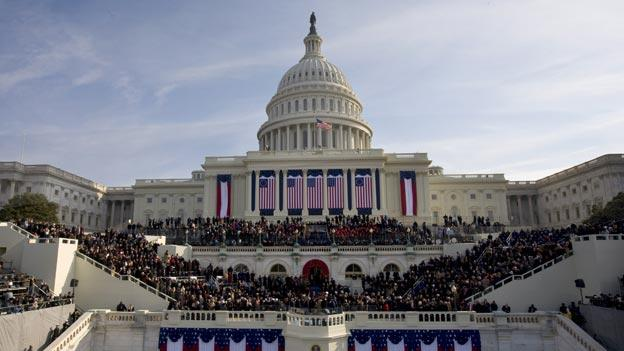
Barack Obama was inaugurated at the United States Capitol on January 20, 2009.

The first 100 days of the Presidency of Barack Obama began during the inauguration of Barack Obama with the conversion of Whitehouse.gov from the Bush Administration version to the Obama Administration version at 12:00 pm on January 20, 2009. This was only the second presidential online portal transition. At 12:01, White House Director of New Media Macon Phillips posted the website's first blog post with themes of "communication", "transparency" and "participation".

=== Oath of Office ===
Presidential Oath of Office
"Video of the Oath of Office" (0:39)
Barack Obama takes the oath of office, administered by Chief Justice John G. Roberts.

"Presidential Oath of Office (audio)"
Audio-only version

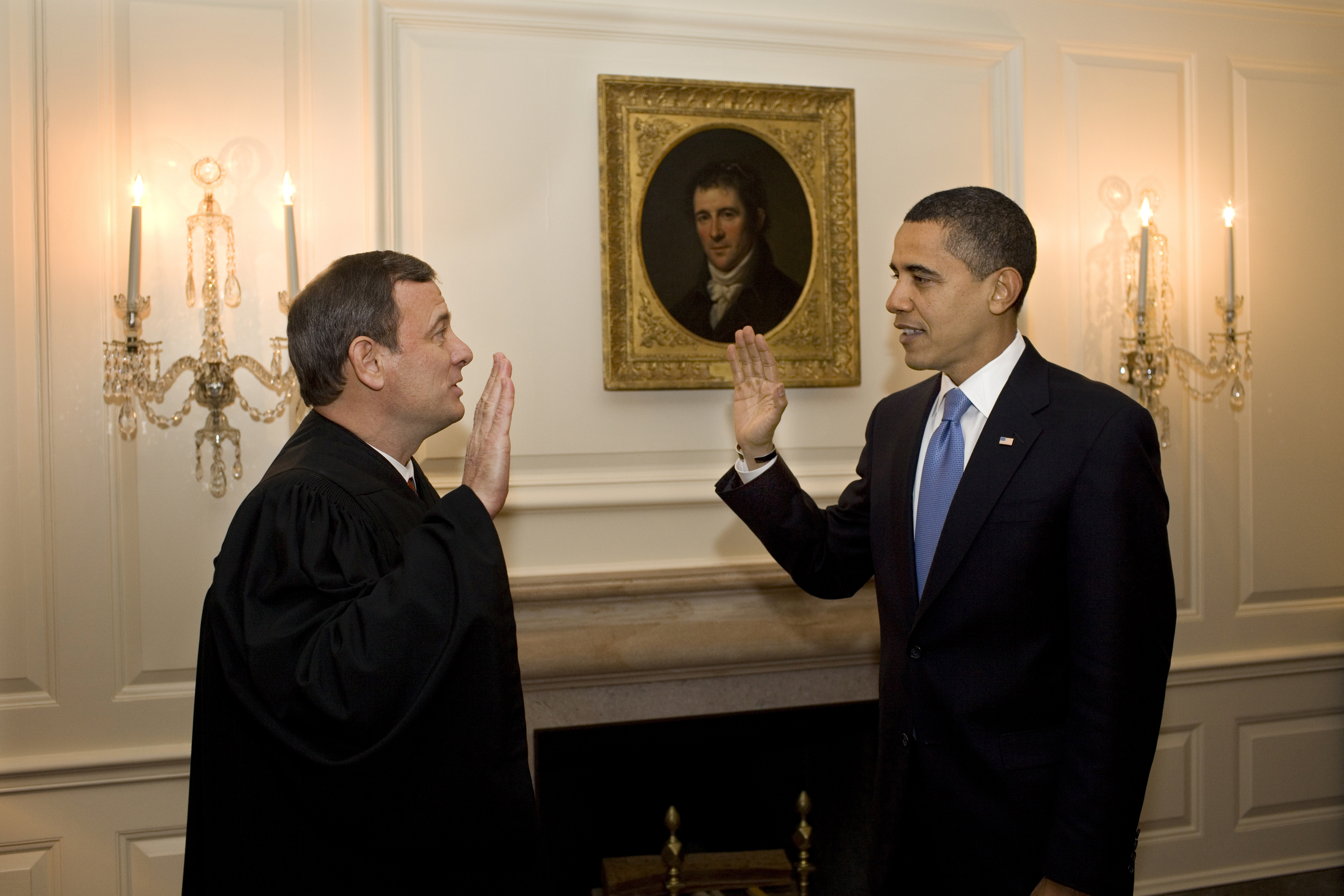
Obama retaking the oath of office on January 21, 2009

Retaking the Presidential Oath of Office
"President Obama Re-Takes Oath"
Re-administering the Presidential Oath, January 21, 2009

Article 2, Section 1, Clause 8 of the Constitution states: "Before he enter on the Execution of his Office, he shall take the following Oath or Affirmation:" Then, Article Two of the United States Constitution sets out the language that should be used in the oath of office of the president of the United States: "I do solemnly swear (or affirm) that I will faithfully execute the Office of President of the United States, and will to the best of my ability, preserve, protect and defend the Constitution of the United States." The Vice President also has an oath of office, but it is not mandated by the Constitution and is prescribed by statute.

During the inauguration, there were two matters of controversy. First, although Obama constitutionally assumed the Presidency at 12:00 pm on January 20, he did not complete the oath of office until 12:05 pm. Clinton also completed the oath about five minutes late during his first inauguration. Additionally, Obama and the administering official, Chief Justice of the United States John G. Roberts, did not execute the 35-word oath as prescribed by the United States Constitution. First, Obama jumped in before the "do solemnly swear" phrase, which seemed to throw the Chief Justice off his stride. Subsequently, Roberts moved the word "faithfully" back nine spots, and used "to" instead of "of." That threw the president off, and he smiled and paused to collect his thoughts, then decided to follow Roberts' lead. The flaw is recorded in the transcript of the oath as follows:

Roberts: I, Barack Hussein Obama …
Obama: I, Barack …
Roberts: … do solemnly swear …
Obama: I, Barack Hussein Obama, do solemnly swear …
Roberts: … that I will execute the office of president to the United States faithfully …
Obama: … that I will execute …
Roberts: … the off – faithfully the pres – the office of president of the United States …
Obama (at the same time): … the office of president of the United States faithfully …

According to the Twentieth Amendment to the United States Constitution, Section 1: "The terms of the President and Vice President shall end at noon on the 20th day of January". Thus, Bush had relinquished the Presidency at 12:00. According to the Twentieth Amendment to the United States Constitution, Section 3: If, at the time fixed for the beginning of the term of the President,... if the President elect shall have failed to qualify, then the Vice President elect shall act as President until a President shall have qualified." By Article Two, Section 1, Clause 8 of the Constitution and Amendment 20, Some feel that Obama was not able to assume the Presidency until 12:05. In fact, since Biden did not complete his oath until 12:01, there was further speculation as to who was President for the first minute after Bush relinquished control.

Several political and constitutional law experts questioned whether Obama was officially the president since he had not correctly performed the constitutional duty of the Oath. The following day at about 7:35 pm the White House, Roberts re-administered the oath in an act that White House Counsel Greg Craig described as stemming from "an abundance of caution," to quell any concerns that the President may not have been properly sworn in. Both Calvin Coolidge and Chester Arthur retook the oath under similar circumstances.

== Administration and Cabinet ==
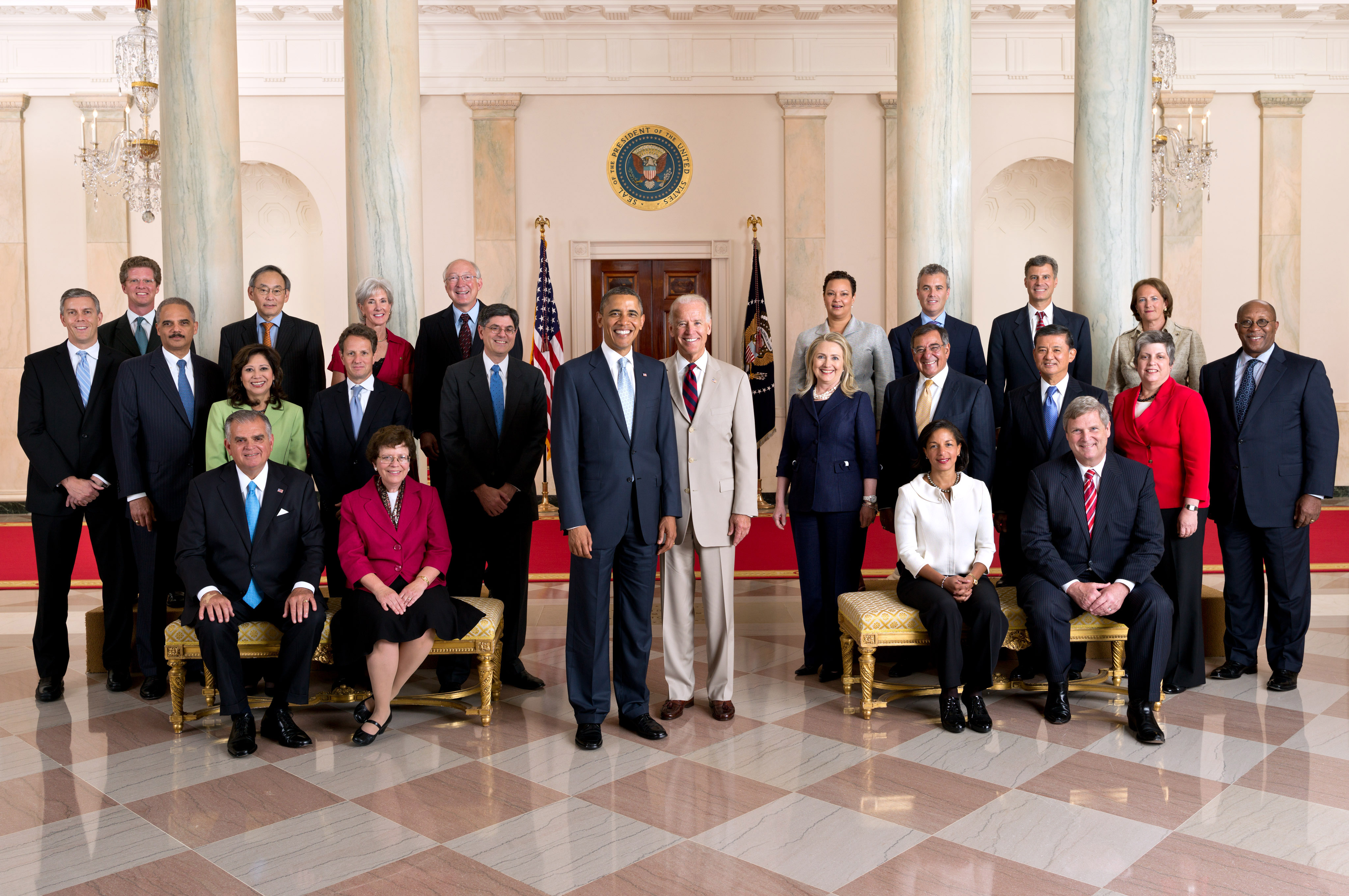

Obama cabinet
Office	Name	Term
President	Barack Obama	2009–2017
Vice President	Joe Biden	2009–2017
Secretary of State	Hillary Clinton	2009–2013
John Kerry	2013–2017
Secretary of the Treasury	Timothy Geithner	2009–2013
Jack Lew	2013–2017
Secretary of Defense	Robert Gates*	2006–2011
Leon Panetta	2011–2013
Chuck Hagel	2013–2015
Ash Carter	2015–2017
Attorney General	Eric Holder	2009–2015
Loretta Lynch	2015–2017
Secretary of the Interior	Ken Salazar	2009–2013
Sally Jewell	2013–2017
Secretary of Agriculture	Tom Vilsack	2009–2017
Secretary of Commerce	Gary Locke	2009–2011
John Bryson	2011–2012
Penny Pritzker	2013–2017
Secretary of Labor	Hilda Solis	2009–2013
Tom Perez	2013–2017
Secretary of Health and Human Services	Kathleen Sebelius	2009–2014
Sylvia Mathews Burwell	2014–2017
Secretary of Housing and Urban Development	Shaun Donovan	2009–2014
Julian Castro	2014–2017
Secretary of Transportation	Ray LaHood	2009–2013
Anthony Foxx	2013–2017
Secretary of Energy	Steven Chu	2009–2013
Ernest Moniz	2013–2017
Secretary of Education	Arne Duncan	2009–2016
John King Jr.	2016–2017
Secretary of Veterans Affairs	Eric Shinseki	2009–2014
Bob McDonald	2014–2017
Secretary of Homeland Security	Janet Napolitano	2009–2013
Jeh Johnson	2013–2017
Administrator of the Environmental Protection Agency	Lisa Jackson	2009–2013
Gina McCarthy	2013–2017
Director of the Office of Management and Budget	Peter Orszag	2009–2010
Jack Lew	2010–2012
Sylvia Mathews Burwell	2013–2014
Shaun Donovan	2014–2017
United States Trade Representative	Ron Kirk	2009–2013
Michael Froman	2013–2017
Ambassador to the United Nations	Susan Rice	2009–2013
Samantha Power	2013–2017
Chair of the Council of Economic Advisers	Christina Romer	2009–2010
Austan Goolsbee	2010–2011
Alan Krueger	2011–2013
Jason Furman	2013–2017
Administrator of the Small Business Administration	Karen Mills**	2009–2013
Maria Contreras-Sweet	2014–2017
White House Chief of Staff	Rahm Emanuel	2009–2010
William M. Daley	2011–2012
Jack Lew	2012–2013
Denis McDonough	2013–2017
- *Retained from previous administration **Elevated to cabinet-level in January 2012

Twenty-two members of the Obama administration are either in the United States Cabinet (15) or are in positions considered to be Cabinet-level (7) and must be confirmed by the current Senate. The members of the Cabinet are the heads of the fifteen major departments (State, Defense, Justice, etc.), and the seven cabinet-level positions are the Vice President, White House Chief of Staff, Administrator of the Environmental Protection Agency, Director of the Office of Management and Budget, U.S. Trade Representative, Ambassador to the United Nations, and Director of the Office of National Drug Control Policy. Since Robert Gates was a member of the previous administration, his letter of resignation (a formality at the end of a President's term) was simply not accepted, and he did not need confirmation. On January 19, 2009, Senate Democratic leaders requested fifteen of the twenty-two positions to be ratified by unanimous consent, and seven gained unanimous confirmation by voice vote the next day: Ken Salazar, Steven Chu, Arne Duncan, Peter Orszag, Eric Shinseki, Tom Vilsack, and Janet Napolitano. On January 21, Obama presided over the swearing in of the seven unanimous nominees. Later that day, the Senate confirmed Hillary Clinton by a 94–2 vote. On January 22, several more confirmations were approved unanimously: Susan E. Rice, Ray LaHood, Lisa P. Jackson, and Shaun Donovan. On January 26, the Senate confirmed Timothy Geithner by a 60–34 margin, and Holder was confirmed on February 2 by a 75–21 margin. Of the 31 nominations that Obama has made to senior posts only 17 were approved in January.

Unanimous Cabinet Confirmations
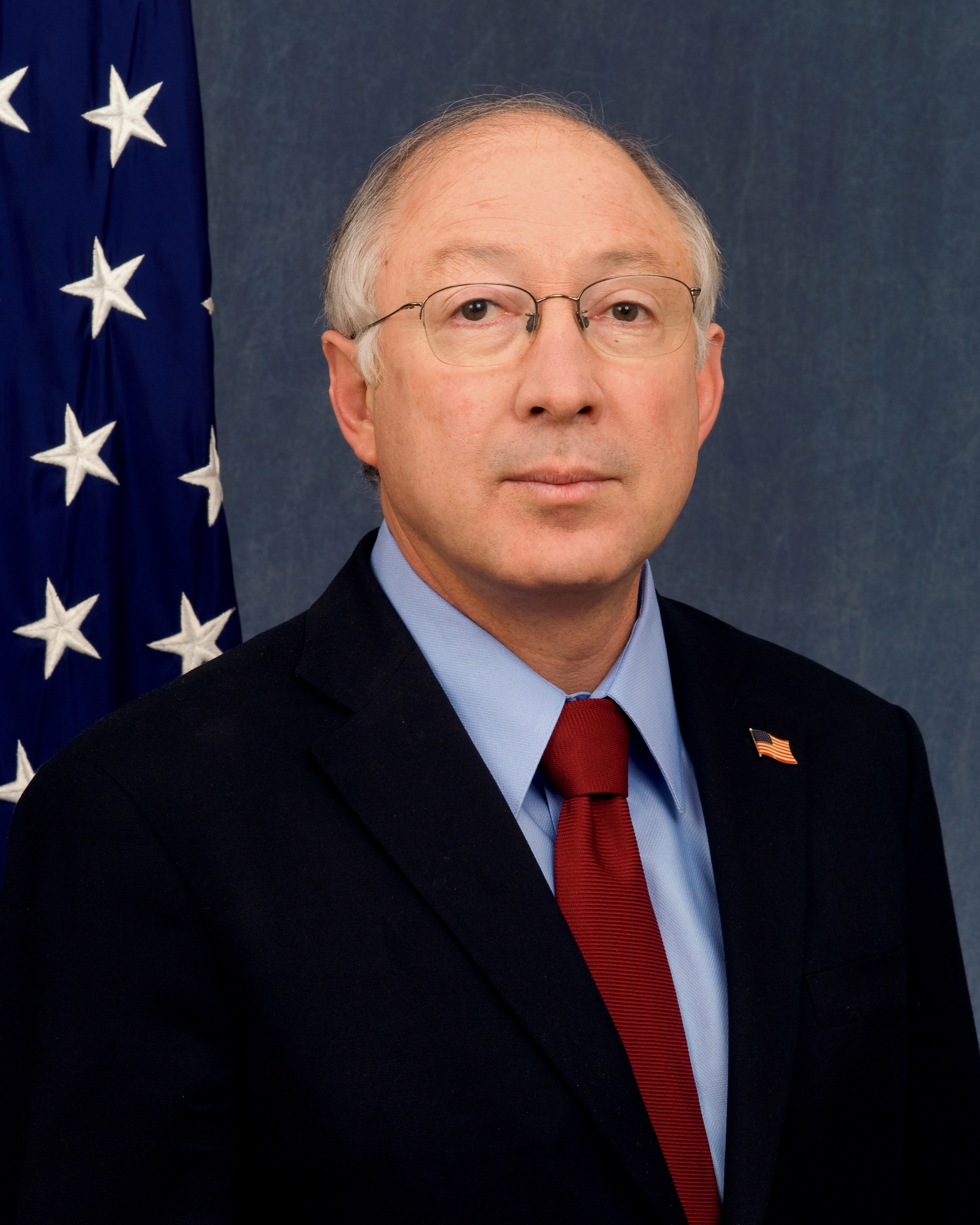
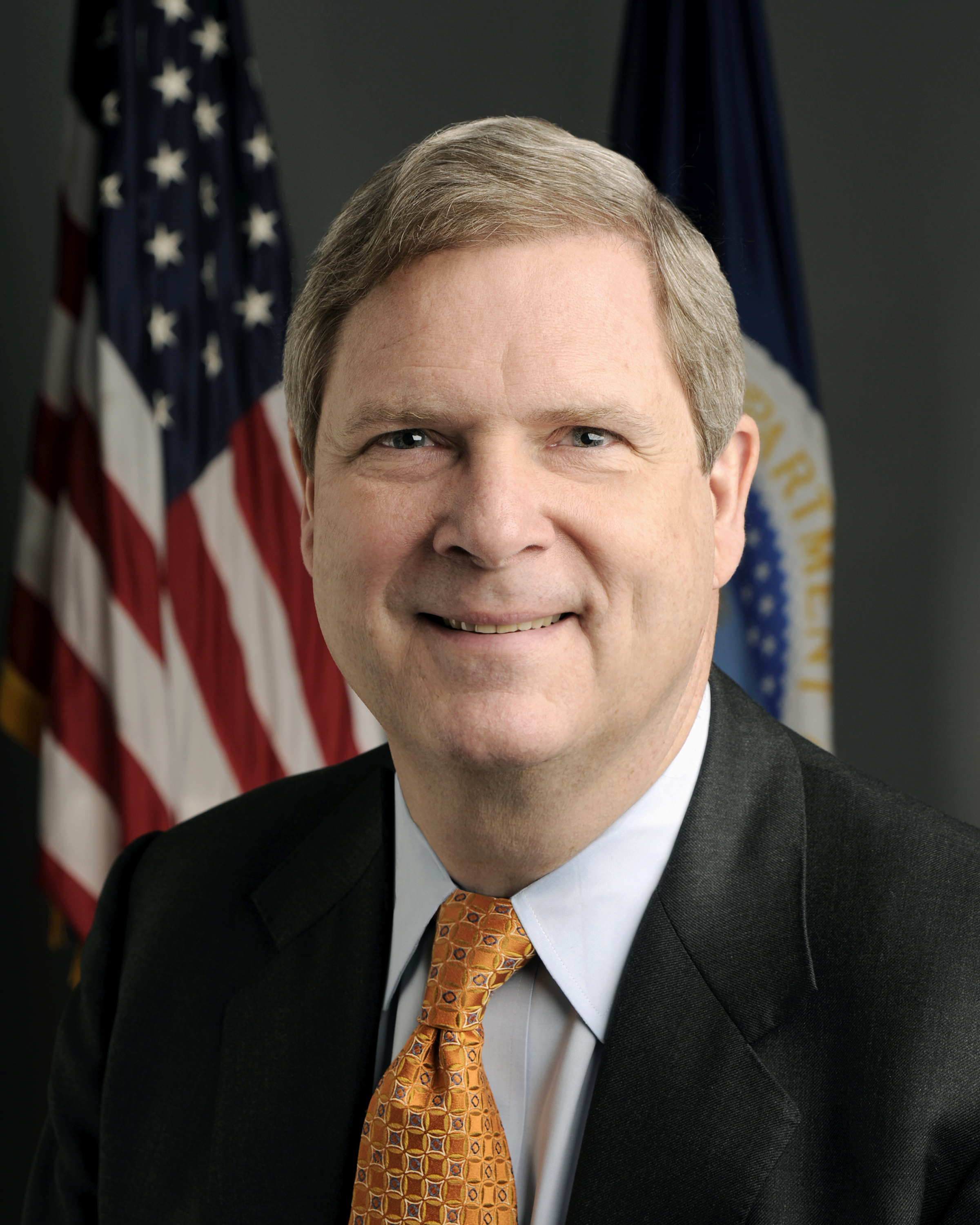
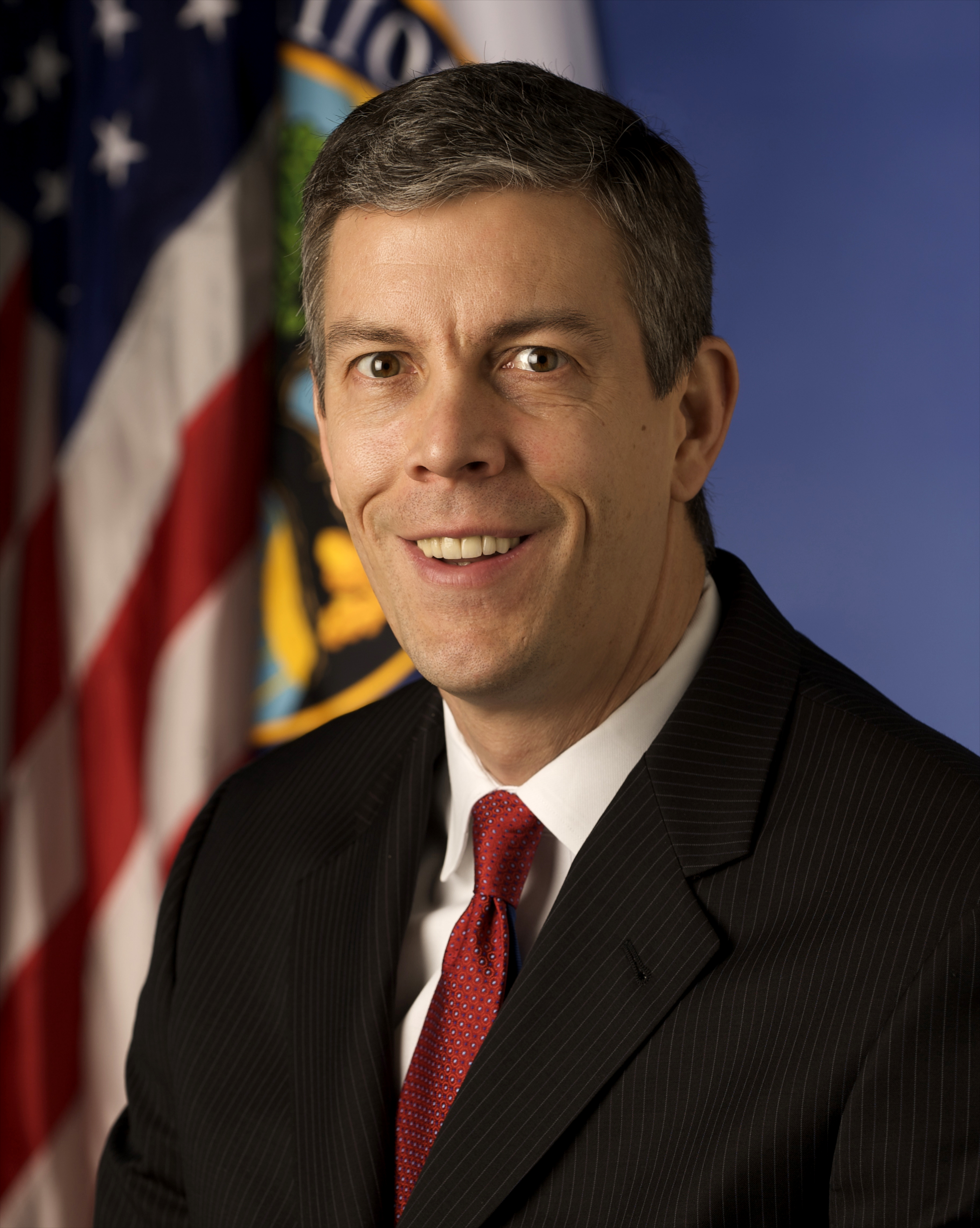
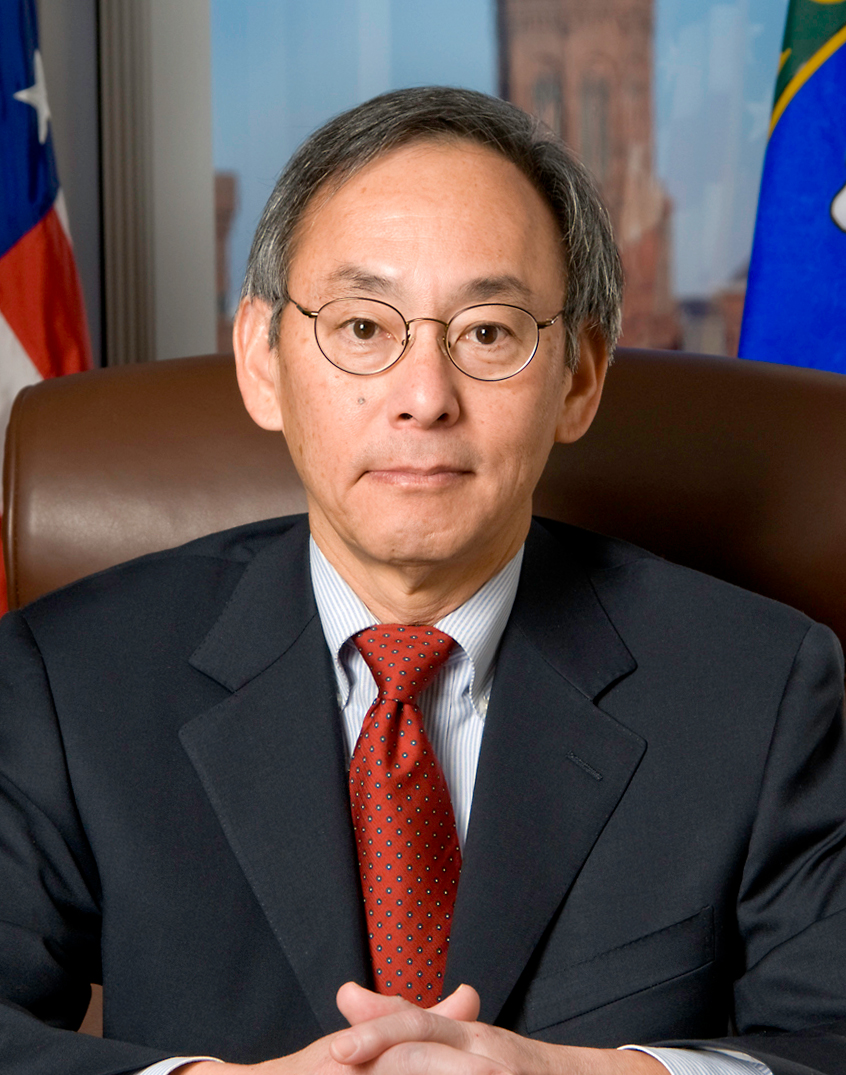
Left to right: Salazar, Vilsack, Duncan, and Chu were unanimous Inauguration Day confirmations.

At the conclusion of Obama's first week as President, Hilda Solis, Tom Daschle, Ron Kirk, and Eric Holder had yet to be confirmed, and there had been no second appointment for Secretary of Commerce. Republicans were also delaying Solis's confirmation due to a perceived lack of transparency. Holder was later confirmed by a vote of 75–21 on February 2, and on February 3, Obama announced Senator Judd Gregg as his second nomination for Secretary of Commerce, since Bill Richardson had withdrawn amid a grand jury investigation into a state contract awarded to his political donors. Daschle withdrew later that day amid controversy over his failure to pay income taxes and potential conflicts of interest related to the speaking fees he accepted from health care interests. On February 12, Judd Gregg withdrew his nomination as Secretary of Commerce, citing "irresolvable conflicts" with President Obama and his staff over how to conduct the 2010 census and the American Recovery and Reinvestment Act of 2009. On February 24, Solis was confirmed by an 80–17 vote.

The same day rumours abounded that former Democratic two-term Washington governor Gary Locke would be named as the third Obama Commerce Secretary nominee. Locke was formally nominated on February 26, and was confirmed on March 24 by voice vote.

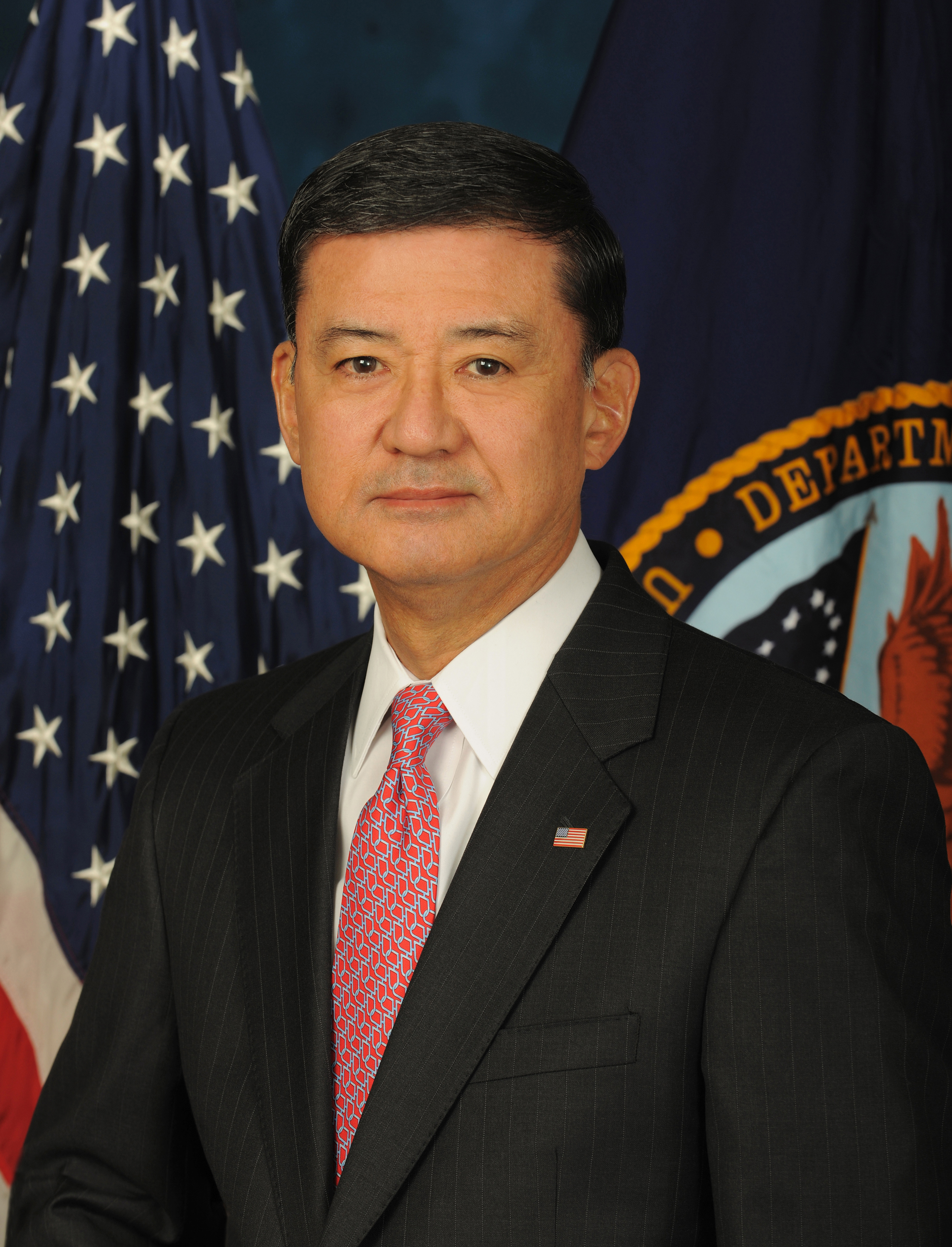
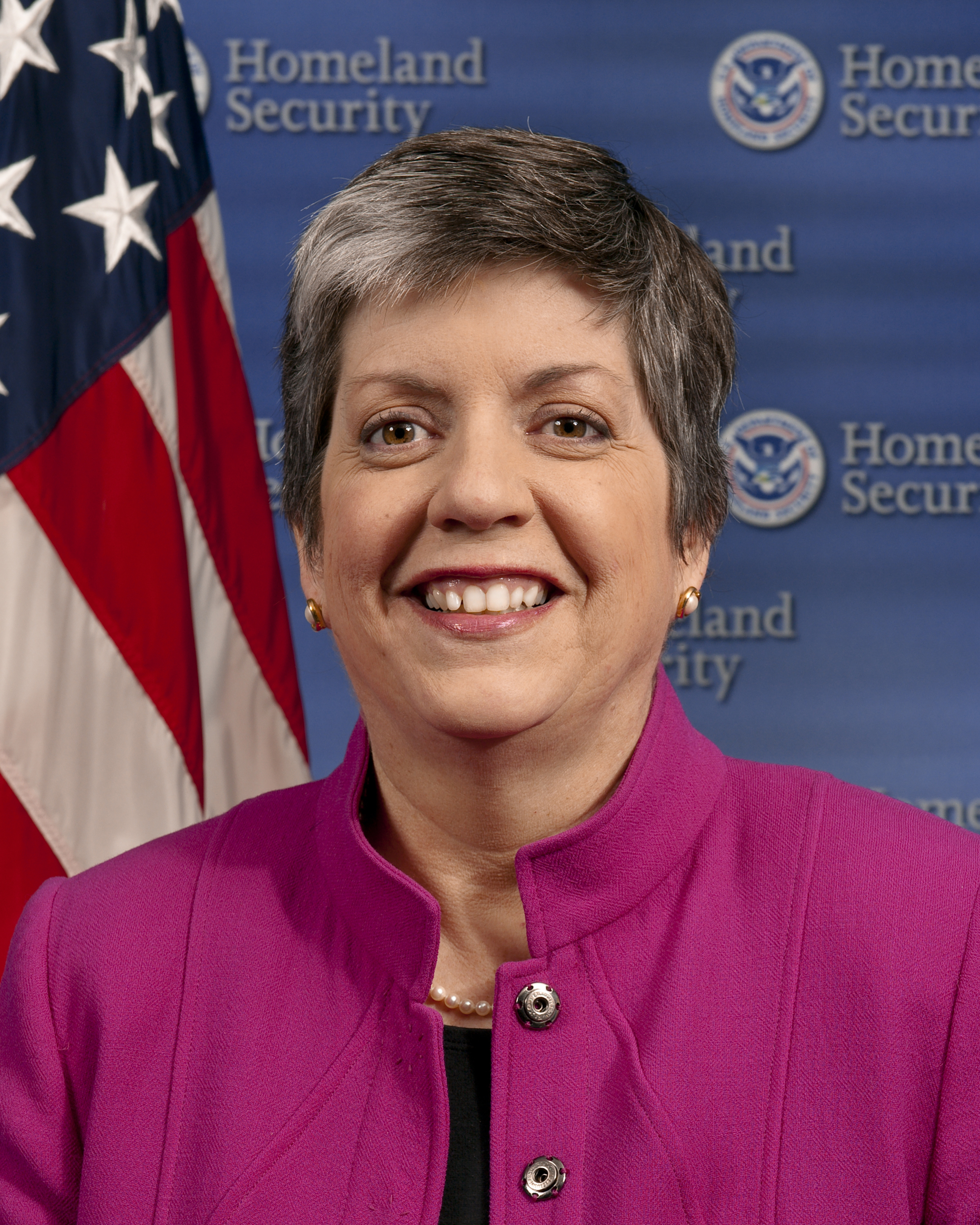
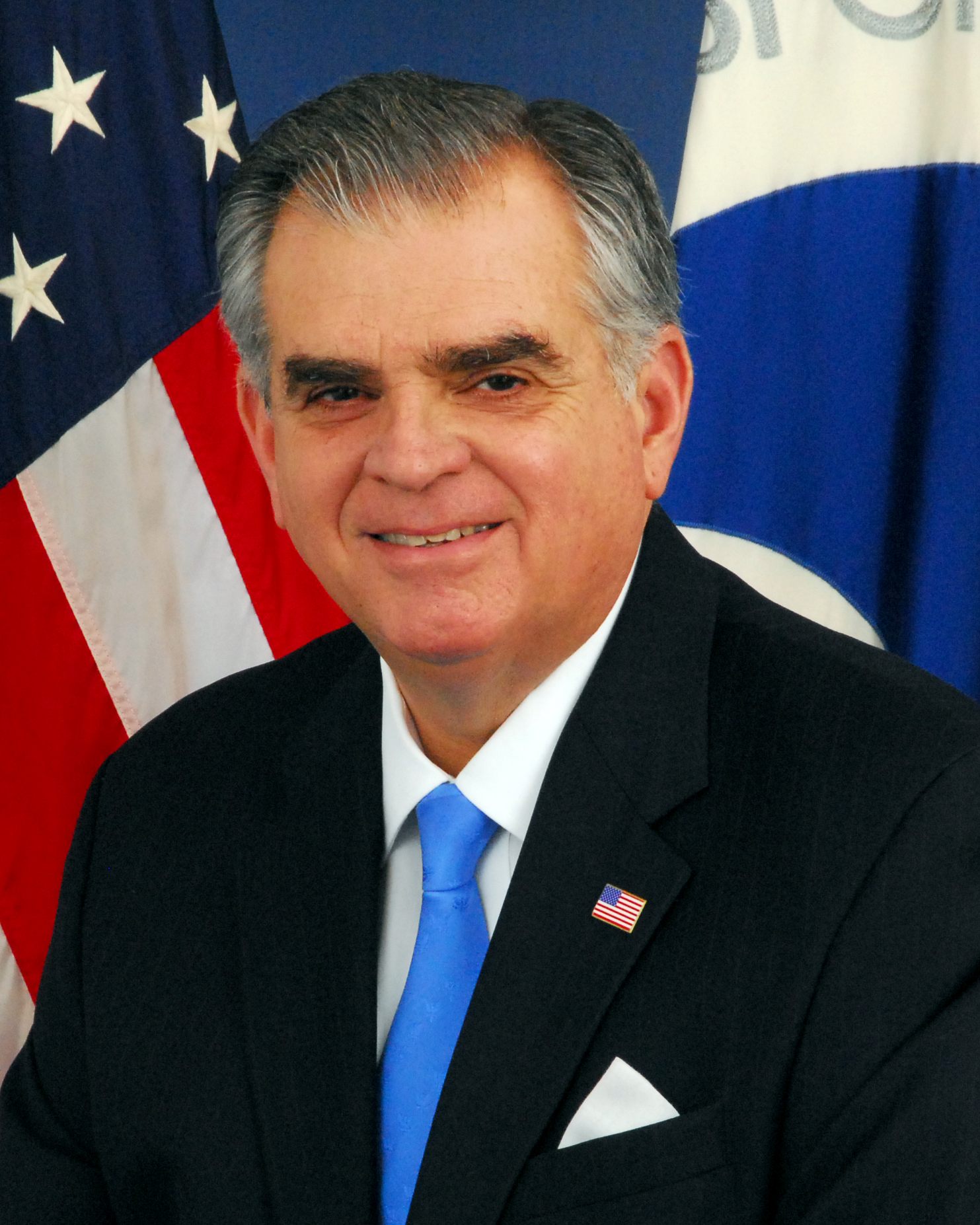
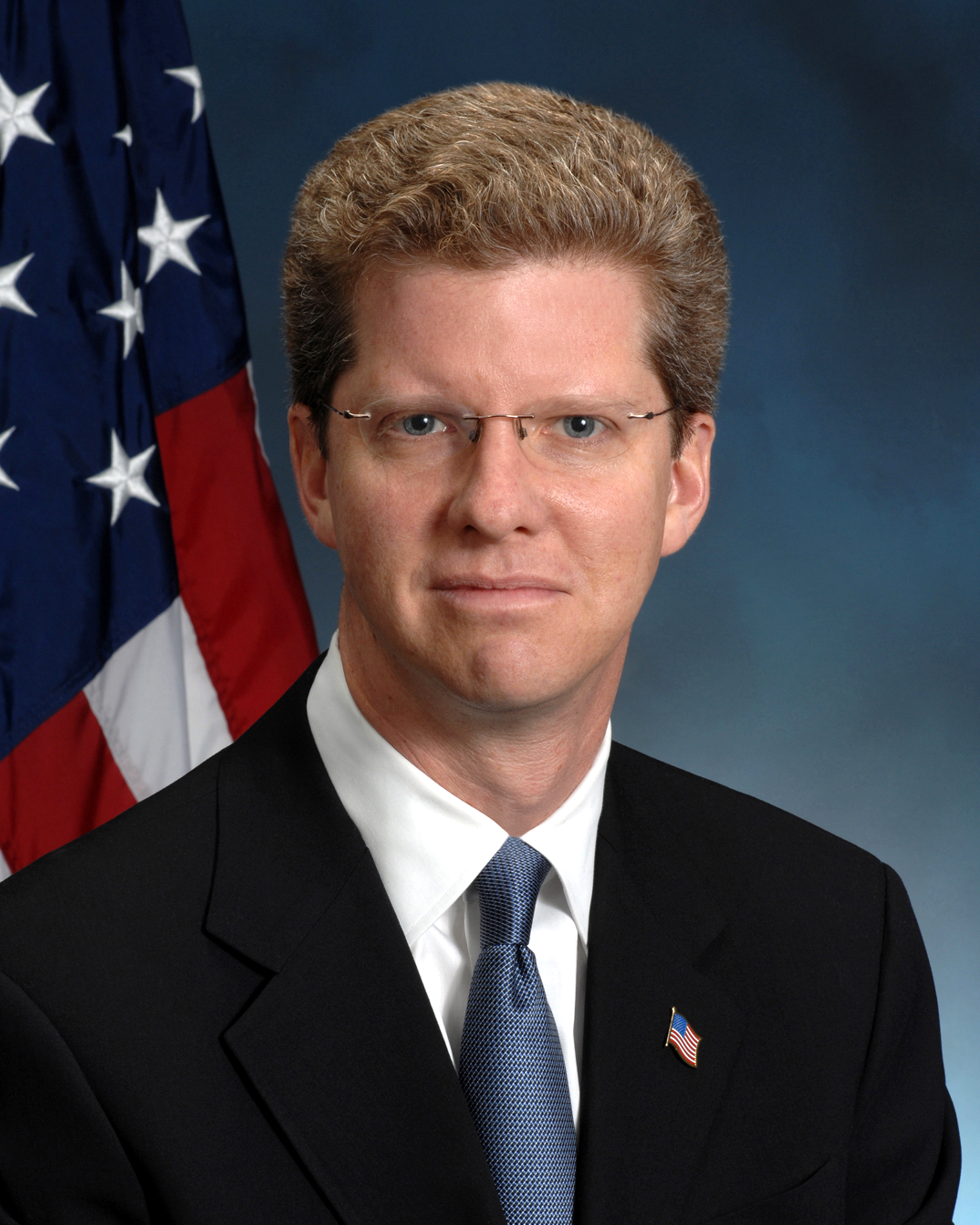
Left to right: Shinseki and Napolitano were Inauguration Day unanimous confirmations. LaHood and Donovan were confirmed unanimously two days later.

On March 2, Obama introduced Kansas governor Kathleen Sebelius as his second choice for Secretary of Health and Human Services. He also introduced Nancy-Ann DeParle as head of the new White House Office of Health Reform, which he suggested would work closely with the Department of Health and Human Services. Ron Kirk was confirmed on March 18 by a 92–5 vote in the Senate., and by the end of March, Sebelius was the only remaining Cabinet member yet to be confirmed.

By comparison, Bill Clinton only had one outstanding Cabinet confirmation at the end of his first day in office and George W. Bush had all but one approved before February 1, 2001. Ronald Reagan had twelve of thirteen Cabinet members confirmed before February 1, and Jimmy Carter had all eleven of his confirmed. George H. W. Bush only had seven of thirteen confirmed by this time. Whereas his predecessors had to trade favours for contentious approvals such as Zoe Baird (Clinton), John Tower (G.H.W. Bush), or John Ashcroft (G.W. Bush), Obama has largely focused on the American Recovery and Reinvestment Act of 2009, a proposed economic stimulus package totalling nearly $1 trillion.

=== Cabinet nominations ===
During the presidential transition between the election and the inauguration, Obama named Bill Richardson to be his Commerce Secretary. Richardson withdrew his nomination on January 5 because of scrutiny regarding a pay to play scandal in which he was being investigated because his donors curiously received a lucrative transportation contract. On February 3, Obama announced the nomination of Republican Judd Gregg in his place.

Cabinet Confirmations
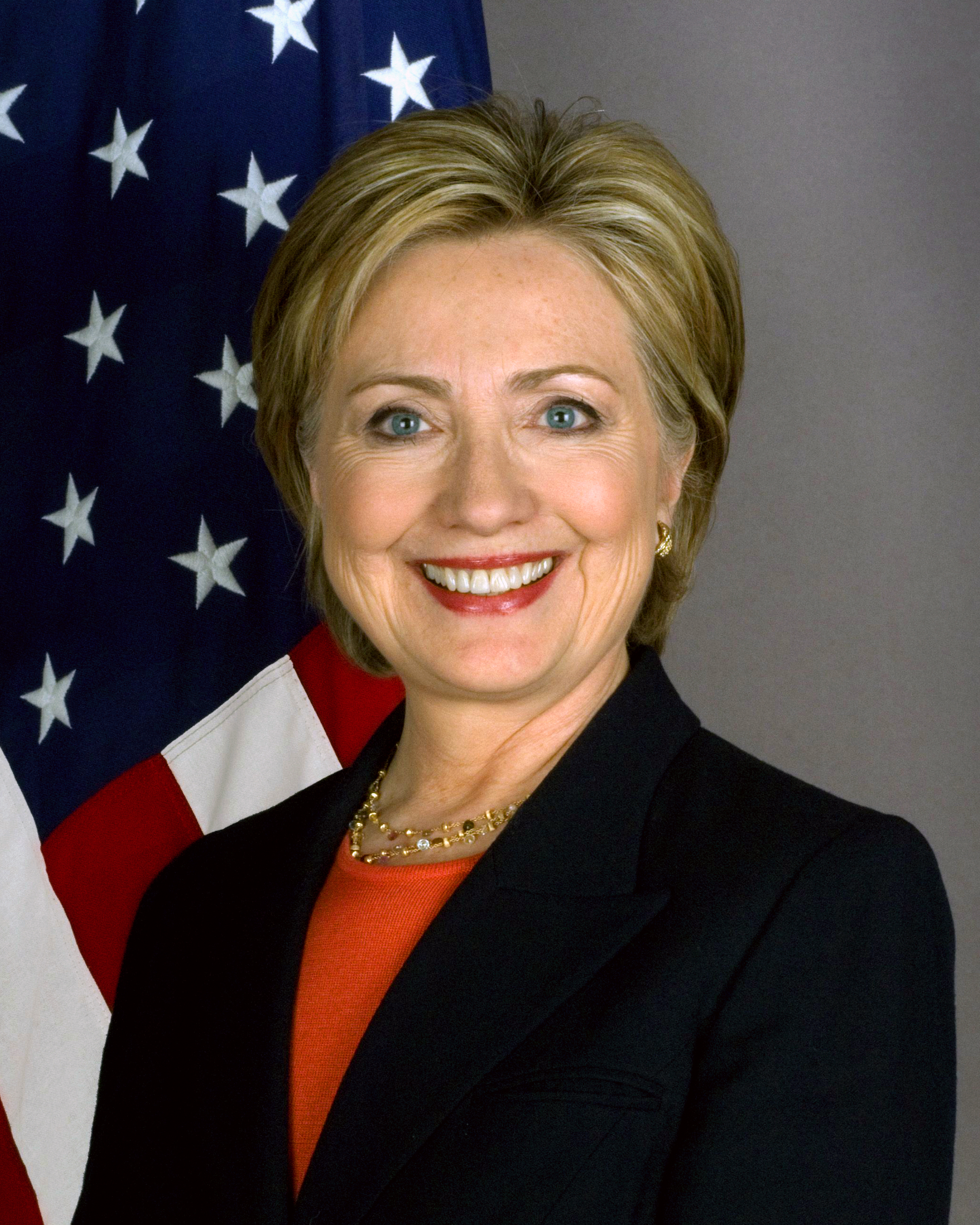
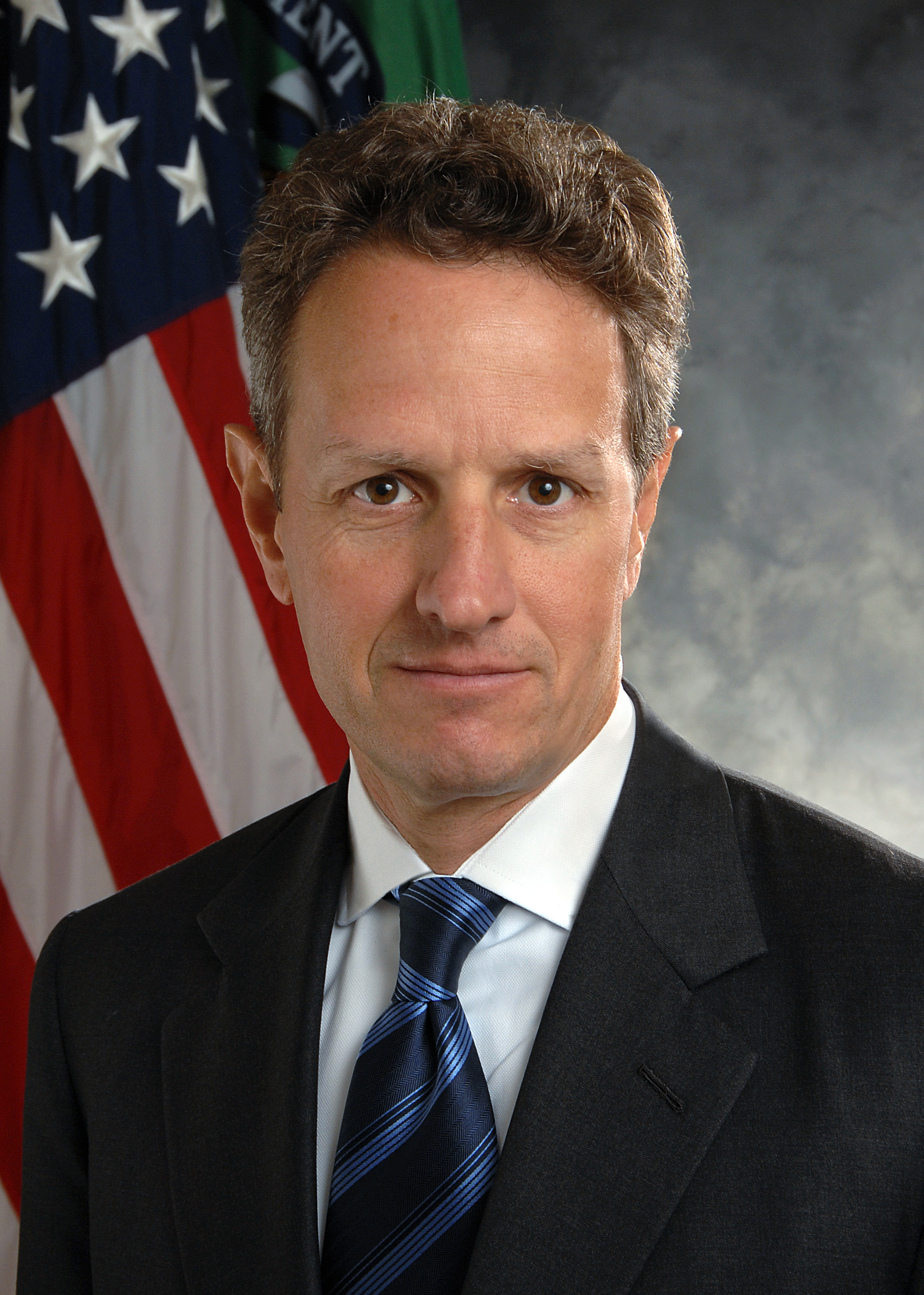
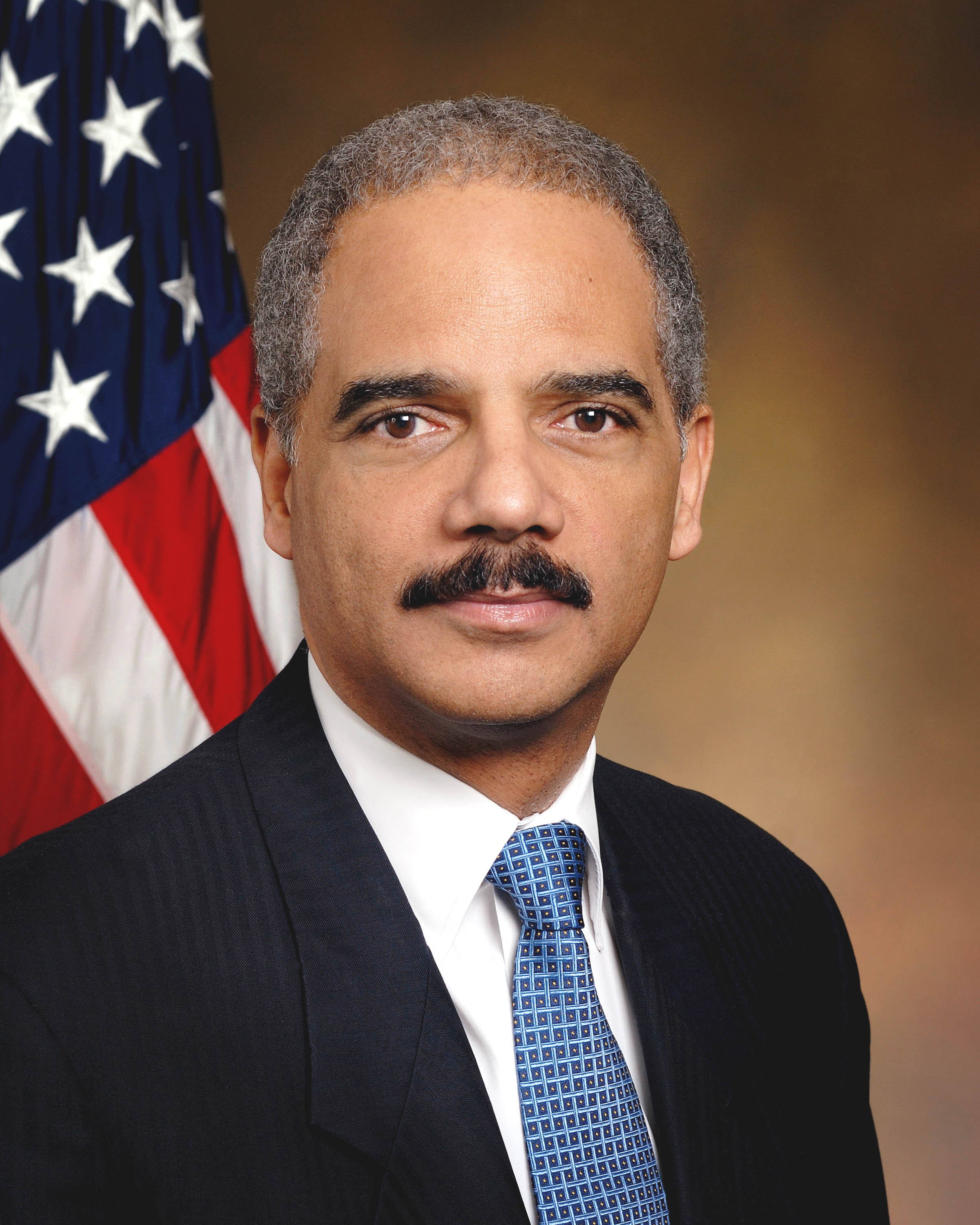
Left to right: Clinton, Geithner, and Holder were controversial confirmations during the first two weeks.

Tom Daschle was Obama's original nominee for Health and Human Services Secretary. However, he owed over $128,000 in taxes over three years, failed to report more than $83,000 in consulting fees in 2007, and owed $12,000 in interest and penalties. He also provided insufficient documentation for $15,000 of the $276,000 in charitable contributions that he and his wife, Linda, gave during the three-year period being studied by the panel. Daschle also had some miscommunications with his accountant on the $255,000 use of a luxury car service that was used 80% for personal services. Daschle paid his back taxes six days before his first confirmation hearings with the United States Senate Committee on Health, Education, Labor, and Pensions. On February 3, The New York Times called the Daschle nomination into question both for his tax issues and for his extensive private sector work in the health services industry. The editorial noted that although Daschle was aware of his tax problem in June 2008, he did not correct it until his cabinet nomination. Later that day, Daschle withdrew his nomination.

Though Hillary Clinton was ultimately confirmed on January 21 by a 95–2 vote, with David Vitter (R-Louisiana) and Jim DeMint (R-South Carolina) in dissent, Senate Republicans slowed the process due to objections over the charitable activities of Clinton's husband, former President Bill Clinton. John Cornyn (R-Texas) held up proceedings for a day to discuss this matter. Richard Lugar (R-Indiana), the ranking Republican on the Foreign Relations Committee, expressed an interest in President Bill Clinton's foundation reject foreign contributions to avoid possible conflict of interest. Sen. Clinton contended that the foundation's disclosure plans already exceeded legal requirements.

Cabinet Withdrawals
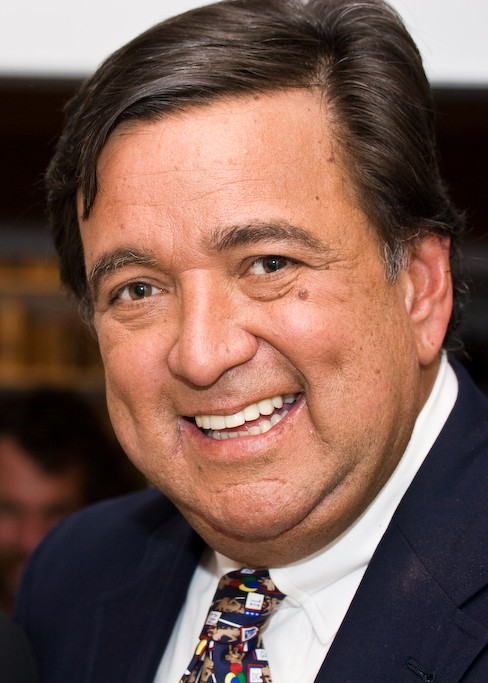
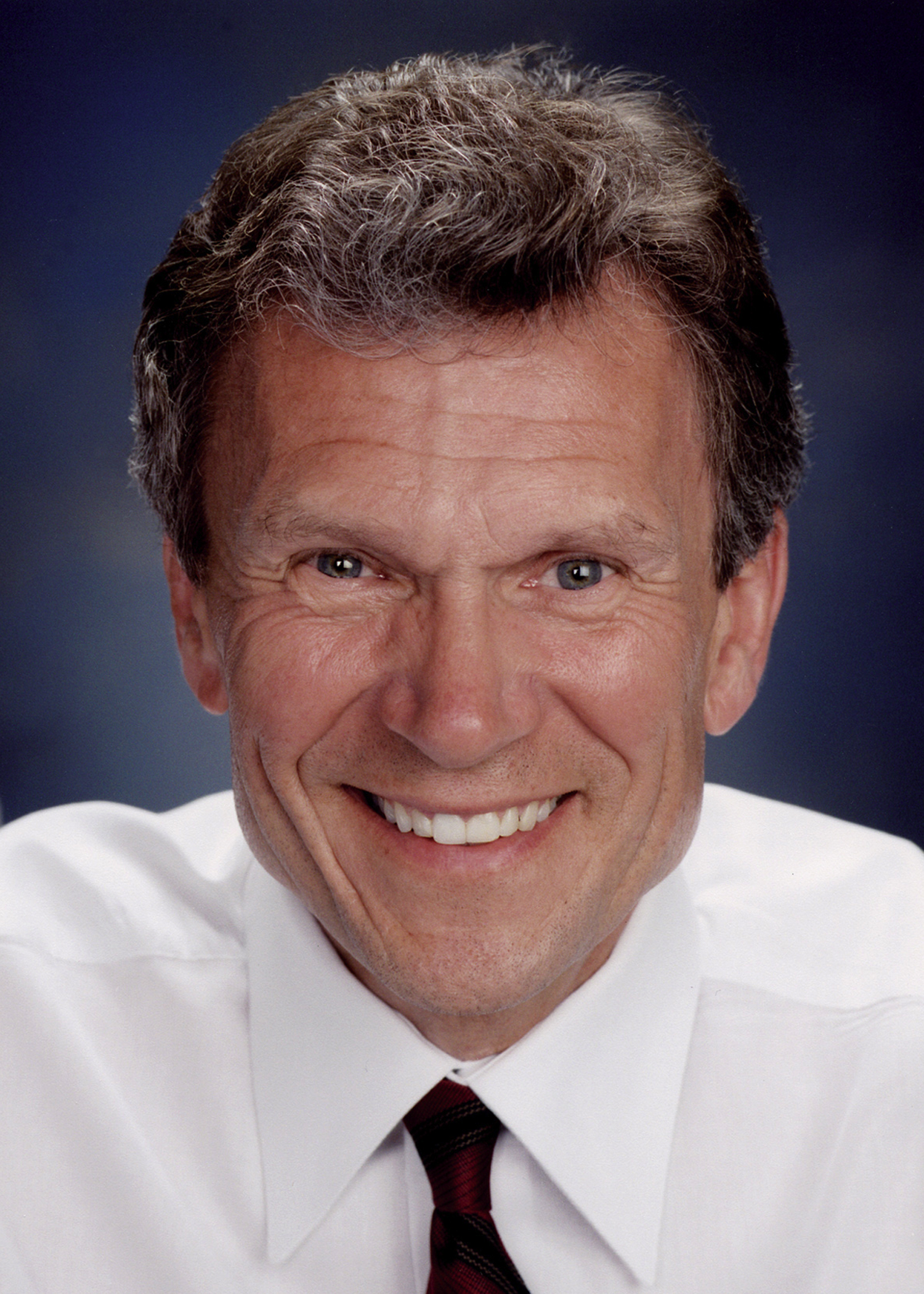
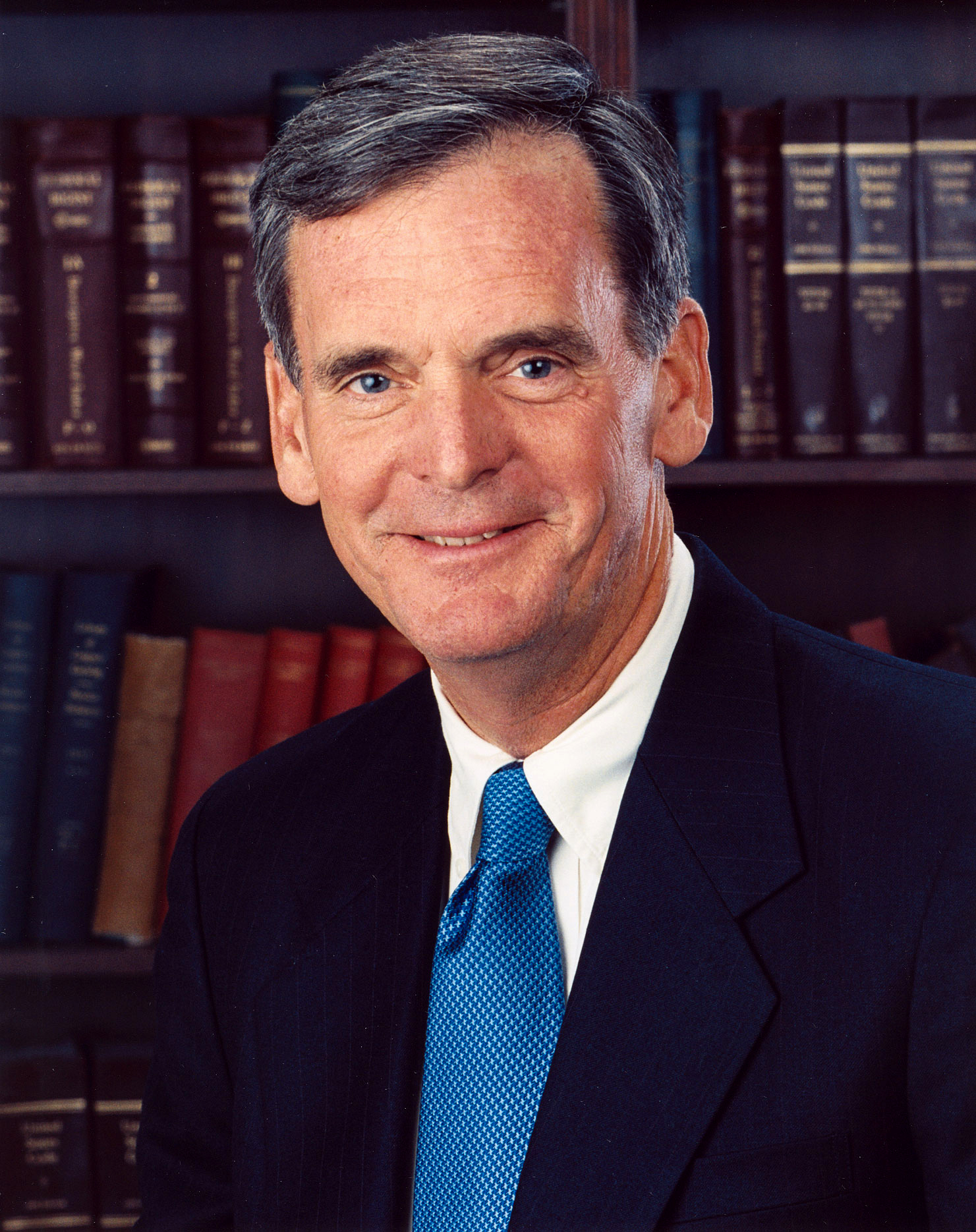
Left to right: Richardson, Daschle and Gregg were original Obama appointees who withdrew their nominations.

Timothy Geithner, who was nominated as Treasury Secretary, also encountered tax issues. He apologised to the United States Senate Committee on Finance for having overlooked paying $34,000 in Social Security and Medicare taxes earlier this decade. The committee endorsed Geithner by an 18–5 margin with half of the ten Republicans opposing the nomination. He was confirmed despite failure to pay a total of $43,000 in taxes and penalties, which troubled the Senate.

Holder was endorsed by the United States Senate Committee on the Judiciary by a 17–2 margin on January 28. Dissent on his confirmation centred on his support for some of Bill Clinton's controversial pardons and commutations of sentence. Republican Cornyn had sought a pledge from Holder that he would not prosecute intelligence agents who participated in harsh interrogations, but Holder, who if confirmed will have to review Justice Department officials who may have violated the law for possible prosecution, refused to give such a pledge.

Obama had nominated Nancy Killefer for the position of Chief Performance Officer, but Killefer withdrew on February 3 after it was revealed that she had failed to pay the unemployment compensation tax for a household employee for a period of 18 months.

Late Cabinet Confirmations
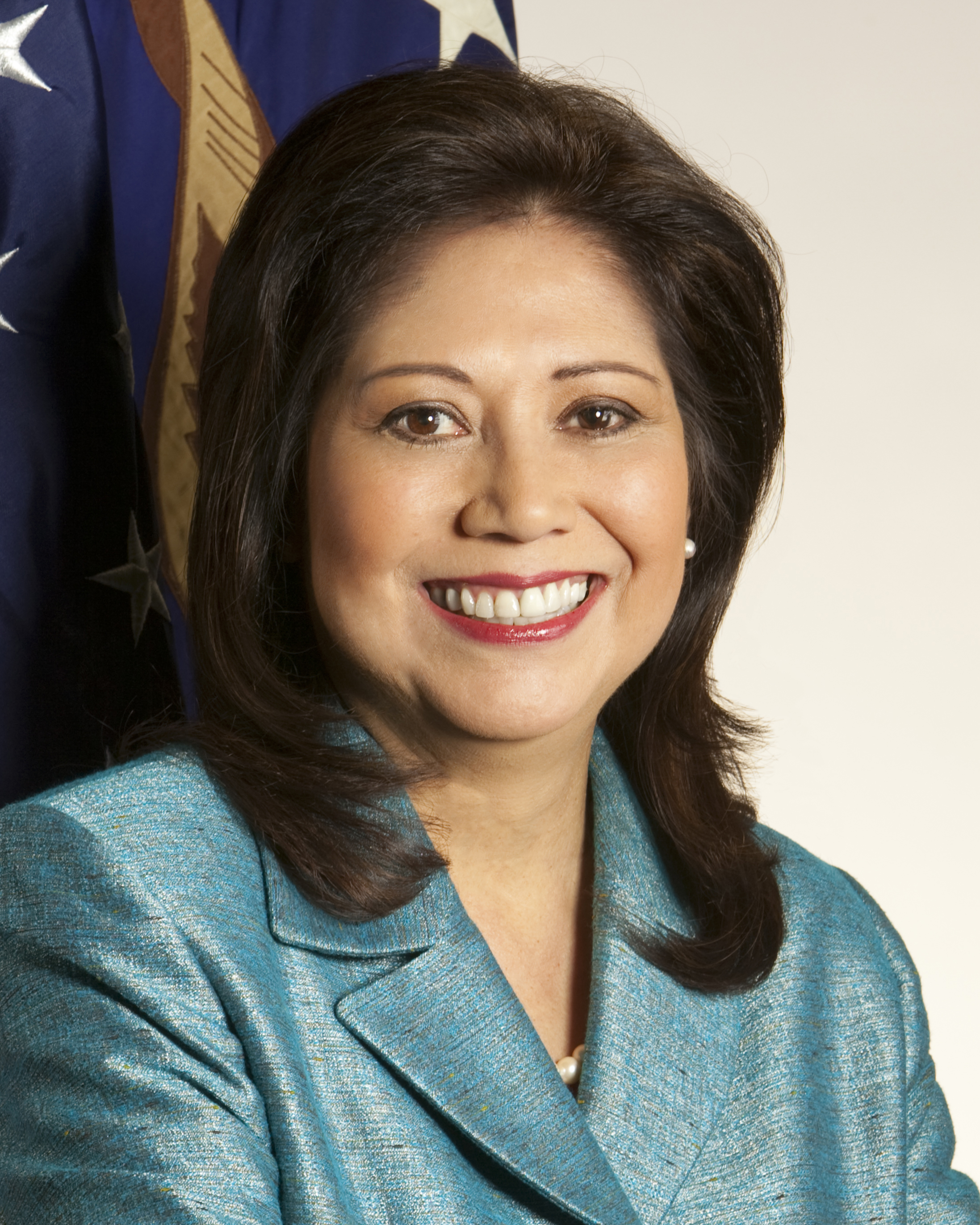
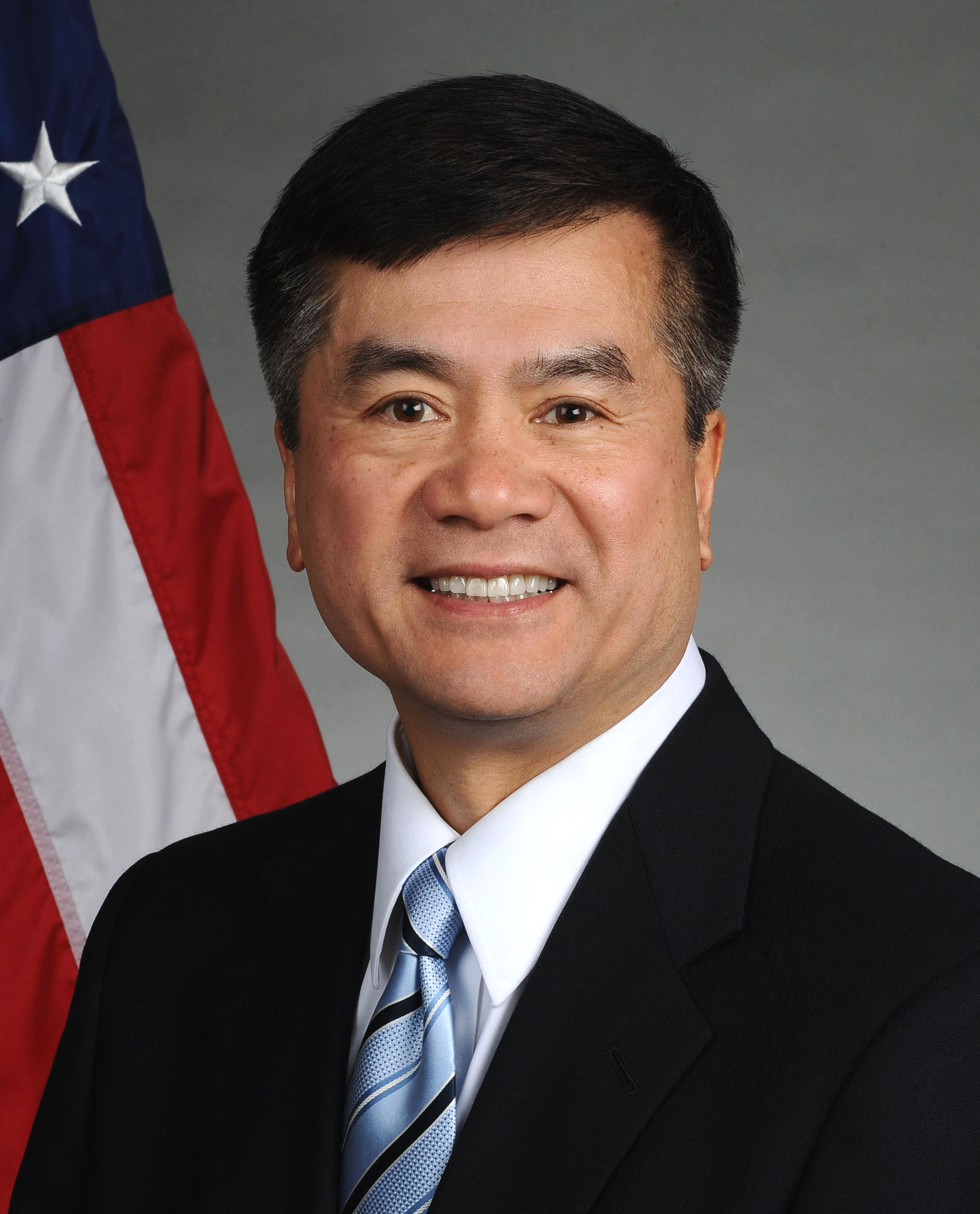
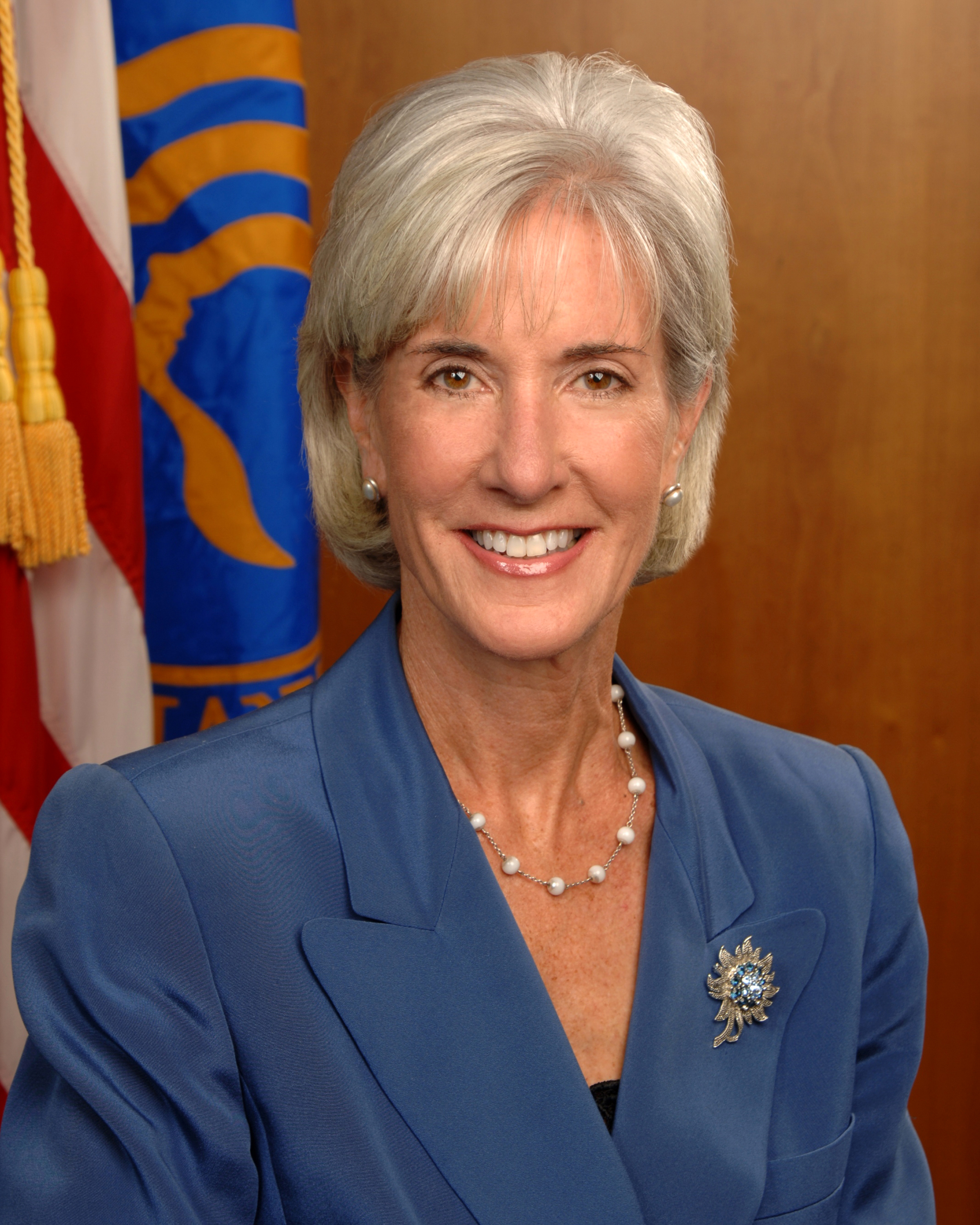
Left to right: Solis was confirmed on February 24 and Gary Locke was confirmed as the Commerce Secretary on March 24. Kathleen Sebelius was confirmed as the Health and Human Services Secretary on April 28. Sebelius was the last Cabinet nominee to be confirmed by the Senate.

The vote on Hilda Solis for Secretary of Labor had originally been scheduled for February 5, but she faced delayed confirmation hearings due to her pro-labor activities as a board member of American Rights at Work and because of $6,400 in unpaid tax liens against her husband's auto repair business. Both Solis, who was uninvolved in the business, and her husband claimed not to have had any knowledge of the 16-year-old liens prior to their disclosure by a newspaper, and they paid it when notified. Delays were however exacerbated due to Solis' perceived unresponsiveness to questions. On February 11, the United States Senate Committee on Health, Education, Labor, and Pensions voted by voice vote to endorse Hilda Solis as the Labor Secretary, with the only dissenting members of the 22-person committee Republicans Tom Coburn and Pat Roberts. Solis was later confirmed on February 24.

On February 12, Senator Judd Gregg withdrew his name from consideration as United States Commerce Secretary. Judd cited policy differences between himself and the Obama administration as his primary reasons and noted that unlike earlier withdrawals he was not having difficulties with the vetting process. He had reservations about the stimulus package and about the changes being made in the United States Census Bureau as his primary concerns.

Gregg has a track record of opposing funding for the Census, that is highlighted by his tenure as the Chairman of the United States Senate Committee on the Budget. The Congressional Black Caucus and National Association of Latino Elected and Appointed Officials both expressed disappointment at Gregg's nomination because the United States Department of Commerce oversees the Census. The White House subsequently said it take control of the 2010 United States census, but then backpedaled saying that they would "work closely" with the United States Census Director. Republicans were alarmed by the foreshadowing of "backroom deals" by the White House and Rahm Emanuel.

While pundits puzzled over U.S. Trade Representative-designate Ron Kirk's failure to be confirmed by March 2009, it was reported on March 2 that Kirk owed over $10,000 in back taxes. Kirk agreed to pay them in exchange for Senate Finance Committee Chairman Max Baucus's aid in speeding up the confirmation process; he was later confirmed on March 18.

On March 31, Kathleen Sebelius, Obama's nominee for Health and Human Services secretary, revealed in a letter to the Senate Finance Committee that her Certified Public Accountant found errors in her tax returns for years 2005–2007. She, along with her husband, paid more than $7,000 in back taxes, along with $878 in interest.

=== Notable non-Cabinet positions ===
Appointees serve at the pleasure of the President and were nominated by Barack Obama except as noted.

- Sheila Bair, Chair of the Federal Deposit Insurance Corporation^{1}
- Retired Admiral Dennis C. Blair, Director of National Intelligence
- Richard Holbrooke, special envoy for Afghanistan and Pakistan
- Retired General James L. Jones, Assistant to the President for National Security Affairs
- George J. Mitchell, special envoy to the Middle East
- Robert Mueller, Director of the Federal Bureau of Investigation^{2}
- Leon Panetta, Director of the Central Intelligence Agency
- Christina Romer, Chair of the Council of Economic Advisers
- Dennis Ross, Special Advisor for the Gulf and Southwest Asia under the Secretary of State
- Mary Schapiro, Chair of the Securities and Exchange Commission
- Lawrence Summers, Assistant to the President for Economic Policy and Director of National Economic Council
- Paul Volcker, Chairman of the Economic Recovery Advisory Board

^{1}Appointed by George W. Bush in 2006 to a five-year term
^{2}Appointed by George W. Bush in 2001 to a ten-year term

== Policy ==
Address Before a Joint Session of Congress (February 24, 2009) (52:20)
Barack Obama's February 24, 2009 Address Before a Joint Session of Congress

Address Before a Joint Session of Congress (February 24, 2009) (audio)
Audio-only version

One of the first acts by the Obama administration after assuming control was an order signed by Chief of Staff Rahm Emanuel that suspended all pending federal regulations proposed by outgoing President George W. Bush so that they could be reviewed. This was comparable to prior moves by the Bush Administration upon assuming control from Bill Clinton, who in his final 20 days in office issued 12 executive orders.

Due to the economic crisis, the President enacted a pay freeze for senior White House staff making more than $100,000 per year. The action affected approximately 120 staffers and added up to about a $443,000 savings for the United States government.

Obama also announced stricter guidelines regarding lobbyists in an effort to raise the ethical standards of the White House. The new policy bans aides from attempting to influence the administration for at least two years if they leave his staff. It also bans aides on staff from working on matters they have previously lobbied on, or to approach agencies that they targeted while on staff. Their ban also included a gift-giving ban. However, one day later he nominated William J. Lynn III, a lobbyist for defence contractor Raytheon, for the position of Deputy Secretary of Defense. Obama later nominated William Corr, an anti-tobacco lobbyist, for Deputy Secretary of Health and Human Services.

In his first week in office, President Obama signed an executive order suspending all the ongoing proceedings of Guantanamo military commission and ordering that the detention facility would be shut down within the year. He also signed an order requiring the Army Field Manual to be used as guide for terror interrogations, banning torture and other illegal coercive techniques, such as waterboarding. He also signed the Protocol III of United Nations Convention on Certain Conventional Weapons to restrict the usage of incendiary weapons. Obama also issued an executive order entitled "Ethics Commitments by Executive Branch Personnel," setting stricter limitations on incoming executive branch employees and placing tighter restrictions on lobbying in the White House. Obama signed two Presidential Memoranda concerning energy independence, ordering the Department of Transportation to establish higher fuel efficiency standards before 2011 models are released and allowing states to raise their emissions standards above the national standard. He also ended the Mexico City Policy, which banned funds to international groups that provide abortion services or counselling.

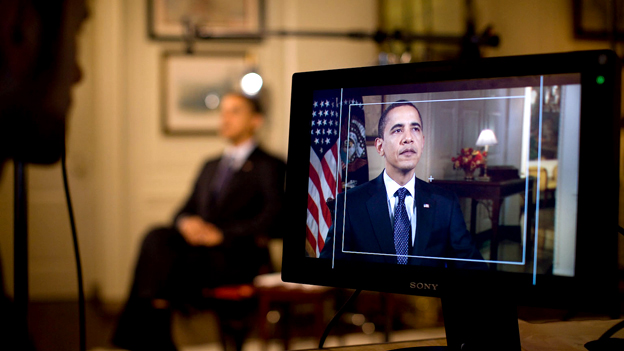
Barack Obama preparing for his weekly address

In his first week he also established a policy of producing a weekly Saturday morning video address available on Whitehouse.gov and YouTube, much like those released during his transition period. The first address had been viewed by 600,000 YouTube viewers by the next afternoon. The policy is likened to Franklin Delano Roosevelt's fireside chats and George W. Bush's weekly radio addresses.

The first piece of legislation signed by Obama was the Lilly Ledbetter Fair Pay Act on January 29, which promoted fair pay regardless of gender, race, or age. Lilly Ledbetter joined Obama and his wife, Michelle, as he signed the bill, fulfilling his campaign pledge to nullify Ledbetter v. Goodyear.

On February 18, 2009, Obama announced that the U.S. military presence in Afghanistan would be bolstered by 17,000 new troops by summer. The announcement followed the recommendation of several experts including Defense Secretary Robert Gates that additional troops be deployed to the strife-torn South Asian country.

Nine days after his speech on Afghanistan, Obama addressed Marines at Camp Lejeune, North Carolina, and outlined an exit strategy for the Iraq War. Obama promised to withdraw all combat troops from Iraq by August 31, 2010, and a "transitional force" of up to 50,000 counterterrorism, advisory, training, and support personnel by the end of 2011.

On March 10, 2009, Barack Obama, in a meeting with the New Democrat Coalition, told them that he was a "New Democrat", "pro-growth Democrat", "supports free and fair trade", and "very concerned about a return to protectionism."

On April 5, 2009, Barack Obama promoted the goal of a nuclear-free world.

=== Policy review ===
The stimulus package passed in the House of Representatives on January 28 without a single Republican vote. The Republicans developed opposition without developing consensus on an alternative plan. Conservatives who have been supportive of Obama have come out against the plan. The Wall Street Journal has questioned whether the $825 billion package is well designed. However, Duncan notes that one of the largest components, $140 billion earmarked for education, is well spent. Christopher Dodd is credited with inserting the last-minute pay limit into American Recovery and Reinvestment Act of 2009. The pay restrictions included prohibition of bonuses in excess of one-third of total salary for any company receiving any money from the plan and was retroactive to companies that received funds under Troubled Assets Relief Program. The limit was a significant alteration of the administration's plan and caught Treasury Secretary Timothy Geithner and National Economic Council Chairman Lawrence Summers by surprise.

After Obama announced deadlines for the phased withdrawal of U.S. military forces from Iraq, Congress broadly endorsed the president's plan and agreed to legislate the stated timetables, though some in the Democratic Party balked at the 50,000-head figure for the transitional force and many in the Republican Party criticised the deadlines' rigidity. Arizona Senator John McCain, the Republican presidential nominee in the 2008 election, voiced support for his former rival's plan.

== Other notable events ==
On March 19, Obama became the first sitting president to appear on a late night talk show when he was a guest on The Tonight Show with Jay Leno. On April 2, Obama attended the G-20 London Summit. On April 17–19 he attended the 5th Summit of the Americas where he met Venezuela's President Hugo Chavez, a longtime enemy of Washington, who shook his hand and gave him the book Las venas abiertas de América Latina (Open Veins of Latin America) of Eduardo Galeano while media was present. On April 28, day 99 of Obama's presidency, Senator Arlen Specter (a former Democrat who switched to the Republican party in 1966) returned to the Democratic Party. Specter increased the Democratic senators to 59, one short of a filibuster-proof majority. At the conclusion of the first 100 days, over 100 federal judgeships remained vacant.

== See also ==
- Presidential transition of Barack Obama
