= Michael Cardenas =

American businessman

13th Administrator of the Small Business Administration
- In office March 30, 1981 – February 3, 1982
- President: Ronald Reagan
- Preceded by: A. Vernon Weaver
- Succeeded by: James C. Sanders

Personal details
- Born: July 14, 1933 (age 92); Fresno, California
- Political party: Republican

Michael Cardenas (born July 14, 1933) is an American businessman who served as Administrator of the Small Business Administration from 1981 to 1982.
