= Tami Perriello =

American government official

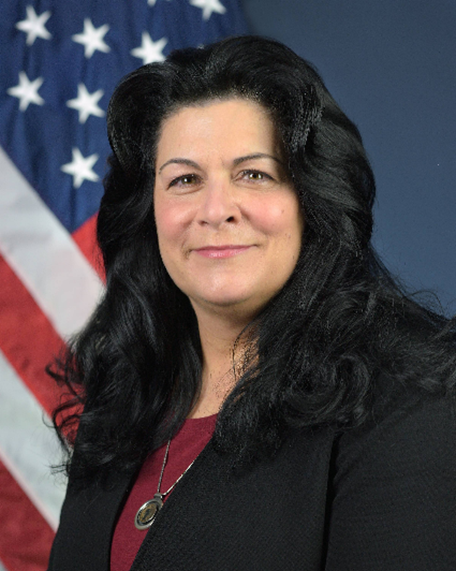

Administrator of the Small Business Administration
- Acting
- In office January 20, 2021 – March 17, 2021
- President: Joe Biden
- Preceded by: Jovita Carranza
- Succeeded by: Isabel Guzman

Personal details
- Education: Rochester Institute of Technology (BS); Johns Hopkins University (MS)

Tami Perriello is an American government official and the chief financial officer of the Small Business Administration. She was acting administrator of the SBA from January 20, 2021, to March 17, 2021. Perriello has previously been associate administrator and CFO for the Pipeline and Hazardous Materials Safety Administration.

Political offices
Preceded by Jovita Carranza	Administrator of the Small Business Administration; Acting; 2021	Succeeded by Isabel Guzman
