= Wendell B. Barnes =

American politician (1909–1985)

2nd Administrator of the Small Business Administration
- In office February 9, 1954 – November 21, 1959
- President: Dwight D. Eisenhower
- Preceded by: William D. Mitchell
- Succeeded by: Philip McCallum

Member of the Oklahoma House of Representatives
- In office 1950–1952

Personal details
- Born: August 23, 1909 Ponca City, Oklahoma, U.S.
- Died: June 11, 1985 (aged 75) Walnut Creek, California, U.S.
- Party: Republican

Wendell B. Barnes (August 23, 1909 – June 11, 1985) was an American politician who served as the 2nd administrator of the Small Business Administration from 1954 to 1959 and who served in the Oklahoma House of Representatives between 1950 and 1952. Born in Ponca City, Oklahoma, Barnes graduated from Brown University in 1928 and from the University of Michigan Law School in 1935. (Note: The biography included as part of Barnes' hearing before the U.S. Senate Committee on Banking and Currency indicates that he also graduated from Culver Military Institute (Culver, Indiana) before attending Brown University.)

== Career in law ==
Barnes practiced law in a private practice (Gavin & Barnes) in Tulsa, Oklahoma from 1939 to 1941, when he became general counsel for the Tulsa plant of Douglas Aircraft Co. from 1941 to 1946. Barnes worked on formulating legislation as assistant attorney for the Oklahoma Tax Commission from 1935 to 1939. He became a partner in going into general practice in 1939. Barnes served in the Oklahoma House of Representatives from 1950 to 1952 and as Administrator of the Small Business Administration from 1954 to 1959.

== Career in business ==
Barnes resigned from the SBA in November, 1959, and soon joined Shearson, Hammill & Co., a national brokerage and underwriting firm, as a special consultant and later as a general partner. In 1964, he joined the Western Wood Products Association in Portland, Oregon as Executive Vice President. He remained there until 1972. After that, he worked as an executive recruiter, a San Francisco real estate developer, and as a director for several corporations.
