= Mitchell P. Kobelinski =

American attorney

11th Administrator of the Small Business Administration
- In office February 12, 1976 – March 4, 1977
- President: Gerald Ford; Jimmy Carter
- Preceded by: Thomas S. Kleppe
- Succeeded by: A. Vernon Weaver

Member of the Board of Directors of the Export–Import Bank of the United States
- In office July 17, 1973 – February 12, 1976
- President: Richard Nixon; Gerald Ford
- Preceded by: Tom Lilley
- Succeeded by: Margaret W. Kahliff

Personal details
- Born: August 1, 1928 Chicago, Illinois, U.S.
- Died: November 7, 1997 (aged 69) Chicago, Illinois, U.S.
- Party: Republican

Mitchell P. Kobelinski (August 1, 1928 – November 7, 1997) was an American attorney who served as a member of the Board of Directors of the Export–Import Bank of the United States from 1973 to 1976 and as Administrator of the Small Business Administration from 1976 to 1977. According Kobelinski, his top priority at the federal agency was to eliminate unnecessary red tape and paperwork for businessmen who are seeking loans. Meanwhile, he considered consumerism "a facade for socialism."

He died on November 7, 1997, in Chicago, Illinois, at age 69.
