= James C. Sanders =

American businessman (1926–2018)

James Sanders

14th Administrator of the Small Business Administration
- In office March 29, 1982 – March 31, 1986
- President: Ronald Reagan
- Preceded by: Michael Cardenas
- Succeeded by: James Abdnor

Personal details
- Born: November 7, 1926; Kansas City, Missouri, U.S.
- Died: March 31, 2018 (aged 91); Monterey, California, U.S.
- Political party: Republican

James C. Sanders (November 7, 1926 – March 31, 2018) was an American businessman who served as Administrator of the Small Business Administration from 1982 to 1986.
