= Valley Grove (disambiguation) =

Valley Grove may refer to:

- Valley Grove (Wheeling Township, Minnesota)
- Valley Grove, West Virginia

== See also ==
- Valley Grove School District
