= Jeanne Hulit =

American politician

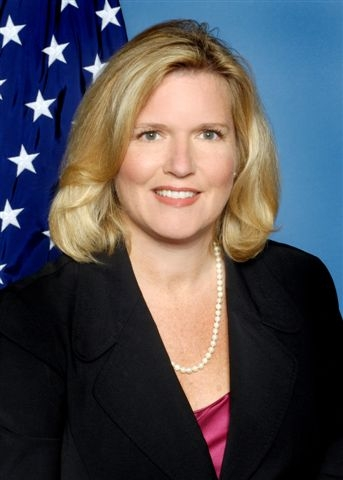

Administrator of the Small Business Administration
- Acting
- In office September 1, 2013 – February 7, 2014
- President: Barack Obama
- Preceded by: Karen Mills
- Succeeded by: Marianne Markowitz (acting)

Personal details
- Born: 1958 (age 67–68)
- Party: Democratic
- Education: American University (BA); Boston University (MBA)

Jeanne A. Hulit (born 1958) served as Acting Administrator of the Small Business Administration from September 2013 to February 2014.

Hulit is the president and CEO of Maine Community Bancorp, INC. She has served in this role since October 2018. Prior, Hulit served as President of Village Candle, a Wells, Maine-based candle and fragrance company in 2017, after serving as President of the Northeast Community Banking Division at Lewiston, Maine-based Northeast Bancorp since February 2014.

Hulit was appointed to serve as SBA's New England Regional Administrator in August 2009. She then was transferred to Washington as Associate Administrator for SBA's Office of Capital Access since February 2012, where she was adviser to Administrator Karen Mills and oversaw the agency's loan programs.

Before joining the SBA, Hulit spent 18 years in banking, serving as senior vice president for commercial lending at Citizens Bank, vice president and middle market lender at KeyBank, and manager of Key's International Banking Division. Previously, she served as deputy director of the International Division at the Maine Department of Economic and Community Development. Hulit has also held a number of civic and economic leadership roles, including her tenure as a founder and chair of the Maine International Trade Center, and her service as chair for the University of Southern Maine Board of Visitors.

Political offices
Preceded by Karen Mills	Administrator of the Small Business Administration; Acting; 2013–2014	Succeeded by Marianne Markowitz; Acting
