= Eugene P. Foley =

5th Administrator of the Small Business Administration
- In office August 8, 1963 – September 10, 1965
- President: John F. Kennedy; Lyndon B. Johnson
- Preceded by: John E. Horne
- Succeeded by: Bernard L. Boutin

Personal details
- Born: November 22, 1928 Wabasha, Minnesota, U.S.
- Died: December 30, 2015 (aged 87) Whitefish, Montana, U.S.
- Party: Democratic

Eugene Patrick Foley (November 22, 1928 – December 30, 2015) was an American political strategist who served as Administrator of the Small Business Administration from 1963 to 1965. He left to become the Assistant Secretary of Commerce in charge of the Economic Development Administration in October 1965 for a year before leaving government. His work at the EDA was covered in books such as "Oakland's Not for Burning" 1968 by Amory Bradford and he wrote of it in "The Achieving Ghetto" (1968). On leaving the EDA in 1966 he said "because I could see the way the wind was blowing. Commerce was cracking down on EDA--the White House had decided that EDA should not be spending money in cities. Vietnam was eating everything up."

Foley ran for the United States House of Representatives seat for Minnesota's 1st congressional district as a Democratic-Farmer-Labor candidate in 1958, but lost to Al Quie.

He died of natural causes on December 30, 2015, in Whitefish, Montana, at age 87.
