= Philip McCallum =

American lawyer

3rd Administrator of the Small Business Administration
- In office November 23, 1959 – January 20, 1961
- President: Dwight D. Eisenhower
- Preceded by: Wendell B. Barnes
- Succeeded by: John E. Horne

Personal details
- Born: November 9, 1914 Sault Ste. Marie, Michigan, U.S.
- Died: March 6, 1995 (aged 80) Williamsburg, Virginia, U.S.
- Party: Republican

Philip McCallum (November 9, 1914 – March 6, 1995) was an American attorney who served as Administrator of the Small Business Administration from 1959 to 1961.

Born in Sault Ste. Marie, Michigan, McCallum moved to Ann Arbor, Michigan at an early age. He graduated from University of Michigan and from University of Michigan Law School. McCallum practiced law in Detroit, Michigan, and then in Ann Arbor, Michigan.
