= Marianne Markowitz =

American government official (born 1966)

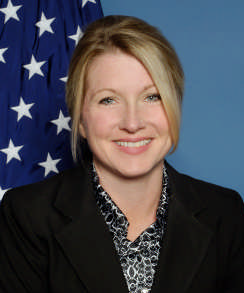

Administrator of the Small Business Administration
- Acting
- In office February 7, 2014 – April 7, 2014
- President: Barack Obama
- Preceded by: Jeanne Hulit (acting)
- Succeeded by: Maria Contreras-Sweet

Personal details
- Born: 1966 (age 59–60) Berkeley, Missouri, U.S.
- Party: Democratic
- Education: University of Missouri–St. Louis (BS); DePaul University (MBA)

Marianne O'Brien Markowitz served as Acting Administrator of the Small Business Administration where she was appointed on February 8, 2014.

Before being named Acting Administrator, Markowitz served as Regional Administrator for SBA's Midwest Region, Region V, a position she had held since August 2009. As regional administrator, Markowitz was responsible for the delivery of the agency's financial assistance, technical assistance and government contracting activities throughout Illinois, Indiana, Michigan, Minnesota, Ohio and Wisconsin. As part of her work in the region, Chicago Mayor Rahm Emanuel appointed Markowitz to serve on the City of Chicago's Small Business Advisory Council in March 2013.

Prior to her time at SBA, Markowitz served as the chief financial officer for Obama for America in 2008 and was previously a financial operations consultant for the launch of the Obama Exploratory Committee. She served on the Obama for America board of directors from 2007 to 2009.

For more than 17 years, Markowitz provided finance and risk management advice to institutions including Switzerland-based Syngenta, Inc., the world's largest agrochemical company, where she served as a lead international treasury/financial operations consultant. While at Syngenta, she was tasked with designing and implementing a global treasury operation and financing post demerger. Prior to that, she served as a treasury and risk manager for one of the largest pharmaceutical benefit management companies Express Scripts, Inc. Additionally, while at Mallinckrodt, Inc., a medical device firm, Markowitz worked to create the global treasury department after its divestiture from IMC Global.

In addition to designing and implementing financial operations departments, Markowitz has had a deep background in running treasury and risk management departments, assessing insurable risks and evaluating insurance, treasury and financing alternatives.

In all her roles, Markowitz specialized in helping private sector companies successfully design and implement new systems or scale their existing processes, systems and staffing to meet the needs of a hyper-growth environment.

She received a B.S. from the University of Missouri and an M.B.A. from DePaul University. She sits on the board of the Lycee Francais de Chicago and is a member of the Chicago Economic Club.

Political offices
Preceded by Jeanne Hulit; Acting	Administrator of the Small Business Administration; Acting; 2013–2014	Succeeded by Maria Contreras-Sweet
