= John E. Horne =

American political strategist

4th Administrator of the Small Business Administration
- In office February 2, 1961 – August 7, 1963
- President: John F. Kennedy
- Preceded by: Philip McCallum
- Succeeded by: Eugene P. Foley

Personal details
- Born: March 4, 1908 Clayton, Alabama, U.S.
- Died: January 8, 1985 (aged 76) Alexandria, Virginia, U.S.
- Party: Democratic

John E. Horne (March 4, 1908 – January 8, 1985) was an American political strategist who served as Administrator of the Small Business Administration from 1961 to 1963. Before being appointed to this position by President John F. Kennedy, he had served as an administrative assistant to Senator John Sparkman.
