= A. Vernon Weaver =

US Ambassador to the European Union

Vernon Weaver

United States Ambassador to the European Union
- In office July 16, 1996 – February 28, 1999
- President: Bill Clinton
- Preceded by: Stuart E. Eizenstat
- Succeeded by: Richard Morningstar

12th Administrator of the Small Business Administration
- In office April 1, 1977 – January 20, 1981
- President: Jimmy Carter
- Preceded by: Mitchell P. Kobelinski
- Succeeded by: Michael Cardenas

Personal details
- Born: Arthur Vernon Weaver Jr. April 16, 1922 Miami, Florida, U.S.
- Died: December 28, 2010 (aged 88) Miami, Florida, U.S.
- Party: Democratic
- Spouse: Joyce McCoy
- Education: University of Florida; United States Naval Academy (BS)

Arthur Vernon Weaver Jr. (April 16, 1922 – December 28, 2010) was the United States ambassador to the European Union. He was nominated by President Bill Clinton and confirmed by the United States Senate on July 16, 1996.

Weaver also served as the administrator for the U.S. Small Business Administration from 1977 to 1981. He was nominated by President Jimmy Carter.

== Education and military career ==
Weaver attended the University of Florida, and then transferred to the United States Naval Academy and graduated in 1946. He would go on serve in the Navy from 1946 to 1953.

Political offices
Preceded by Mitchell P. Kobelinski	Administrator of the Small Business Administration; 1977–1981	Succeeded by Michael Cardenas
Diplomatic posts
Preceded by Stuart E. Eizenstat	United States Ambassador to the European Union; 1996–1999	Succeeded by Richard Morningstar
