= Maria Contreras-Sweet =

American politician (born 1955)

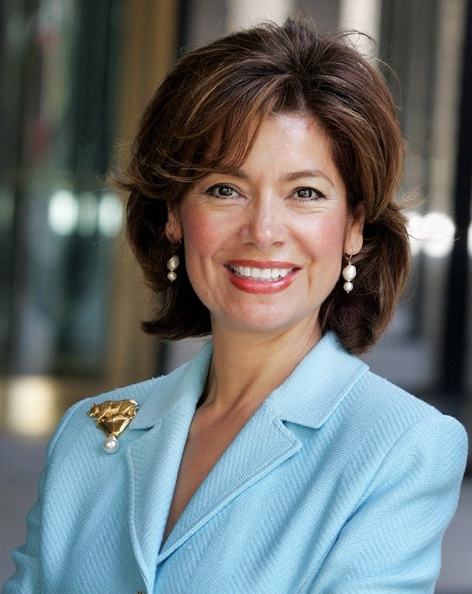
- Official portrait, 2015

24th Administrator of the Small Business Administration
- In office April 7, 2014 – January 20, 2017
- President: Barack Obama
- Preceded by: Marianne Markowitz (acting)
- Succeeded by: Joseph Loddo (acting)

California Secretary of Business, Transportation and Housing Agency
- In office January 4, 1999 – November 17, 2003
- Governor: Gray Davis
- Preceded by: Dean Dunphy
- Succeeded by: Sunny McPeak

Personal details
- Born: 1955 (age 70–71) Guadalajara, Mexico
- Party: Democratic
- Education: San Antonio College (attended); California State University, Los Angeles (BA)

Maria Contreras-Sweet (born 1955) is an American businesswoman and former government official who served as the 24th administrator of the Small Business Administration from 2014 to 2017. She was the executive chairwoman and founder of ProAmérica Bank, a commercial bank focusing on small to mid-sized businesses with a specialty in the Latino community. Born in Guadalajara, Mexico, Contreras-Sweet immigrated to Los Angeles, California, and has since been involved in both the private sector founding a private equity firm and in public service as the California Secretary of Business, Transportation, and Housing under Governor Gray Davis.

On January 15, 2014, she was nominated by President Barack Obama to join his Cabinet as head of the Small Business Administration. She was confirmed as the Administrator of the Small Business Administration by voice vote on March 27, 2014. She assumed that role on April 7, 2014.

== Early life and education ==
Born in Guadalajara, Mexico, Contreras-Sweet's family, including her mother and five siblings, immigrated to the United States when Contreras-Sweet was five years old. Her mother worked at a chicken packaging plant in El-Monte, California to support the family. Contreras-Sweet earned a bachelor's degree from California State University, Los Angeles.

== Career ==
=== Private sector ===
==== 7-Up / RC Bottling Company ====
Contreras-Sweet entered the private sector as the Director of Public Affairs for Westinghouse's 7-Up / RC Bottling Company and rose to vice-president of Public Affairs. During her tenure with the company, they grew their portfolio to include other beverage companies such as Evian, Perrier, Sunkist, Lipton, and several others. Contreras-Sweet became one of the leading corporate negotiators for the creation of the Beverage Container Recycling and Litter Reduction Act of 1986 which introduced the California Redemption Value for bottles and the mass expansion of the recycling system in the state. Contreras-Sweet was a part of the management leveraged buy-out of the Bottling Company, becoming an equity partner.

==== Contreras-Sweet Company ====
Maria Contreras-Sweet started the Contreras-Sweet Company, a marketing and research consulting firm with a specialization in the Latino market. Her clients included The Coca-Cola Company, Pacific Gas and Electric Company, Hoechst AG, The Walt Disney Company, and Sempra Energy.

==== Fortius Holdings, LLC ====
After leaving public office, Contreras-Sweet joined with Edward P. Roski to form Fortius Holdings, LLC, a private venture capital firm that sought to invest in small business with an emphasis in Latino-owned and women-owned businesses.

==== ProAmérica Bank ====
In 2006, Contreras-Sweet became the Founding Chairwoman of the first Latino-formed commercial bank in California in over 35 years, ProAmérica Bank. ProAmérica Bank targets the small business community in Southern California. Maria Contreras-Sweet recruited such notable co-organizers as Henry Cisneros, Edward P. Roski, Alex Chaves, and Solomon Trujillo. ProAmérica Bank's client base includes some of California's most important corporations, foundations, non-profits, and small businesses.

=== Public sector ===
==== State legislature ====
Contreras-Sweet first experienced public service as a secretary for Leo T. McCarthy when he was the Speaker of the California State Assembly. She used her time with him to gain exposure and understanding of the state legislative process. Recognized for her growing know-how and ambition, California Senator Joseph B. Montoya appointed Contreras-Sweet as field deputy where she engaged in constituency affairs, legislative analysis, and public policy proposals.

==== U.S. Census Bureau ====
After working for the state legislature, Contreras-Sweet joined the Department of Commerce as a District Manager for the United States Census Bureau's Decennial Count in 1979. There, she was responsible for over 800 employees and the accurate count of the South East portion of Los Angeles County.

==== California Cabinet Secretary ====
Contreras-Sweet was appointed by Governor Gray Davis to be Cabinet Secretary of the California Business, Transportation and Housing Agency (BTH), becoming the first Latina to be named Cabinet Secretary in United States history. During her 5-year term, Contreras-Sweet was the longest serving BTHA secretary, overseeing 44,000 employees, a $14 billion budget, and 14 state departments. Her projects included:

- Creating of the Department of Managed Health Care and its accompanying Office of Patient Advocate
- Serving as chairwomen for the Commission on Building for the 21st Century and published the Invest for California Infrastructure Report
- Securing funding; building consensus among local, state, and federal governments; and commencing the construction of the eastern span of the San Francisco–Oakland Bay Bridge (at the time, the project was considered one of the largest infrastructure projects in the United States)
- Driving the passage of California Proposition 46, a $2.1 billion housing bond
- Creating the first international architectural competition ever undertaken for a state building, which led to the construction of the Caltrans District 7 Headquarters.
- Serving as Chairwoman of the 2000 United States census for California.

==== Small Business Administration ====
On January 15, 2014, she was nominated by President Barack Obama to join his Cabinet as head of the Small Business Administration. President Obama's first Administrator, Karen Mills, left the position the previous September, and Jeanne Hulit ran the agency in the interim. She was confirmed as the Administrator of the Small Business Administration by voice vote on March 27, 2014. She assumed that role on April 7, 2014.

== Other activities ==
Contreras-Sweet is the Founding President of Hispanas Organized for Political Equality (HOPE). This organization's mission is to provide political education of Hispanic women so that they can improve the communities in which they live for the betterment of all. HOPE's key programs include the HOPE Leadership Institute, Latina Action Day in Sacramento and Washington D.C., and the Youth Leadership through Literacy Program (YLTLP). HOPE celebrated its 20th anniversary in 2009 with a special banquet and video presentation that featured Contreras-Sweet sharing the progress the organization has made through the years.

Contreras-Sweet was appointed by the United States Senate to the original Federal Glass Ceiling Commission. These two investigations examined the effects of the Glass ceiling on women and minorities in the workplace.

Contreras-Sweet is a Founding Director of The California Endowment, a multibillion-dollar philanthropic foundation.

Contreras-Sweet was an elected member of the board of directors for the Blue Cross Blue Shield Association of California during the critical years of its turn-around period and transition to WellPoint (now Anthem). She was selected to serve on the Harvard Women's Leadership Board, which advises Harvard University on women's issues and supports research opportunities for female professors. During her period of service, the university consulted the Board in their selection of Drew Faust, Harvard's first female president. She serves on PepsiCo's Ethnic Advisory Board, which executives turn to for consulting on marketing, employment, health, environment, and procurement opportunities. Contreras-Sweet serves on the Milken Institute's California Advisory Board which studies key policy and economic topics that affect California's well-being.

Contreras-Sweet is an executive member of the Board of the Los Angeles Chamber of Commerce. In November 2017, Contreras-Sweet joined the LA-based Larta Institute as the first-ever to help champion and advance the commercialization of science. She is a member of the board of Children's Hospital Los Angeles. Contreras-Sweet served for 10 years as a board member and 2 years as the chairwoman of the Board of the Mexican American Opportunity Foundation (MAOF). She was appointed to the Board of the Los Angeles Fire and Police Pension Commission (LAFPP). She was a member of the Independent System Operator (ISO) executive board for California. She was a member of the Rebuild Los Angeles board, which was formed to provide economic development in the southern portion of Los Angeles after the 1992 Los Angeles riots.

Contreras-Sweet spearheaded the committee that produced the "Latinas: The Spirit of California" Exhibition featured at The California Museum for History, Women and the Arts.

In November 2017, Contreras-Sweet placed a $275 million bid on American film studio The Weinstein Company, after the studio's founder Harvey Weinstein was fired after dozens of women accused him of sexual abuse. Contreras-Sweet proposed turning The Weinstein Company into a female-led company. The studio was expected to file for Chapter 11 bankruptcy on February 26, 2018, before Contreras-Sweet's company reached a deal to purchase the company on March 1, 2018, for $500 million, including a $90 million victims compensation fund. On March 6, 2018, the acquisition deal collapsed after the studio had an extra debt of $50 million revealed.

Contreras-Sweet was awarded the honorary Doctor of Humane Letters (L.H.D.) from Whittier College in 2016.

Political offices
Preceded by Marianne Markowitz; Acting	Administrator of the Small Business Administration; 2014–2017	Succeeded by Joseph Loddo; Acting
