= Northeast Bank =

Financial institution in Maine

- Company type: Public
- Traded as: Nasdaq: NBN; Russell 2000 Component
- Industry: Banking and Investments
- Founded: Bethel, Maine, U.S. (1872)
- Headquarters: Portland, Maine, U.S.
- Number of locations: 12 Locations
- Area served: Maine, Massachusetts, New Hampshire
- Key people: Richard Wayne, CEO, Matthew Botein, Chairman,
- Products: Financial services
- Services: Financial services
- Total assets: US $2,174,402 on 6-30-2021
- Number of employees: 188
- Website: www.northeastbank.com

Northeast Bank is a Maine-based full-service financial institution. Their National Lending group ("National Lending") purchases and originates commercial loans on a nationwide basis while the Community Banking group ("Community Banking") offers personal and business banking services within Maine via nine branches. Additionally, ableBanking, a division of Northeast Bank, offers online savings products to consumers nationwide. Information regarding Northeast Bank can be found at www.northeastbank.com.

Northeast Bancorp was formed from the merger of Bethel Savings Bank and Brunswick Federal Savings in 1996.

== Lines of Business ==
Northeast Bank offers traditional personal and business banking services as well as the purchase and origination of commercial loans nationally.

=== National Lending ===
Northeast Bank originates and acquires commercial real estate loans on a nationwide basis. Business lines include: bridge lending, private lender finance, and secondary market loan acquisitions.

=== Community Banking ===
Through the Community Banking group, Northeast Bank offers personal banking products such as checking, savings, money market and other deposit accounts; as well as credit card accounts, residential mortgages, and personal loans. Northeast Bank also offers business banking products such as savings and deposit accounts, cash management products, business credit cards, and small business loans.

Online banking services are offered to both retail and commercial clients.

== History ==
=== Northeast Bank Predecessors ===
- Bethel Savings Bank, opened in 1872
- Bethel Bancorp created in 1987
- Brunswick Federal Savings Purchased in 1990
- Cushnoc Bank and Trust of Augusta Purchased in 1997
