= Karen Mills =

US businesswoman and administrator

Karen Gordon Mills
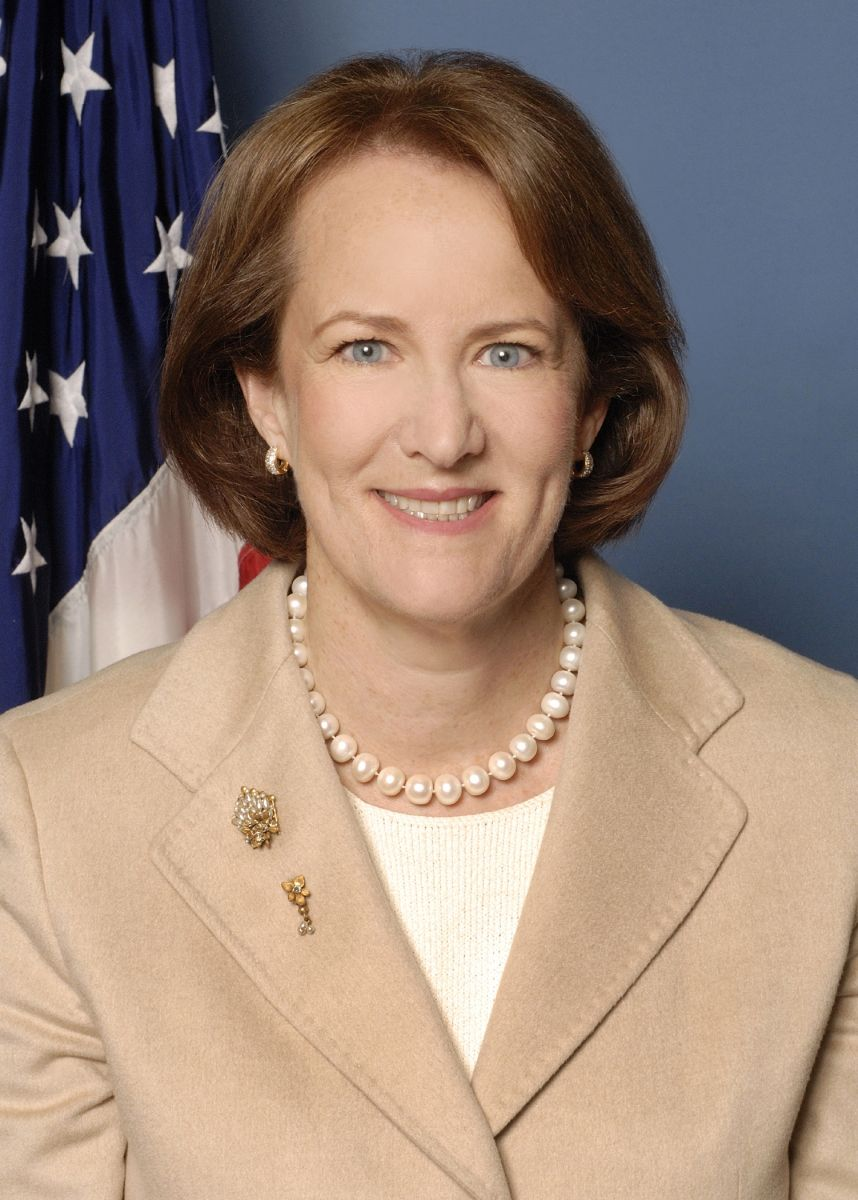
- Official portrait, 2009

23rd Administrator of the Small Business Administration
- In office April 6, 2009 – September 1, 2013
- President: Barack Obama
- Deputy: Marie Johns
- Preceded by: Steve Preston; Darryl Hairston (acting)
- Succeeded by: Maria Contreras-Sweet; Jeanne Hulit (acting)

Personal details
- Born: Karen Gordon; September 14, 1953 (age 72) Wellesley, Massachusetts, U.S.
- Party: Democratic
- Spouse: Barry Mills
- Education: Harvard University (BA, MBA)

Karen Gordon Mills (born September 14, 1953) is an American businessperson, author and former government official who served as the 23rd administrator of the U.S. Small Business Administration (SBA). She was nominated by President-elect Barack Obama on December 19, 2008, confirmed unanimously by the Senate on April 2, 2009, and sworn in on April 6, 2009. During her tenure, her office was elevated to the rank of Cabinet-level officer, expanding her power on policy decisions and granting her inclusion in the President's cabinet meetings. On February 11, 2013, she announced her resignation as Administrator and left the post on September 1, 2013.

After leaving the SBA, Mills served as a Senior Fellow at Harvard Business School and Harvard's John F. Kennedy School of Government. She is the president of the investment firm MMP Group, Inc., and has been a regular contributor to Fortune and other publications. She is the author of Fintech, Small Business & the American Dream, released in 2018, and released a second edition of the book in 2024.

== Early life and education ==
Mills is the daughter of Ellen (née Rubin), the CEO of Tootsie Roll since 2015, and Melvin Gordon, the president and CEO of Tootsie Roll Industries from 1962 until 2015. She received a Bachelor of Arts in economics from Harvard University and an MBA from Harvard Business School, where she was a Baker Scholar.

== Career ==
During the 1980s and 1990s, Mills invested in and managed several small manufacturing firms throughout the country, including producers of hardwood flooring, refrigerator motors, and plastic injection molding.

Before becoming SBA Administrator, Mills served as president of the private equity firm MMP Group, a firm focused on growing businesses in areas such as consumer products, food, textiles, and industrial components. Prior to MMP, she was a founding partner and managing director of Solera Capital, a venture capital firm based in New York City which invested in many women-owned firms, such as natural food producer Annie's.

In 2007, former Maine Governor John Baldacci appointed her to chair the state's Council on Competitiveness and the Economy, which was focused on rural and regional development. She also served on the state's Council for the Redevelopment of the Brunswick Naval Air Station.

Previously, she has worked as a management consultant in the US and Europe for McKinsey and Co., and as a product manager for General Foods, and has served on the boards of directors for Scotts Miracle-Gro and Arrow Electronics.

== Clustering ==
Mills is an advocate for regional innovation clusters—geographic groupings of related industries (such as tech companies in Silicon Valley) that can share resources, ideas, and human capital. In 2005, Mills became involved with the effort to create new jobs following the closing of the Brunswick Naval Air Station. She helped organize the North Star Alliance, a partnership between local boat builders, composite material manufacturers, and researchers at the University of Maine, which has helped increase the global competitiveness of Maine's boat building and composite industries.

She went on to organize the creation of a specialty foods cluster in Maine, with specialty producers, such as Peak Organic Beer, taking advantage of Maine's local agriculture. In 2007 she was appointed chair of Maine's Council on Competitiveness and the Economy, where she focused on attracting investment in regional industries and rural areas of Maine.

Drawing on her experience working with regional innovation clusters, Mills authored a paper on the subject for the Brookings Institution in April, 2008.

== US Small Business Administration ==
Created in 1953, the Small Business Administration operates in four key areas: expanding access to capital, increasing government contracting opportunities, entrepreneurial development, and disaster relief. The agency gained a higher profile under President Obama, who made small businesses a cornerstone of his effort to revive the economy in the wake of the Great Recession. Mills, a Democrat, was confirmed as Administrator of the SBA at a critical time in early 2009 when the small business lending market had ground to a halt, including SBA-backed lending. She oversaw implementation of key provisions of President Obama's American Recovery and Reinvestment Act of 2009, including the waiving of fees on SBA-backed loans and increasing the agency's government guarantee on loans made by private sector lenders. The impact of these provisions were immediate with average weekly loan volume increasing by more than 60 percent. Leveraging bipartisan support for America's small businesses, Mills led efforts for the passage of the Small Business Jobs Act of 2010, which was referred to at the time as the most significant piece of small business legislation in more than a decade. Among other things, the Act extended the successful Recovery Act loan provisions, raised the maximum size of SBA-guaranteed loans, expanded opportunities for small businesses competing for federal contracts, created the State Trade and Export grant program, provided $50 million in additional funding for Small Business Development Centers, and strengthened the agency's oversight and enforcement tools. Under Mills, SBA also launched the Impact Fund pilot program, under the agency's Small Business Investment Company program, with the goal of capitalizing investment funds that seek both financial and social return, as well as its first regional clusters initiative.

In January 2012, the position of Administrator of the SBA was elevated to the rank of Cabinet-level officer, expanding Mills' power on policy decisions and granting her access to cabinet meetings. On February 11, 2013, she announced that she would resign as Administrator of the SBA, with President Obama saying: "because of Karen's hard work and dedication, our small businesses are better positioned to create jobs and our entire economy is stronger." Mills left her position at SBA on September 1, 2013. She received praise for her leadership of the agency from the lending industry because of her work to tackle outdated regulations, bureaucracy and strengthening and simplifying the agency's core loan programs. During her tenure, the agency supported more than $106 billion in lending to more than 193,000 small businesses, including two record years of SBA-backed lending and three record years of investments made through the Small Business Investment Company program. Additionally, in federal fiscal years 2011–13, $286.3 billion in federal contracts were awarded to small businesses, which was $32 billion more than the three previous years.

== Post-SBA work ==
After leaving the SBA, Mills served as a Senior Fellow at the Harvard Business School and was previously a Senior Fellow at the Mossavar-Rahmani Center for Business and Government at the Harvard Kennedy School . In July 2014, she released The State of Small Business Lending: Credit Access During the Recovery and How Technology May Change the Game, which looked at the structural and cyclical contributors to the severity of the credit crunch following the 2008–2009 recession and the slow recovery of the small business lending markets. It also examined the rapid growth, trends and impact of online lenders focused on the small business market. In November 2016, she co-authored The State of Small Business Lending: Innovation and Technology and Implications for Regulation Additionally, at HBS she has contributed research and recommendations on the link between entrepreneurship and middle class opportunity, including in the September 2015 U.S. Competitiveness project reports The Challenge of Shared Prosperity and Growth and Shared Prosperity. In both reports she authored sections considering the impact of the declining rate of new business startups on issues like income inequality and economic mobility, and offered recommendations on how to increase startup rates through a combination of policies focused on access to capital, skills training and the creation of entrepreneurial ecosystems.

Mills is the author of Fintech, Small Business & the American Dream, published in 2018. Looking at the 2008-09 recession and the years following, Mills examines the economic importance of small businesses to the U.S. economy, their capital needs and how technology and artificial intelligence are transforming lending. In 2024, Mills published the second edition of Fintech, Small Business & the American Dream, with new content and focus on the economic impact of the COVID-19 pandemic on the small business economy, and the growth new financial products driven by artificial intelligence, data-powered algorithms to determine creditworthiness, and embedded technology. She is also a contributor to the 2021 book Big Data in Small Business: Data-Driven Growth in Small and Medium-Sized Enterprises. In 2022, she co-authored, along with Mercedes Delgado and J. Daniel Kim, the chapter "The Servicification of the U.S. Economy: The Role of Startups versus Incumbent Firms" in the book The Role of Innovation and Entrepreneurship in Economic Growth.

Mills is the vice chair of the board of directors of the National Bureau of Economic Research. She was a member of the Milstein Commission on Entrepreneurship and Middle Class Jobs at the University of Virginia's Miller Center and a contributor to the commission's January 2015 report Can Startups Save the American Dream? which proposed a series of "practical, meaningful measures that can generate consensus and advance America's startup community in service of the middle class." She previously served as chair of the advisory committee for the Private Capital Research Institute, co-Chair of the Bipartisan Policy Center's Main Street Finance Task Force, and as a member of the Milken Institute's Fintech Advisory Committee.

In 2013, Mills also returned to her position as president of MMP Group, Inc., a firm that has invested in businesses in consumer products and services, food, textiles, and industrial components. She is a member of the board of directors of Skillsoft and previously served as vice chairman of the board of the immigration services company Envoy Global. She also served on the board of the Maine Technology Institute, a nonprofit that invests in local technology companies and innovative small businesses. She is a member of the Council on Foreign Relations and previously served as a vice chairman of the Harvard Board of Overseers, the older, more consultative, and larger of the two Harvard governing bodies. In 2014, she was elected to fill a vacancy in the Harvard Corporation (made up of the President and Fellows of Harvard College), the University's smaller governing body that is its principal fiduciary authority. She is also the recipient of the U.S. Navy's Distinguished Public Service Award and a regular contributor to Fortune and other publications, writing primarily on the economy, small business and entrepreneurship.

== Published works ==
=== Books ===
- Fintech, Small Business & the American Dream (Second Edition) (Boston, MA: Palgrave Macmillan, 2024).
- The Role of Innovation and Entrepreneurship in Economic Growth, Michael J. Andrews, Aaron Chatterji, Josh Lerner, and Scott Stern, editors, (chapter) The Servicification of the U.S. Economy: The Role of Startups versus Incumbent Firms, Mercedes Delgado, J. Daniel Kim, Karen G. Mills, (University of Chicago Press, 2022)
- Big Data in Small Business: Data-Driven Growth in Small and Medium-Sized Enterprises (contributor) (Northampton, MA: Edward Elgar Publishing, 2021)
- Fintech, Small Business & the American Dream (Boston, MA: Palgrave Macmillan, 2018).

=== Papers ===
- The Supply Chain Economy: New Policies to Drive Innovation and Jobs, by Mercedes Delgado and Karen G. Mills (December 2021)
- Creating Smart Policy to Promote Entrepreneurship and Innovation, by Karen G. Mills and Annie Dang (May 19, 2020)
- A New Categorization of the U.S. Economy: The Role of Supply Chain Industries in Innovation and Economic Performance, by Mercedes Delgado and Karen G. Mills (October 9, 2017)
- The State of Small Business Lending: Innovation and Technology and Implications for Regulation, by Karen G. Mills and Brayden McCarthy (November 2017)
- Growth & Shared Prosperity, by Karen G. Mills, with Contributions from Joseph B. Fuller and Jan W. Rivkin (September 2015)
- The Challenge of Shared Prosperity, by Jan W. Rivkin, Karen G. Mills, and Michael E. Porter, with contributions from Michael I. Norton and Mitchell B. Weiss (September 2015)
- The State of Small Business Lending: Credit Access During the Recovery and How Technology May Change the Game, by Karen G. Mills and Brayden McCarthy (July 2014)
- Clusters and Competitiveness: A New Federal Role for Stimulating Economies, by Karen G. Mills, Andrew Reamer and Elisabeth B. Reynolds (April 2008)

== Personal life ==
She is married to Barry Mills, who served as president of Bowdoin College from October 2001 to July 2015, and has three sons.

Political offices
Preceded by Darryl Hairston; Acting	Administrator of the Small Business Administration; 2009–2013	Succeeded by Jeanne Hulit; Acting
