= Administrator of the Small Business Administration =

U.S. federal government official

Administrator of Small Business Administration
- Seal of the Small Business Administration

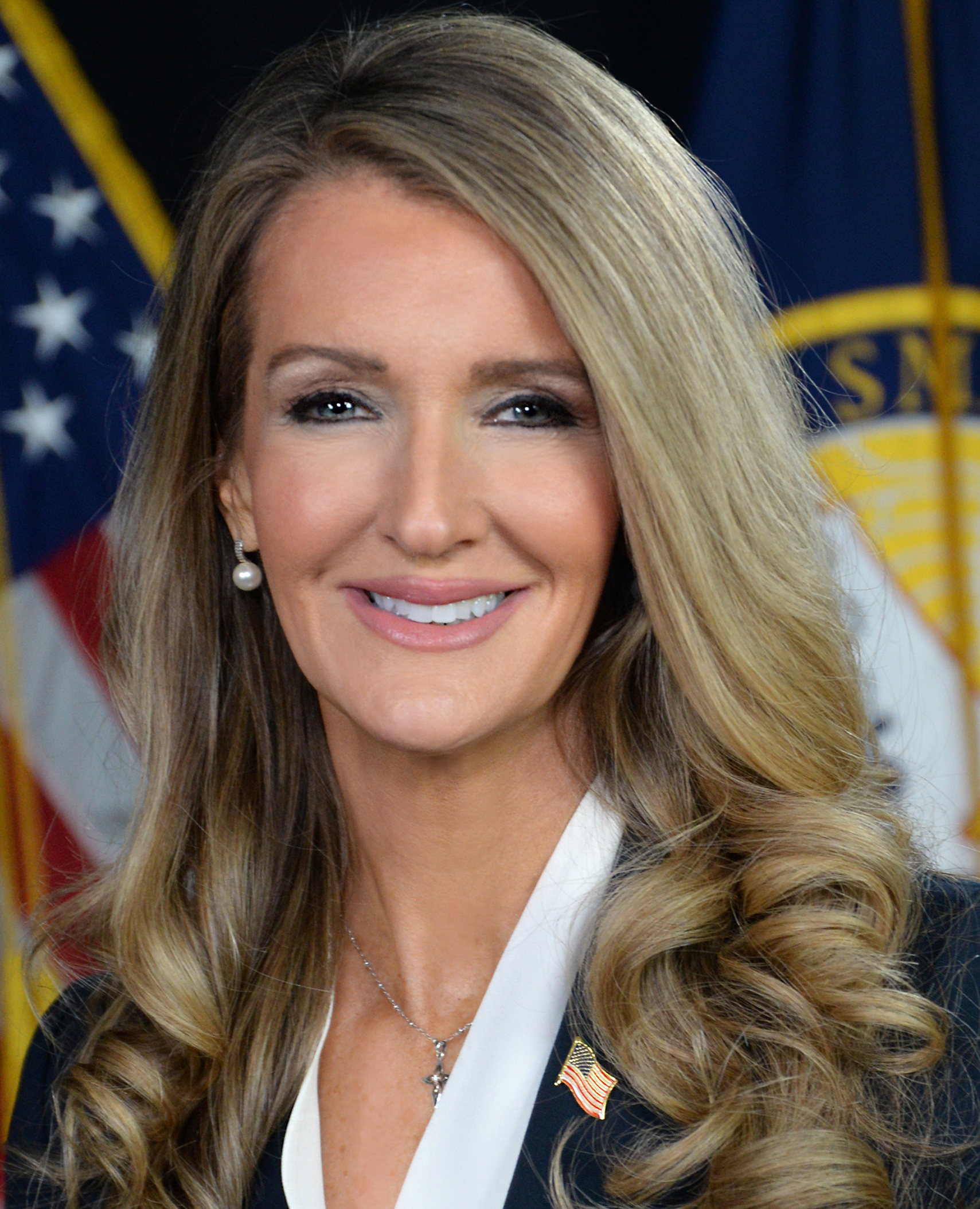
- Incumbent; Kelly Loeffler since February 20, 2025
- Small Business Administration
- Seat: 409 3rd Street SW, Washington, D.C. 20416
- Appointer: The president; with Senate advice and consent
- Term length: No fixed term
- Constituting instrument: 15 U.S.C. § 633
- Inaugural holder: William D. Mitchell
- Formation: July 30, 1953
- Deputy: Deputy Administrator
- Salary: Executive Schedule, level III
- Website: www.sba.gov

The administrator of the Small Business Administration is the head of the Small Business Administration of the United States. The administrator is responsible for managing and the day-to-day operations of the agency. The administrator is nominated by the president of the United States and must be confirmed by a vote of the United States Senate.

In January 2012, President Barack Obama announced that the SBA administrator would be elevated to Cabinet rank, a position it last held during the Clinton administration.

The most recent confirmed administrator was Kelly Loeffler, who was nominated by President Donald Trump and confirmed by the Senate on February 20, 2025.

== List of administrators ==
Denotes an acting administrator of the Small Business Administration

The following is a chronological list of those who have held the office:

No.	Image	Name	Start	End	Refs.	President(s)
1		William D. Mitchell	August 1, 1953	October 30, 1953		Dwight D. Eisenhower (1953–1961)
2		Wendell B. Barnes	February 9, 1954	November 21, 1959		Dwight D. Eisenhower (1953–1961)
3		Philip McCallum	November 23, 1959	January 20, 1961		Dwight D. Eisenhower (1953–1961)
4		John E. Horne	February 2, 1961	August 7, 1963		John F. Kennedy (1961–1963)
5		Eugene P. Foley	August 8, 1963	September 10, 1965		John F. Kennedy (1961–1963)
5		Eugene P. Foley	August 8, 1963	September 10, 1965		Lyndon B. Johnson (1963–1969)
6		Bernard L. Boutin	May 19, 1966	July 31, 1967		Lyndon B. Johnson (1963–1969)
7		Robert C. Moot	August 1, 1967	July 31, 1968		Lyndon B. Johnson (1963–1969)
8		Howard J. Samuels	August 1, 1968	February 22, 1969		Lyndon B. Johnson (1963–1969)
9		Hilary J. Sandoval Jr.	March 5, 1969	January 1, 1971		Richard Nixon (1969–1974)
10		Thomas S. Kleppe	January 18, 1971	October 12, 1975		Richard Nixon (1969–1974)
10		Thomas S. Kleppe	January 18, 1971	October 12, 1975		Gerald Ford (1974–1977)
11		Mitchell P. Kobelinski	February 12, 1976	March 4, 1977		Gerald Ford (1974–1977)
12		A. Vernon Weaver	April 1, 1977	January 20, 1981		Jimmy Carter (1977–1981)
13		Michael Cardenas	March 30, 1981	February 3, 1982		Ronald Reagan (1981–1989)
14		James C. Sanders	March 29, 1982	March 31, 1986		Ronald Reagan (1981–1989)
–		Charles Heatherly; Acting	March 31, 1986	March 23, 1987		Ronald Reagan (1981–1989)
15		James Abdnor	March 23, 1987	April 20, 1989		Ronald Reagan (1981–1989)
16		Susan Engeleiter	April 20, 1989	March 27, 1991		George H. W. Bush (1989–1993)
17		Pat Saiki	March 27, 1991	January 20, 1993		George H. W. Bush (1989–1993)
–		Dayton J. Watkins; Acting	January 20, 1993	May 12, 1993		Bill Clinton (1993–2001)
18		Erskine Bowles	May 12, 1993	October 6, 1994		Bill Clinton (1993–2001)
–		Cassandra M. Pulley; Acting	October 6, 1994	October 8, 1994		Bill Clinton (1993–2001)
19		Philip Lader	October 8, 1994	February 11, 1997		Bill Clinton (1993–2001)
–		Ginger Lew; Acting	February 11, 1997	March 7, 1997		Bill Clinton (1993–2001)
20		Aida Álvarez	March 7, 1997	January 20, 2001		Bill Clinton (1993–2001)
–		John D. Whitmore; Acting	January 20, 2001	July 25, 2001		George W. Bush (2001–2009)
21		Hector Barreto	July 25, 2001	July 2, 2006		George W. Bush (2001–2009)
22		Steve Preston	July 10, 2006	June 5, 2008		George W. Bush (2001–2009)
–		Sandy Baruah; Acting	June 5, 2008	January 20, 2009		George W. Bush (2001–2009)
–		Darryl Hairston; Acting	January 20, 2009	April 6, 2009		Barack Obama (2009–2017)
23		Karen Mills	April 6, 2009	September 1, 2013		Barack Obama (2009–2017)
–		Jeanne Hulit; Acting	September 1, 2013	February 7, 2014		Barack Obama (2009–2017)
–		Marianne Markowitz; Acting	February 7, 2014	April 7, 2014		Barack Obama (2009–2017)
24		Maria Contreras-Sweet	April 7, 2014	January 20, 2017		Barack Obama (2009–2017)
–		Joseph Loddo; Acting	January 20, 2017	February 14, 2017		Donald Trump (2017–2021)
25		Linda McMahon	February 14, 2017	April 12, 2019		Donald Trump (2017–2021)
–		Chris Pilkerton; Acting	April 13, 2019	January 14, 2020		Donald Trump (2017–2021)
26		Jovita Carranza	January 14, 2020	January 20, 2021		Donald Trump (2017–2021)
–		Tami Perriello; Acting	January 20, 2021	March 17, 2021		Joe Biden (2021–2025)
27		Isabel Guzman	March 17, 2021	January 20, 2025		Joe Biden (2021–2025)
–		Everett Woodel; Acting	January 20, 2025	February 20, 2025		Donald Trump (2025–present)
28		Kelly Loeffler	February 20, 2025	present		Donald Trump (2025–present)

== Line of succession ==
The line of succession for the administrator of the Small Business Administration is as follows:

1. Deputy Administrator
2. Chief of Staff
3. General Counsel
4. Associate Administrator; Office of Capital Access
5. Associate Administrator, Office of Disaster Assistance
6. Regional Administrator for Region IX (Phoenix, Arizona)
7. Regional Administrator for Region VIII (Denver, Colorado)
