= Cabinet of Joe Biden =

Biden Cabinet
- Cabinet of the United States
- 2021–2025
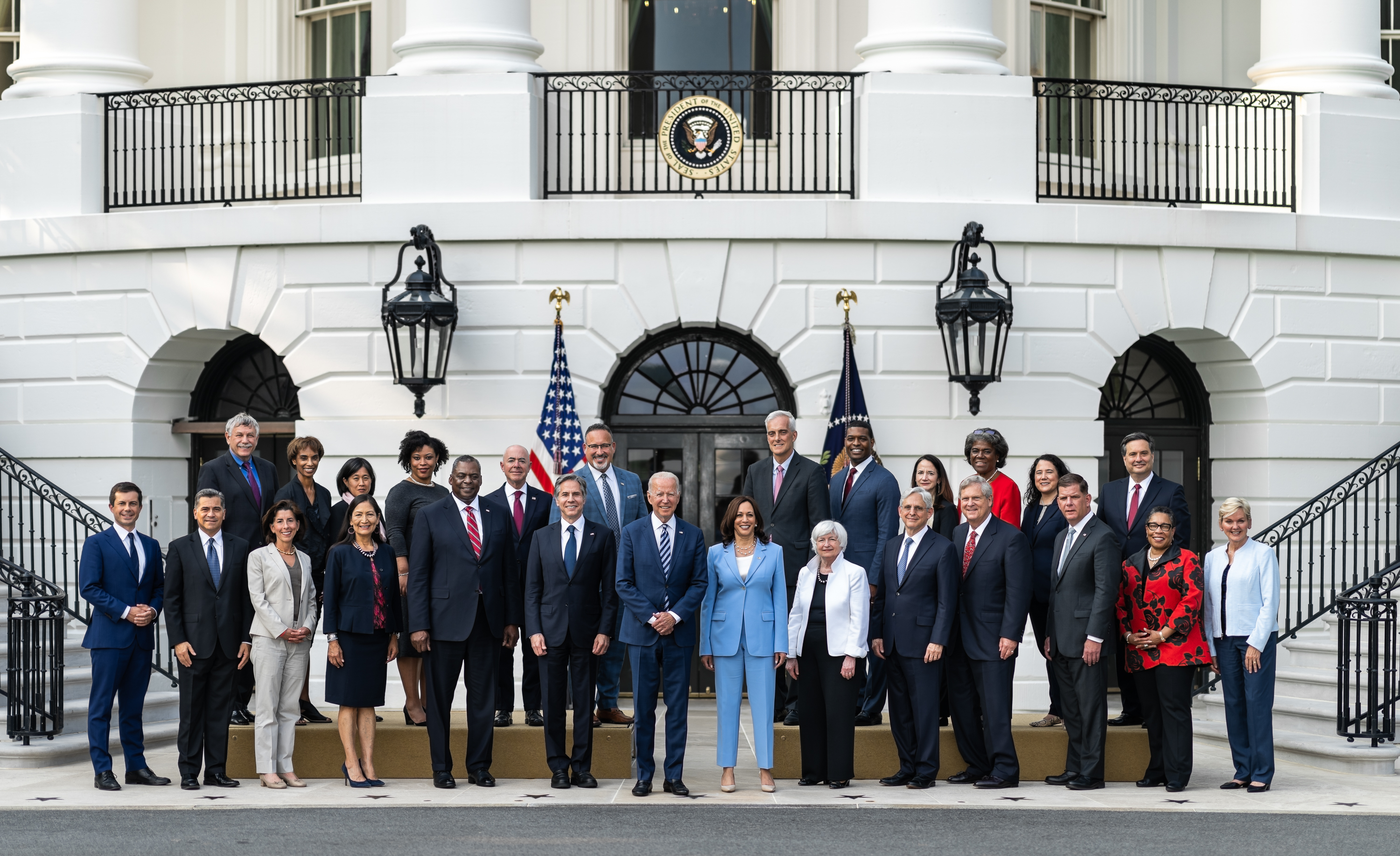
- Cabinet of President Joe Biden in July 2021
- Date formed: January 20, 2021
- Date dissolved: January 20, 2025

People and organizations
- President: Joe Biden
- President's history: Vice President (2009–2017); Senator from Delaware (1973–2009); New Castle County Councilman (1971–1973)
- Vice President: Kamala Harris
- Total no. of members: 25 (incl. Cabinet-level members)
- Member party: Democratic Party
- Status in legislature: Majority government (2021–2023); Divided government (2023–2025)
- Opposition party: Republican Party

History
- Election: 2020 presidential election
- Legislature terms: 117th Congress; 118th Congress; 119th Congress (17 days)
- Budgets: 2021 budget 2022 budget 2023 budget 2024 budget
- Advice and consent: United States Senate
- Predecessor: First Trump Cabinet
- Successor: Second Trump Cabinet

Joe Biden assumed office as the 46th president of the United States on January 20, 2021, and his term ended on January 20, 2025. The president has the authority to nominate members of his Cabinet to the United States Senate for confirmation under the Appointments Clause of the United States Constitution.

Before confirmation and during congressional hearings, a high-level career member of an executive department heads this pre-confirmed cabinet on an acting basis. The Cabinet's creation was part of the transition of power following the 2020 presidential election.

In addition to the 15 heads of executive departments, there are 10 Cabinet-level officials. Biden altered his cabinet structure, elevating the chair of the Council of Economic Advisers, director of the Office of Science and Technology Policy and ambassador to the United Nations as Cabinet-level positions. Biden initially removed the director of the Central Intelligence Agency from his Cabinet, but reversed the move in July 2023.

Confirmations had occurred at the slowest pace of any presidential cabinet in modern history that resulted from delays in facilitating an orderly transition of power and passing the organizing resolution for governing an evenly split Senate following the 2020–2021 United States Senate runoff elections in Georgia; and the second impeachment of Donald Trump. By March 2021, a pick-up in the first half of the month brought confirmations close to pace. Biden is the first president since Ronald Reagan in 1981 to have all of his original Cabinet secretary nominees confirmed to their posts.

This article documents the nomination and confirmation process for any successful or unsuccessful Cabinet nominees of the Biden administration. They are listed in order of creation of the Cabinet position (also used as the basis for the United States presidential line of succession)

== Cabinet ==
=== Cabinet officials on January 20, 2025 ===
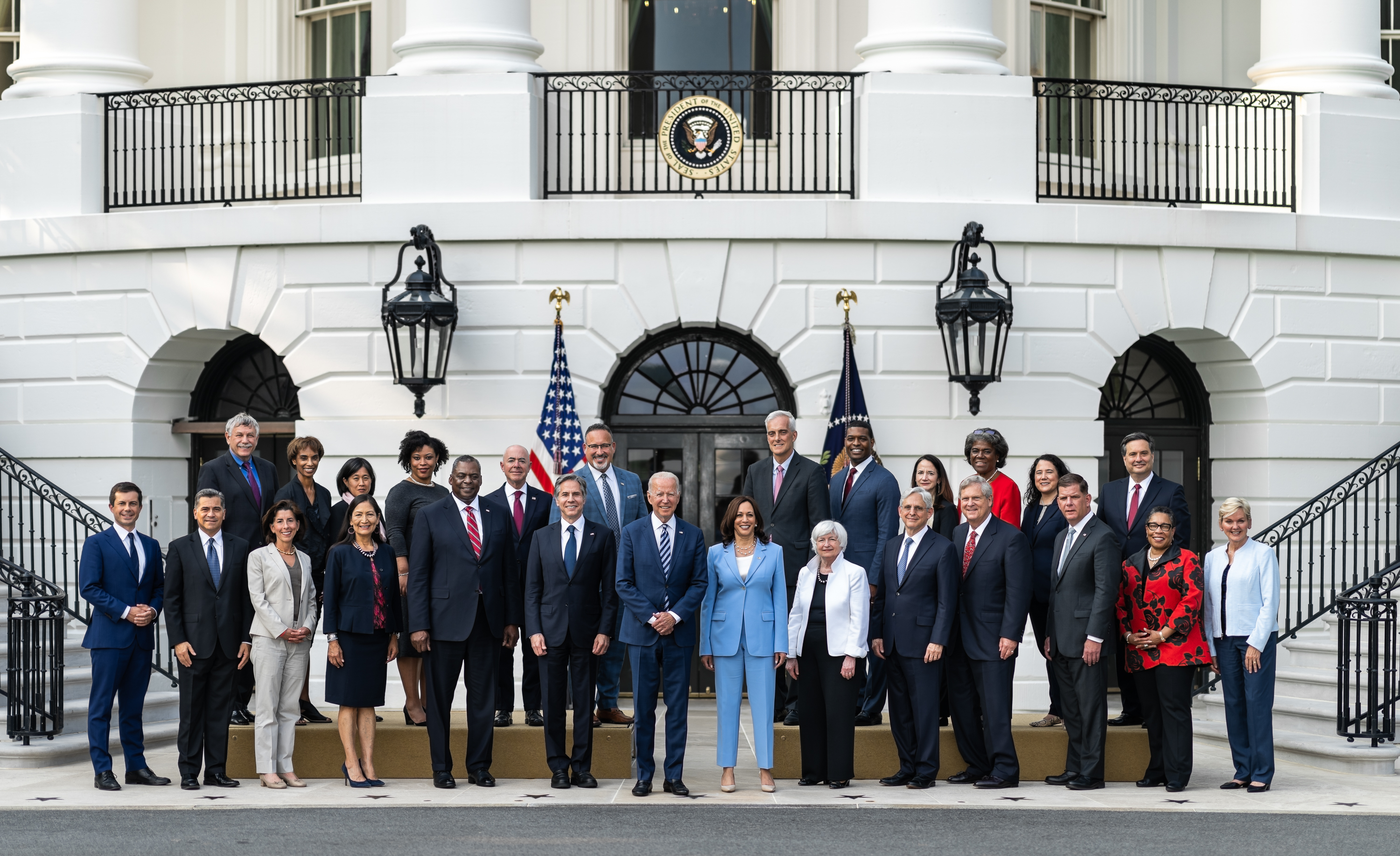

Biden cabinet
| Office | Name | Term |
| President | Joe Biden | 2021–2025 |
| Vice President | Kamala Harris | 2021–2025 |
| Secretary of State | Antony Blinken | 2021–2025 |
| Secretary of the Treasury | Janet Yellen | 2021–2025 |
| Secretary of Defense | Lloyd Austin | 2021–2025 |
| Attorney General | Merrick Garland | 2021–2025 |
| Secretary of the Interior | Deb Haaland | 2021–2025 |
| Secretary of Agriculture | Tom Vilsack | 2021–2025 |
| Secretary of Commerce | Gina Raimondo | 2021–2025 |
| Secretary of Labor | Marty Walsh | 2021–2023 |
| Julie Su (acting) | 2023–2025 |
| Secretary of Health and Human Services | Xavier Becerra | 2021–2025 |
| Secretary of Housing and Urban Development | Marcia Fudge | 2021–2024 |
| Adrianne Todman (acting) | 2024–2025 |
| Secretary of Transportation | Pete Buttigieg | 2021–2025 |
| Secretary of Energy | Jennifer Granholm | 2021–2025 |
| Secretary of Education | Miguel Cardona | 2021–2025 |
| Secretary of Veterans Affairs | Denis McDonough | 2021–2025 |
| Secretary of Homeland Security | Alejandro Mayorkas | 2021–2025 |
| Administrator of the Environmental Protection Agency | Michael S. Regan | 2021–2024 |
| Jane Nishida (acting) | 2025–2025 |
| Director of the Office of Management and Budget | Shalanda Young | 2021–2025 |
| Director of National Intelligence | Avril Haines | 2021–2025 |
| Director of the Central Intelligence Agency | William J. Burns* | 2021–2025 |
| United States Trade Representative | Katherine Tai | 2021–2025 |
| Ambassador to the United Nations | Linda Thomas-Greenfield | 2021–2025 |
| Chair of the Council of Economic Advisers | Cecilia Rouse | 2021–2023 |
| Jared Bernstein | 2023–2025 |
| Administrator of the Small Business Administration | Isabel Guzman | 2021–2025 |
| Director of the Office of Science and Technology Policy | Eric Lander | 2021–2022 |
| Arati Prabhakar | 2022–2025 |
| White House Chief of Staff | Ron Klain | 2021–2023 |
| Jeff Zients | 2023–2025 |
- *Elevated to cabinet-level in July 2023

All permanent members of the Cabinet of the United States as heads of executive departments require the advice and consent of the United States Senate following appointment by the president before taking office. The vice presidency is exceptional in that the position requires an election to office pursuant to the United States Constitution. The president may also designate heads of other agencies and non-Senate-confirmed members of the Executive Office of the President as Cabinet-level members of the Cabinet. The Cabinet meets with the president in the Cabinet Room, a room adjacent to the Oval Office. During some cabinet meetings First Lady Jill Biden participated.

The following were the final members of President Joe Biden's Cabinet on January 20, 2025.

Cabinet of President Joe Biden
Elected to office – all other cabinet members serve at the pleasure of the president Serving in an acting capacity No Senate consent needed
| Office Date announced/confirmed | Designee | Office Date announced/confirmed | Designee |
| Vice President; Announced August 11, 2020; Elected November 3, 2020; Assumed office January 20, 2021 | U.S. Senator; Kamala Harris from California | Secretary of State; Announced November 23, 2020; Assumed office January 26, 2021 | Former Deputy Secretary; Antony Blinken from New York |
| Secretary of the Treasury; Announced November 30, 2020; Assumed office January 26, 2021 | Former Federal Reserve Chair; Janet Yellen from California | Secretary of Defense; Announced December 8, 2020; Assumed office January 22, 2021 | Retired General; Lloyd Austin from Georgia |
| Attorney General; Announced January 7, 2021; Assumed office March 11, 2021 | D.C. Circuit Judge; Merrick Garland from Maryland | Secretary of the Interior; Announced December 17, 2020; Assumed office March 16, 2021 | U.S. Representative; Deb Haaland from New Mexico |
| Secretary of Agriculture; Announced December 10, 2020; Assumed office February 24, 2021 | Former Secretary; Tom Vilsack from Iowa | Secretary of Commerce; Announced January 7, 2021; Assumed office March 3, 2021 | Governor; Gina Raimondo of Rhode Island |
| Secretary of Labor; Assumed acting office March 11, 2023 | Deputy Secretary; Julie Su from California | Secretary of Health and Human Services; Announced December 7, 2020; Assumed office March 19, 2021 | Attorney General; Xavier Becerra of California |
| Secretary of Housing and Urban Development; Assumed acting office March 22, 2024 | Deputy Secretary; Adrianne Todman from the U.S. Virgin Islands | Secretary of Transportation; Announced December 15, 2020; Assumed office February 3, 2021 | Former Mayor; Pete Buttigieg from Indiana |
| Secretary of Energy; Announced December 17, 2020; Assumed office February 25, 2021 | Former Governor; Jennifer Granholm of Michigan | Secretary of Education; Announced December 22, 2020; Assumed office March 2, 2021 | State Education Commissioner; Miguel Cardona of Connecticut |
| Secretary of Veterans Affairs; Announced December 10, 2020; Assumed office February 9, 2021 | Former White House Chief of Staff; Denis McDonough from Maryland | Secretary of Homeland Security; Announced November 23, 2020; Assumed office February 2, 2021 | Former Deputy Secretary; Alejandro Mayorkas from the District of Columbia |
=== Cabinet-level officials ===
| Office Date announced/confirmed | Designee | Office Date announced/confirmed | Designee |
| White House Chief of Staff; Announced January 22, 2023; Assumed office February 8, 2023 | Director of the Office of Management and Budget; Jeff Zients from the District of Columbia | Administrator of the Environmental Protection Agency; Assumed acting office January 1, 2025 | Assistant Administrator of the EPA for International and Tribal Affairs; Jane Nishida of Maryland |
| Director of the Office of Management and Budget; Announced March 2, 2021 (acting as deputy); Assumed office March 24, 2021 (acting as deputy); Announced November 24, 2021 (director); Assumed office March 17, 2022 (director) | Deputy Director; Shalanda Young from Louisiana | Director of National Intelligence; Announced November 23, 2020; Assumed office January 21, 2021 | Former Deputy National Security Advisor; Avril Haines from New York |
| Director of the Central Intelligence Agency; Announced January 11, 2021; Assumed office March 19, 2021; Elevated July 21, 2023 | Former Deputy Secretary of State; William J. Burns from North Carolina | United States Trade Representative; Announced December 10, 2020; Assumed office March 18, 2021 | Chief Trade Counsel of the House Ways and Means Committee; Katherine Tai from the District of Columbia |
| Ambassador to the United Nations; Announced November 23, 2020; Assumed office February 25, 2021 | Former Assistant Secretary of State for African Affairs; Linda Thomas-Greenfield from Louisiana | Chair of the Council of Economic Advisers; Announced February 14, 2023; Assumed office July 10, 2023 | Member of the Council of Economic Advisers; Jared Bernstein from Virginia |
| Administrator of the Small Business Administration; Announced January 7, 2021; Assumed office March 17, 2021 | Director of the State Office of Small Business Advocate; Isabel Guzman of California | Science Advisor to the President; Director of the Office of Science and Technology Policy; Announced June 21, 2022; Assumed office October 3, 2022 | Former Director of DARPA; Arati Prabhakar from California |

=== Confirmation process ===
Below is a list of confirmations for Cabinet positions, Cabinet-level positions, and other significant positions that were approved through the Senate from January 2021 onwards, by a recorded roll-call vote, rather than by a voice vote.

==== Confirmation votes ====
For Comparison:

Senate confirmation votes of President Joe Biden's cabinet

| State | Senator | Party | Jan 20, 2021 Avril Haines Intelligence 84–10 | Jan 22, 2021 Lloyd Austin Defense 93–2 | Jan 25, 2021 Janet Yellen Treasury 84–15 | Jan 26, 2021 Antony Blinken State 78–22 | Feb 2, 2021 Pete Buttigieg Transport 86–13 | Feb 2, 2021 Alejandro Mayorkas Homeland 56–43 | Feb 8, 2021 Denis McDonough Veterans 87–7 | Feb 23, 2021 Linda Thomas- Greenfield UN 78–20 |
|---|---|---|---|---|---|---|---|---|---|---|
| Alabama | Richard Shelby | R | Yea | Yea | Nay | Nay | Nay | Nay | Yea | Nay |
| Alabama | Tommy Tuberville | R | Yea | Yea | Nay | Nay | Nay | Nay | Yea | Nay |
| Alaska | Lisa Murkowski | R | Yea | Yea | Yea | Yea | Yea | Yea | Yea | Yea |
| Alaska | Dan Sullivan | R | Yea | Yea | Nay | Yea | Yea | Yea | Yea | Yea |
| Arizona | Kyrsten Sinema | D | Yea | Yea | Yea | Yea | Yea | Yea | Yea | Yea |
| Arizona | Mark Kelly | D | Yea | Yea | Yea | Yea | Yea | Yea | Yea | Yea |
| Arkansas | John Boozman | R | Yea | Yea | Nay | Nay | Yea | Nay | Yea | Yea |
| Arkansas | Tom Cotton | R | Yea | Yea | Nay | Nay | Nay | Nay | Nay | Nay |
| California | Dianne Feinstein | D | Yea | Yea | Yea | Yea | Yea | Yea | Yea | Yea |
| California | Alex Padilla | D | Yea | Yea | Yea | Yea | Yea | Yea | Yea | Yea |
| Colorado | Michael Bennet | D | Yea | Yea | Yea | Yea | Yea | Yea | Yea | Yea |
| Colorado | John Hickenlooper | D | Yea | Yea | Yea | Yea | Yea | Yea | Yea | Yea |
| Connecticut | Richard Blumenthal | D | Yea | Yea | Yea | Yea | Yea | Yea | Yea | Yea |
| Connecticut | Chris Murphy | D | Yea | Yea | Yea | Yea | Yea | Yea | Yea | Yea |
| Delaware | Tom Carper | D | Yea | Yea | Yea | Yea | Yea | Yea | Yea | Yea |
| Delaware | Chris Coons | D | Yea | Yea | Yea | Yea | Yea | Yea | Yea | Yea |
| Florida | Marco Rubio | R | Yea | Yea | No vote | Yea | Nay | Nay | Yea | Nay |
| Florida | Rick Scott | R | Yea | Yea | Nay | Nay | Nay | Nay | Nay | Nay |
| Georgia | Jon Ossoff | D | Yea | Yea | Yea | Yea | Yea | Yea | Yea | Yea |
| Georgia | Raphael Warnock | D | Yea | Yea | Yea | Yea | Yea | Yea | Yea | Yea |
| Hawaii | Brian Schatz | D | Yea | Yea | Yea | Yea | Yea | Yea | Yea | Yea |
| Hawaii | Mazie Hirono | D | Yea | Yea | Yea | Yea | Yea | Yea | Yea | Yea |
| Idaho | Mike Crapo | R | No vote | Yea | Yea | Yea | Yea | Nay | Yea | Yea |
| Idaho | Jim Risch | R | Nay | Yea | Nay | Yea | Yea | Nay | Yea | Yea |
| Illinois | Dick Durbin | D | Yea | Yea | Yea | Yea | Yea | Yea | Yea | Yea |
| Illinois | Tammy Duckworth | D | Yea | Yea | Yea | Yea | Yea | Yea | Yea | Yea |
| Indiana | Todd Young | R | Yea | Yea | Yea | Yea | Yea | Nay | Yea | Yea |
| Indiana | Mike Braun | R | Nay | Yea | Yea | Nay | Yea | Nay | Yea | Nay |
| Iowa | Chuck Grassley | R | Yea | Yea | Yea | Yea | Yea | Nay | Yea | Nay |
| Iowa | Joni Ernst | R | Nay | Yea | Yea | Nay | Yea | Nay | Nay | Nay |
| Kansas | Jerry Moran | R | Yea | No vote | Yea | Yea | Yea | Nay | No vote | Yea |
| Kansas | Roger Marshall | R | Nay | Yea | Yea | Nay | Nay | Nay | Nay | Nay |
| Kentucky | Mitch McConnell | R | Yea | Yea | Yea | Yea | Yea | Nay | Yea | Yea |
| Kentucky | Rand Paul | R | Nay | Yea | Nay | Nay | Yea | Nay | No vote | No vote |
| Louisiana | Bill Cassidy | R | Yea | Yea | Yea | Nay | Nay | Nay | Yea | Yea |
| Louisiana | John Kennedy | R | Yea | Yea | Yea | Nay | Yea | Nay | Yea | Yea |
| Maine | Susan Collins | R | Yea | Yea | Yea | Yea | Yea | Yea | Yea | Yea |
| Maine | Angus King | I-D | Yea | Yea | Yea | Yea | Yea | Yea | Yea | Yea |
| Maryland | Ben Cardin | D | Yea | Yea | Yea | Yea | Yea | Yea | Yea | Yea |
| Maryland | Chris Van Hollen | D | Yea | Yea | Yea | Yea | Yea | Yea | Yea | Yea |
| Massachusetts | Elizabeth Warren | D | Yea | Yea | Yea | Yea | Yea | Yea | Yea | Yea |
| Massachusetts | Ed Markey | D | Yea | Yea | Yea | Yea | Yea | Yea | Yea | Yea |
| Michigan | Debbie Stabenow | D | Yea | Yea | Yea | Yea | Yea | Yea | Yea | Yea |
| Michigan | Gary Peters | D | Yea | Yea | Yea | Yea | Yea | Yea | Yea | Yea |
| Minnesota | Amy Klobuchar | D | Yea | Yea | Yea | Yea | Yea | Yea | Yea | Yea |
| Minnesota | Tina Smith | D | Yea | Yea | Yea | Yea | Yea | Yea | Yea | Yea |
| Mississippi | Roger Wicker | R | Yea | Yea | Yea | Yea | Yea | Nay | Yea | Yea |
| Mississippi | Cindy Hyde-Smith | R | Yea | No vote | Yea | Yea | Yea | Nay | Yea | Yea |
| Missouri | Roy Blunt | R | Yea | Yea | Yea | Yea | Yea | Nay | Yea | Yea |
| Missouri | Josh Hawley | R | Nay | Nay | Nay | Nay | Nay | Nay | Nay | Nay |
| Montana | Jon Tester | D | Yea | Yea | Yea | Yea | Yea | Yea | Yea | Yea |
| Montana | Steve Daines | R | Yea | Yea | Yea | Nay | Yea | Nay | Yea | Nay |
| Nebraska | Deb Fischer | R | Yea | Yea | Yea | Yea | Yea | Nay | Yea | Yea |
| Nebraska | Ben Sasse | R | Yea | Yea | Yea | Yea | Yea | Nay | Yea | Nay |
| Nevada | Catherine Cortez Masto | D | Yea | Yea | Yea | Yea | Yea | Yea | Yea | Yea |
| Nevada | Jacky Rosen | D | Yea | Yea | Yea | Yea | Yea | Yea | Yea | Yea |
| New Hampshire | Jeanne Shaheen | D | Yea | Yea | Yea | Yea | Yea | Yea | Yea | Yea |
| New Hampshire | Maggie Hassan | D | Yea | Yea | Yea | Yea | Yea | Yea | Yea | Yea |
| New Jersey | Bob Menendez | D | Yea | Yea | Yea | Yea | Yea | Yea | Yea | Yea |
| New Jersey | Cory Booker | D | Yea | Yea | Yea | Yea | Yea | Yea | Yea | Yea |
| New Mexico | Martin Heinrich | D | Yea | Yea | Yea | Yea | Yea | Yea | Yea | Yea |
| New Mexico | Ben Ray Luján | D | Yea | Yea | Yea | Yea | Yea | Yea | Yea | Yea |
| New York | Chuck Schumer | D | Yea | Yea | Yea | Yea | Yea | Yea | Yea | Yea |
| New York | Kirsten Gillibrand | D | Yea | Yea | Yea | Yea | Yea | Yea | Yea | Yea |
| North Carolina | Richard Burr | R | Yea | No vote | Yea | Yea | Yea | Nay | No vote | Yea |
| North Carolina | Thom Tillis | R | No vote | No vote | Yea | Yea | Yea | Nay | Yea | Yea |
| North Dakota | John Hoeven | R | Yea | Yea | Nay | Nay | Yea | Nay | Yea | Nay |
| North Dakota | Kevin Cramer | R | Yea | Yea | Nay | Nay | Yea | Nay | Yea | Nay |
| Ohio | Sherrod Brown | D | No vote | Yea | Yea | Yea | Yea | Yea | Yea | Yea |
| Ohio | Rob Portman | R | Yea | Yea | Yea | Yea | Yea | Yea | Yea | Yea |
| Oklahoma | Jim Inhofe | R | Yea | Yea | Yea | Yea | Yea | Nay | No vote | Yea |
| Oklahoma | James Lankford | R | Yea | Yea | Yea | Nay | Nay | Nay | Yea | Nay |
| Oregon | Ron Wyden | D | Yea | Yea | Yea | Yea | Yea | Yea | Yea | Yea |
| Oregon | Jeff Merkley | D | Yea | Yea | Yea | Yea | Yea | Yea | Yea | Yea |
| Pennsylvania | Bob Casey Jr. | D | Yea | Yea | Yea | Yea | Yea | Yea | Yea | Yea |
| Pennsylvania | Pat Toomey | R | No vote | Yea | Yea | Yea | No vote | No vote | No vote | No vote |
| Rhode Island | Jack Reed | D | Yea | Yea | Yea | Yea | Yea | Yea | Yea | Yea |
| Rhode Island | Sheldon Whitehouse | D | No vote | Yea | Yea | Yea | Yea | Yea | Yea | Yea |
| South Carolina | Lindsey Graham | R | Yea | Yea | Yea | Yea | Yea | Nay | Yea | Yea |
| South Carolina | Tim Scott | R | No vote | Yea | Yea | Nay | Nay | Nay | Yea | Nay |
| South Dakota | John Thune | R | Yea | Yea | Yea | Yea | Yea | Nay | Yea | Yea |
| South Dakota | Mike Rounds | R | Yea | Yea | Yea | Yea | Yea | Nay | Yea | Yea |
| Tennessee | Marsha Blackburn | R | Nay | Yea | Nay | Nay | Nay | Nay | Yea | Nay |
| Tennessee | Bill Hagerty | R | Nay | Yea | Yea | Yea | Nay | Nay | Nay | Nay |
| Texas | John Cornyn | R | Yea | Yea | Yea | Yea | Yea | Nay | Yea | Yea |
| Texas | Ted Cruz | R | Nay | Yea | Nay | Nay | Nay | Nay | Nay | Nay |
| Utah | Mike Lee | R | Nay | Nay | Nay | Nay | Yea | Nay | Yea | Yea |
| Utah | Mitt Romney | R | Yea | Yea | Yea | Yea | Yea | Yea | Yea | Yea |
| Vermont | Patrick Leahy | D | Yea | Yea | Yea | Yea | Yea | Yea | Yea | Yea |
| Vermont | Bernie Sanders | I-D | Yea | Yea | Yea | Yea | Yea | Yea | Yea | Yea |
| Virginia | Mark Warner | D | Yea | Yea | Yea | Yea | Yea | Yea | Yea | Yea |
| Virginia | Tim Kaine | D | Yea | Yea | Yea | Yea | Yea | Yea | Yea | Yea |
| Washington | Patty Murray | D | Yea | Yea | Yea | Yea | Yea | Yea | Yea | Yea |
| Washington | Maria Cantwell | D | Yea | Yea | Yea | Yea | Yea | Yea | Yea | Yea |
| West Virginia | Joe Manchin | D | Yea | Yea | Yea | Yea | Yea | Yea | Yea | Yea |
| West Virginia | Shelley Moore Capito | R | Yea | No vote | Yea | Yea | Yea | Yea | Yea | Yea |
| Wisconsin | Ron Johnson | R | Yea | Yea | Yea | Yea | Yea | Nay | Yea | Yea |
| Wisconsin | Tammy Baldwin | D | Yea | Yea | Yea | Yea | Yea | Yea | Yea | Yea |
| Wyoming | John Barrasso | R | Yea | Yea | Nay | Nay | Yea | Nay | No vote | Nay |
| Wyoming | Cynthia Lummis | R | Yea | Yea | Yea | Nay | Yea | Nay | Yea | Yea |
| | vote by party | D Ind. R | 46–0 (2 NV); 2–0; 36–10 (4 NV); Haines | 48–0; 2–0; 43–2 (5 NV); Austin | 48–0; 2–0; 34–15 (1 NV); Yellen | 48–0; 2–0; 28–22; Blinken | 48–0; 2–0; 36–13 (1 NV); Buttigieg | 48–0; 2–0; 6–43 (1 NV); Mayorkas | 48–0; 2–0; 37–7 (6 NV); McDonough | 48–0; 2–0; 28–20 (2 NV); Thomas-Greenfield |

| State | Senator | Party | Feb 23, 2021 Tom Vilsack Agriculture 92–7 | Feb 25, 2021 Jennifer Granholm Energy 64–35 | Mar 1, 2021 Miguel Cardona Education 64–33 | Mar 2, 2021 Gina Raimondo Commerce 84–15 | Mar 2, 2021 Cecilia Rouse CEA 95–4 | Mar 10, 2021 Marcia Fudge HUD 66–34 | Mar 10, 2021 Merrick Garland Justice 70–30 | Mar 10, 2021 Michael Regan EPA 66–34 |
|---|---|---|---|---|---|---|---|---|---|---|
| Alabama | Richard Shelby | R | Yea | Nay | Nay | Nay | Yea | Nay | Nay | Nay |
| Alabama | Tommy Tuberville | R | Yea | Nay | Nay | Nay | Nay | Nay | Nay | Nay |
| Alaska | Lisa Murkowski | R | Yea | Yea | Yea | Yea | Yea | Yea | Yea | Yea |
| Alaska | Dan Sullivan | R | Nay | No vote | Nay | Yea | Yea | Yea | Nay | Nay |
| Arizona | Kyrsten Sinema | D | Yea | Yea | Yea | Yea | Yea | Yea | Yea | Yea |
| Arizona | Mark Kelly | D | Yea | Yea | Yea | Yea | Yea | Yea | Yea | Yea |
| Arkansas | John Boozman | R | Yea | Nay | Nay | Yea | Yea | Nay | Nay | Nay |
| Arkansas | Tom Cotton | R | Yea | Nay | Nay | Nay | Nay | Nay | Nay | Nay |
| California | Dianne Feinstein | D | Yea | Yea | Yea | Yea | Yea | Yea | Yea | Yea |
| California | Alex Padilla | D | Yea | Yea | Yea | Yea | Yea | Yea | Yea | Yea |
| Colorado | Michael Bennet | D | Yea | Yea | Yea | Yea | Yea | Yea | Yea | Yea |
| Colorado | John Hickenlooper | D | Yea | Yea | Yea | Yea | Yea | Yea | Yea | Yea |
| Connecticut | Richard Blumenthal | D | Yea | Yea | Yea | Yea | Yea | Yea | Yea | Yea |
| Connecticut | Chris Murphy | D | Yea | Yea | Yea | Yea | Yea | Yea | Yea | Yea |
| Delaware | Tom Carper | D | Yea | Yea | Yea | Yea | Yea | Yea | Yea | Yea |
| Delaware | Chris Coons | D | Yea | Yea | Yea | Yea | Yea | Yea | Yea | Yea |
| Florida | Marco Rubio | R | Nay | Nay | Yea | Nay | Yea | Nay | Nay | Yea |
| Florida | Rick Scott | R | Nay | Nay | Nay | Nay | Nay | Nay | Nay | Nay |
| Georgia | Jon Ossoff | D | Yea | Yea | Yea | Yea | Yea | Yea | Yea | Yea |
| Georgia | Raphael Warnock | D | Yea | Yea | Yea | Yea | Yea | Yea | Yea | Yea |
| Hawaii | Brian Schatz | D | Yea | Yea | Yea | Yea | Yea | Yea | Yea | Yea |
| Hawaii | Mazie Hirono | D | Yea | Yea | Yea | Yea | Yea | Yea | Yea | Yea |
| Idaho | Mike Crapo | R | Yea | Yea | Nay | Yea | Yea | Nay | Nay | Nay |
| Idaho | Jim Risch | R | Yea | Yea | Nay | Yea | Yea | Nay | Nay | Nay |
| Illinois | Dick Durbin | D | Yea | Yea | Yea | Yea | Yea | Yea | Yea | Yea |
| Illinois | Tammy Duckworth | D | Yea | Yea | Yea | Yea | Yea | Yea | Yea | Yea |
| Indiana | Todd Young | R | Yea | Yea | Nay | Yea | Yea | Yea | Nay | Nay |
| Indiana | Mike Braun | R | Yea | Nay | Nay | Yea | Yea | Nay | Nay | Yea |
| Iowa | Chuck Grassley | R | Yea | Nay | Yea | Yea | Yea | Yea | Yea | Yea |
| Iowa | Joni Ernst | R | Yea | Nay | Nay | Yea | Yea | Nay | Yea | Nay |
| Kansas | Jerry Moran | R | Yea | Nay | No vote | Yea | Yea | Yea | Yea | Nay |
| Kansas | Roger Marshall | R | Yea | Nay | Nay | Yea | Yea | Nay | Nay | Nay |
| Kentucky | Mitch McConnell | R | Yea | Yea | Yea | Yea | Yea | Yea | Yea | Nay |
| Kentucky | Rand Paul | R | Nay | Nay | Nay | Yea | Nay | Nay | Nay | Nay |
| Louisiana | Bill Cassidy | R | Yea | Nay | Yea | Yea | Yea | Nay | Yea | Nay |
| Louisiana | John Kennedy | R | Yea | Nay | Nay | Nay | Yea | Nay | Nay | Nay |
| Maine | Susan Collins | R | Yea | Yea | Yea | Yea | Yea | Yea | Yea | Yea |
| Maine | Angus King | I-D | Yea | Yea | Yea | Yea | Yea | Yea | Yea | Yea |
| Maryland | Ben Cardin | D | Yea | Yea | Yea | Yea | Yea | Yea | Yea | Yea |
| Maryland | Chris Van Hollen | D | Yea | Yea | Yea | Yea | Yea | Yea | Yea | Yea |
| Massachusetts | Elizabeth Warren | D | Yea | Yea | Yea | Yea | Yea | Yea | Yea | Yea |
| Massachusetts | Ed Markey | D | Yea | Yea | Yea | Yea | Yea | Yea | Yea | Yea |
| Michigan | Debbie Stabenow | D | Yea | Yea | Yea | Yea | Yea | Yea | Yea | Yea |
| Michigan | Gary Peters | D | Yea | Yea | Yea | Yea | Yea | Yea | Yea | Yea |
| Minnesota | Amy Klobuchar | D | Yea | Yea | Yea | Yea | Yea | Yea | Yea | Yea |
| Minnesota | Tina Smith | D | Yea | Yea | Yea | Yea | Yea | Yea | Yea | Yea |
| Mississippi | Roger Wicker | R | Yea | Nay | Nay | Yea | Yea | Nay | Nay | Yea |
| Mississippi | Cindy Hyde-Smith | R | Yea | Nay | Nay | Yea | Yea | Nay | Nay | Yea |
| Missouri | Roy Blunt | R | Yea | Nay | No vote | Yea | Yea | Yea | Yea | Nay |
| Missouri | Josh Hawley | R | Nay | Nay | Nay | Nay | Yea | Nay | Nay | Nay |
| Montana | Jon Tester | D | Yea | Yea | Yea | Yea | Yea | Yea | Yea | Yea |
| Montana | Steve Daines | R | Yea | Yea | Nay | Yea | Yea | Nay | Nay | Nay |
| Nebraska | Deb Fischer | R | Yea | Nay | Yea | Yea | Yea | Nay | Nay | Yea |
| Nebraska | Ben Sasse | R | Yea | Nay | Nay | Nay | Yea | Nay | Nay | Nay |
| Nevada | Catherine Cortez Masto | D | Yea | Yea | Yea | Yea | Yea | Yea | Yea | Yea |
| Nevada | Jacky Rosen | D | Yea | Yea | Yea | Yea | Yea | Yea | Yea | Yea |
| New Hampshire | Jeanne Shaheen | D | No vote | Yea | Yea | Yea | Yea | Yea | Yea | Yea |
| New Hampshire | Maggie Hassan | D | Yea | Yea | Yea | Yea | Yea | Yea | Yea | Yea |
| New Jersey | Bob Menendez | D | Yea | Yea | Yea | Yea | Yea | Yea | Yea | Yea |
| New Jersey | Cory Booker | D | Yea | Yea | Yea | Yea | Yea | Yea | Yea | Yea |
| New Mexico | Martin Heinrich | D | Yea | Yea | Yea | Yea | Yea | Yea | Yea | Yea |
| New Mexico | Ben Ray Luján | D | Yea | Yea | Yea | Yea | Yea | Yea | Yea | Yea |
| New York | Chuck Schumer | D | Yea | Yea | Yea | Yea | Yea | Yea | Yea | Yea |
| New York | Kirsten Gillibrand | D | Yea | Yea | Yea | Yea | Yea | Yea | Yea | Yea |
| North Carolina | Richard Burr | R | Yea | Yea | Yea | Yea | Yea | Nay | Yea | Yea |
| North Carolina | Thom Tillis | R | Yea | Nay | Yea | Yea | Yea | Nay | Yea | Yea |
| North Dakota | John Hoeven | R | Yea | Yea | Nay | Nay | Yea | Yea | Nay | Nay |
| North Dakota | Kevin Cramer | R | Yea | Yea | Nay | Nay | Yea | Yea | Nay | Yea |
| Ohio | Sherrod Brown | D | Yea | Yea | Yea | Yea | Yea | Yea | Yea | Yea |
| Ohio | Rob Portman | R | Yea | Yea | Yea | Yea | Yea | Yea | Yea | Yea |
| Oklahoma | Jim Inhofe | R | Yea | Nay | Nay | Yea | Yea | Nay | Yea | Nay |
| Oklahoma | James Lankford | R | Yea | Nay | Nay | Yea | Yea | Nay | Yea | Nay |
| Oregon | Ron Wyden | D | Yea | Yea | Yea | Yea | Yea | Yea | Yea | Yea |
| Oregon | Jeff Merkley | D | Yea | Yea | Yea | Yea | Yea | Yea | Yea | Yea |
| Pennsylvania | Bob Casey Jr. | D | Yea | Yea | Yea | Yea | Yea | Yea | Yea | Yea |
| Pennsylvania | Pat Toomey | R | Yea | Nay | Nay | Yea | Yea | Nay | Nay | Nay |
| Rhode Island | Jack Reed | D | Yea | Yea | Yea | Yea | Yea | Yea | Yea | Yea |
| Rhode Island | Sheldon Whitehouse | D | Yea | Yea | Yea | Yea | Yea | Yea | Yea | Yea |
| South Carolina | Lindsey Graham | R | Yea | Nay | Nay | Yea | Yea | Yea | Yea | Yea |
| South Carolina | Tim Scott | R | Yea | Nay | Nay | Nay | Yea | Yea | Nay | Nay |
| South Dakota | John Thune | R | Yea | Nay | Nay | Yea | Yea | Nay | Yea | Nay |
| South Dakota | Mike Rounds | R | Yea | Yea | Nay | Yea | Yea | Yea | Yea | Yea |
| Tennessee | Marsha Blackburn | R | Yea | Nay | No vote | No vote | No vote | Nay | Nay | Nay |
| Tennessee | Bill Hagerty | R | Yea | Nay | Nay | Nay | Yea | Nay | Nay | Nay |
| Texas | John Cornyn | R | Yea | Nay | Yea | Yea | Yea | Nay | Yea | Nay |
| Texas | Ted Cruz | R | Nay | Nay | Nay | Nay | Yea | Nay | Nay | Nay |
| Utah | Mike Lee | R | Yea | Nay | Nay | Yea | Yea | Nay | Nay | Yea |
| Utah | Mitt Romney | R | Yea | Yea | Yea | Yea | Yea | Yea | Yea | Yea |
| Vermont | Patrick Leahy | D | Yea | Yea | Yea | Yea | Yea | Yea | Yea | Yea |
| Vermont | Bernie Sanders | I-D | Nay | Yea | Yea | Yea | Yea | Yea | Yea | Yea |
| Virginia | Mark Warner | D | Yea | Yea | Yea | Yea | Yea | Yea | Yea | Yea |
| Virginia | Tim Kaine | D | Yea | Yea | Yea | Yea | Yea | Yea | Yea | Yea |
| Washington | Patty Murray | D | Yea | Yea | Yea | Yea | Yea | Yea | Yea | Yea |
| Washington | Maria Cantwell | D | Yea | Yea | Yea | Yea | Yea | Yea | Yea | Yea |
| West Virginia | Joe Manchin | D | Yea | Yea | Yea | Yea | Yea | Yea | Yea | Yea |
| West Virginia | Shelley Moore Capito | R | Yea | Nay | Yea | Yea | Yea | Yea | Yea | Nay |
| Wisconsin | Ron Johnson | R | Yea | Yea | Yea | Yea | Yea | Nay | Yea | Nay |
| Wisconsin | Tammy Baldwin | D | Yea | Yea | Yea | Yea | Yea | Yea | Yea | Yea |
| Wyoming | John Barrasso | R | Yea | Nay | Nay | Nay | Yea | Nay | Nay | Nay |
| Wyoming | Cynthia Lummis | R | Yea | Nay | Nay | Nay | Yea | Nay | Nay | Nay |
| | vote by party | D Ind. R | 47–0 (1 NV); 1–1; 44–6; Vilsack | 48–0; 2–0; 14–35 (1 NV); Granholm | 48–0; 2–0; 14–33 (3 NV); Cardona | 48–0; 2–0; 34–15 (1 NV); Raimondo | 48–0; 2–0; 45–4 (1 NV); Rouse | 48–0; 2–0; 16–34; Fudge | 48–0; 2–0; 20–30; Garland | 48–0; 2–0; 16–34; Regan |

| State | Senator | Party | Mar 15, 2021 Deb Haaland Interior 51–40 | Mar 16, 2021 Isabel Guzman SBA 81–17 | Mar 17, 2021 Katherine Tai Trade 98–0 | Mar 18, 2021 Xavier Becerra Health 50–49 | Mar 22, 2021 Marty Walsh Labor 68–29 | May 28, 2021 Eric Lander OSTP Voice vote | Mar 15, 2022 Shalanda Young OMB 61–36 | Sept 22, 2022 Arati Prabhakar OSTP 56–40 |
|---|---|---|---|---|---|---|---|---|---|---|
| Alabama | Richard Shelby | R | Nay | Yea | Yea | Nay | Nay | No vote | Yea | Nay |
| Alabama | Tommy Tuberville | R | Nay | Nay | Yea | Nay | Yea | No vote | Nay | Nay |
| Alaska | Lisa Murkowski | R | Yea | Yea | Yea | Nay | No vote | No vote | Yea | Yea |
| Alaska | Dan Sullivan | R | Yea | Yea | Yea | Nay | Yea | No vote | Yea | Nay |
| Arizona | Kyrsten Sinema | D | Yea | Yea | Yea | Yea | Yea | No vote | Yea | Yea |
| Arizona | Mark Kelly | D | Yea | Yea | Yea | Yea | Yea | No vote | Yea | Yea |
| Arkansas | John Boozman | R | Nay | Nay | Yea | Nay | Nay | No vote | Nay | Nay |
| Arkansas | Tom Cotton | R | Nay | Nay | Yea | Nay | Nay | No vote | Nay | Nay |
| California | Dianne Feinstein | D | Yea | Yea | Yea | Yea | Yea | No vote | No vote | Yea |
| California | Alex Padilla | D | Yea | Yea | Yea | Yea | Yea | No vote | Yea | Yea |
| Colorado | Michael Bennet | D | No vote | Yea | Yea | Yea | Yea | No vote | Yea | Yea |
| Colorado | John Hickenlooper | D | No vote | Yea | Yea | Yea | Yea | No vote | Yea | Yea |
| Connecticut | Richard Blumenthal | D | Yea | Yea | Yea | Yea | Yea | No vote | Yea | Yea |
| Connecticut | Chris Murphy | D | Yea | Yea | Yea | Yea | Yea | No vote | Yea | Yea |
| Delaware | Tom Carper | D | Yea | Yea | Yea | Yea | Yea | No vote | Yea | Yea |
| Delaware | Chris Coons | D | Yea | Yea | Yea | Yea | Yea | No vote | Yea | Yea |
| Florida | Marco Rubio | R | No vote | Nay | Yea | Nay | Nay | No vote | Nay | Nay |
| Florida | Rick Scott | R | Nay | Nay | Yea | Nay | Nay | No vote | Nay | Nay |
| Georgia | Jon Ossoff | D | Yea | Yea | Yea | Yea | Yea | No vote | Yea | Yea |
| Georgia | Raphael Warnock | D | Yea | Yea | Yea | Yea | Yea | No vote | Yea | Yea |
| Hawaii | Brian Schatz | D | Yea | Yea | Yea | Yea | Yea | No vote | Yea | Yea |
| Hawaii | Mazie Hirono | D | No vote | No vote | No vote | No vote | Yea | No vote | Yea | Yea |
| Idaho | Mike Crapo | R | Nay | Nay | Yea | Nay | Nay | No vote | Nay | No vote |
| Idaho | Jim Risch | R | Nay | Nay | Yea | Nay | Nay | No vote | Nay | Nay |
| Illinois | Dick Durbin | D | Yea | Yea | Yea | Yea | Yea | No vote | Yea | Yea |
| Illinois | Tammy Duckworth | D | Yea | Yea | Yea | Yea | Yea | No vote | No vote | Yea |
| Indiana | Todd Young | R | Nay | Yea | Yea | Nay | Nay | No vote | Nay | Nay |
| Indiana | Mike Braun | R | Nay | Nay | Yea | Nay | Nay | No vote | Nay | Nay |
| Iowa | Chuck Grassley | R | Nay | Yea | Yea | Nay | Yea | No vote | Yea | Nay |
| Iowa | Joni Ernst | R | Nay | Yea | Yea | Nay | Nay | No vote | Nay | Nay |
| Kansas | Jerry Moran | R | Nay | Yea | Yea | Nay | Nay | No vote | Nay | Yea |
| Kansas | Roger Marshall | R | No vote | Yea | Yea | Nay | Yea | No vote | Nay | Nay |
| Kentucky | Mitch McConnell | R | Nay | Yea | Yea | Nay | Nay | No vote | Nay | Nay |
| Kentucky | Rand Paul | R | Nay | Yea | Yea | Nay | Nay | No vote | Nay | Nay |
| Louisiana | Bill Cassidy | R | Nay | Yea | Yea | Nay | Yea | No vote | Yea | Yea |
| Louisiana | John Kennedy | R | Nay | Nay | Yea | Nay | Nay | No vote | Yea | Nay |
| Maine | Susan Collins | R | Yea | Yea | Yea | Yea | Yea | No vote | Yea | Yea |
| Maine | Angus King | I-D | Yea | Yea | Yea | Yea | Yea | No vote | Yea | Yea |
| Maryland | Ben Cardin | D | Yea | Yea | Yea | Yea | Yea | No vote | Yea | Yea |
| Maryland | Chris Van Hollen | D | Yea | Yea | Yea | Yea | Yea | No vote | Yea | Yea |
| Massachusetts | Elizabeth Warren | D | Yea | Yea | Yea | Yea | Yea | No vote | Yea | Yea |
| Massachusetts | Ed Markey | D | Yea | Yea | Yea | Yea | Yea | No vote | Yea | Yea |
| Michigan | Debbie Stabenow | D | Yea | Yea | Yea | Yea | Yea | No vote | Yea | Yea |
| Michigan | Gary Peters | D | Yea | Yea | Yea | Yea | Yea | No vote | Yea | Yea |
| Minnesota | Amy Klobuchar | D | Yea | Yea | Yea | Yea | Yea | No vote | Yea | Yea |
| Minnesota | Tina Smith | D | Yea | Yea | Yea | Yea | Yea | No vote | Yea | Yea |
| Mississippi | Roger Wicker | R | Nay | Yea | Yea | Nay | Nay | No vote | Yea | Nay |
| Mississippi | Cindy Hyde-Smith | R | Nay | Yea | Yea | Nay | Nay | No vote | Yea | Nay |
| Missouri | Roy Blunt | R | Nay | Yea | Yea | Nay | Yea | No vote | Yea | Yea |
| Missouri | Josh Hawley | R | Nay | Nay | Yea | Nay | Nay | No vote | Nay | Nay |
| Montana | Jon Tester | D | Yea | Yea | Yea | Yea | Yea | No vote | Yea | Yea |
| Montana | Steve Daines | R | Nay | Nay | Yea | Nay | Nay | No vote | Nay | Nay |
| Nebraska | Deb Fischer | R | Nay | Yea | Yea | Nay | Yea | No vote | Nay | Nay |
| Nebraska | Ben Sasse | R | Nay | Nay | Yea | Nay | Nay | No vote | Nay | Nay |
| Nevada | Catherine Cortez Masto | D | Yea | Yea | Yea | Yea | Yea | No vote | Yea | Yea |
| Nevada | Jacky Rosen | D | Yea | Yea | Yea | Yea | Yea | No vote | Yea | Yea |
| New Hampshire | Jeanne Shaheen | D | Yea | Yea | Yea | Yea | Yea | No vote | No vote | Yea |
| New Hampshire | Maggie Hassan | D | Yea | Yea | Yea | Yea | Yea | No vote | Yea | Yea |
| New Jersey | Bob Menendez | D | Yea | Yea | Yea | Yea | Yea | No vote | Yea | Yea |
| New Jersey | Cory Booker | D | Yea | Yea | Yea | Yea | Yea | No vote | Yea | Yea |
| New Mexico | Martin Heinrich | D | Yea | Yea | Yea | Yea | Yea | No vote | Yea | No vote |
| New Mexico | Ben Ray Luján | D | Yea | Yea | Yea | Yea | Yea | No vote | Yea | Yea |
| New York | Chuck Schumer | D | Yea | Yea | Yea | Yea | Yea | No vote | Yea | Yea |
| New York | Kirsten Gillibrand | D | Yea | Yea | Yea | Yea | Yea | No vote | Yea | Yea |
| North Carolina | Richard Burr | R | Nay | Yea | Yea | Nay | Yea | No vote | Yea | Yea |
| North Carolina | Thom Tillis | R | Nay | Yea | Yea | Nay | Yea | No vote | Nay | Yea |
| North Dakota | John Hoeven | R | Nay | Yea | Yea | Nay | Yea | No vote | Yea | Nay |
| North Dakota | Kevin Cramer | R | Nay | Yea | Yea | Nay | Yea | No vote | Yea | Nay |
| Ohio | Sherrod Brown | D | Yea | Yea | Yea | Yea | Yea | No vote | Yea | Yea |
| Ohio | Rob Portman | R | Nay | Yea | Yea | Nay | Yea | No vote | Nay | Yea |
| Oklahoma | Jim Inhofe | R | Nay | Yea | Yea | Nay | Nay | No vote | Nay | Nay |
| Oklahoma | James Lankford | R | Nay | Yea | Yea | Nay | Nay | No vote | Nay | Nay |
| Oregon | Ron Wyden | D | Yea | Yea | Yea | Yea | Yea | No vote | Yea | Yea |
| Oregon | Jeff Merkley | D | Yea | Yea | Yea | Yea | Yea | No vote | Yea | Yea |
| Pennsylvania | Bob Casey Jr. | D | Yea | Yea | Yea | Yea | Yea | No vote | Yea | Yea |
| Pennsylvania | Pat Toomey | R | No vote | Yea | Yea | Nay | No vote | No vote | Nay | Nay |
| Rhode Island | Jack Reed | D | Yea | Yea | Yea | Yea | Yea | No vote | Yea | Yea |
| Rhode Island | Sheldon Whitehouse | D | Yea | Yea | Yea | Yea | Yea | No vote | Yea | Yea |
| South Carolina | Lindsey Graham | R | Yea | Yea | Yea | Nay | Yea | No vote | Yea | Nay |
| South Carolina | Tim Scott | R | Nay | Nay | Yea | Nay | Nay | No vote | Nay | Nay |
| South Dakota | John Thune | R | Nay | Yea | Yea | Nay | Nay | No vote | Nay | Nay |
| South Dakota | Mike Rounds | R | Nay | Yea | Yea | Nay | Nay | No vote | Nay | Yea |
| Tennessee | Marsha Blackburn | R | Nay | Nay | Yea | Nay | No vote | No vote | Nay | Nay |
| Tennessee | Bill Hagerty | R | No vote | Nay | Yea | Nay | Nay | No vote | Nay | Nay |
| Texas | John Cornyn | R | Nay | Yea | Yea | Nay | Yea | No vote | Nay | Nay |
| Texas | Ted Cruz | R | Nay | Nay | Yea | Nay | Nay | No vote | Nay | Nay |
| Utah | Mike Lee | R | Nay | Nay | Yea | Nay | Yea | No vote | Nay | Nay |
| Utah | Mitt Romney | R | Nay | Yea | Yea | Nay | Yea | No vote | Nay | Nay |
| Vermont | Patrick Leahy | D | Yea | Yea | Yea | Yea | Yea | No vote | Yea | Yea |
| Vermont | Bernie Sanders | I-D | Yea | Yea | No vote | Yea | Yea | No vote | Yea | Yea |
| Virginia | Mark Warner | D | Yea | Yea | Yea | Yea | Yea | No vote | Yea | Yea |
| Virginia | Tim Kaine | D | Yea | Yea | Yea | Yea | Yea | No vote | Yea | Yea |
| Washington | Patty Murray | D | Yea | Yea | Yea | Yea | Yea | No vote | Yea | No vote |
| Washington | Maria Cantwell | D | Yea | Yea | Yea | Yea | Yea | No vote | Yea | Yea |
| West Virginia | Joe Manchin | D | Yea | Yea | Yea | Yea | Yea | No vote | Yea | Nay |
| West Virginia | Shelley Moore Capito | R | Nay | Yea | Yea | Nay | Yea | No vote | Nay | Nay |
| Wisconsin | Ron Johnson | R | Nay | Yea | Yea | Nay | Nay | No vote | Nay | Nay |
| Wisconsin | Tammy Baldwin | D | Yea | Yea | Yea | Yea | Yea | No vote | Yea | No vote |
| Wyoming | John Barrasso | R | No vote | Yea | Yea | Nay | Nay | No vote | Nay | Nay |
| Wyoming | Cynthia Lummis | R | No vote | No vote | Yea | Nay | Nay | No vote | Nay | Yea |
| | vote by party | D Ind. R | 45–0 (3 NV); 2–0; 4–40 (6 NV); Haaland | 47–0 (1 NV); 2–0; 32–17 (1 NV); Guzman | 47–0 (1 NV); 1–0 (1 NV); 50–0; Tai | 47–0 (1 NV); 2–0; 1–49; Becerra | 48–0; 2–0; 18–29 (3 NV); Walsh | (48 NV) (2 NV) (50 NV); Lander | 45–0 (3 NV); 2–0; 14–36; Young | 44–1 (3 NV); 2–0; 10–39 (1 NV); Prabhakar |

| State | Senator | Party | June 13, 2023 Jared Bernstein CEA 50–49 | Summary of votes cast by senators | | | |
| State | Senator | Party | June 13, 2023 Jared Bernstein CEA 50–49 | Congress | Yea | Did not vote | Nay |
|---|---|---|---|---|---|---|---|
| Alabama | Richard Shelby | R | — | 117th | 8 | 1 | 15 |
| Alabama | Katie Britt | R | Nay | 118th | 0 | 0 | 1 |
| Alabama | Tommy Tuberville | R | No vote | 117th ｜ 118th | 6 | 2 | 17 |
| Alaska | Lisa Murkowski | R | Nay | 117th ｜ 118th | 21 | 2 | 12 |
| Alaska | Dan Sullivan | R | Nay | 117th ｜ 118th | 15 | 2 | 8 |
| Arizona | Kyrsten Sinema | I-D | Yea | 117th ｜ 118th | 24 | 1 | 0 |
| Arizona | Mark Kelly | D | Yea | 117th ｜ 118th | 24 | 1 | 0 |
| Arkansas | John Boozman | R | Nay | 117th ｜ 118th | 9 | 1 | 15 |
| Arkansas | Tom Cotton | R | Nay | 117th ｜ 118th | 4 | 1 | 20 |
| California | Dianne Feinstein | D | Yea | 117th ｜ 118th | 23 | 2 | 0 |
| California | Alex Padilla | D | Yea | 117th ｜ 118th | 24 | 1 | 0 |
| Colorado | Michael Bennet | D | Yea | 117th ｜ 118th | 23 | 2 | 0 |
| Colorado | John Hickenlooper | D | Yea | 117th ｜ 118th | 23 | 2 | 0 |
| Connecticut | Richard Blumenthal | D | Yea | 117th ｜ 118th | 24 | 1 | 0 |
| Connecticut | Chris Murphy | D | Yea | 117th ｜ 118th | 24 | 1 | 0 |
| Delaware | Tom Carper | D | Yea | 117th ｜ 118th | 24 | 1 | 0 |
| Delaware | Chris Coons | D | Yea | 117th ｜ 118th | 24 | 1 | 0 |
| Florida | Marco Rubio | R | Nay | 117th ｜ 118th | 8 | 3 | 14 |
| Florida | Rick Scott | R | Nay | 117th ｜ 118th | 3 | 1 | 21 |
| Georgia | Jon Ossoff | D | Yea | 117th ｜ 118th | 24 | 1 | 0 |
| Georgia | Raphael Warnock | D | Yea | 117th ｜ 118th | 24 | 1 | 0 |
| Hawaii | Brian Schatz | D | Yea | 117th ｜ 118th | 24 | 1 | 0 |
| Hawaii | Mazie Hirono | D | Yea | 117th ｜ 118th | 20 | 5 | 0 |
| Idaho | Mike Crapo | R | Nay | 117th ｜ 118th | 11 | 3 | 11 |
| Idaho | Jim Risch | R | Nay | 117th ｜ 118th | 10 | 1 | 14 |
| Illinois | Dick Durbin | D | Yea | 117th ｜ 118th | 24 | 1 | 0 |
| Illinois | Tammy Duckworth | D | Yea | 117th ｜ 118th | 23 | 2 | 0 |
| Indiana | Todd Young | R | Nay | 117th ｜ 118th | 14 | 1 | 10 |
| Indiana | Mike Braun | R | Nay | 117th ｜ 118th | 9 | 1 | 15 |
| Iowa | Chuck Grassley | R | Nay | 117th ｜ 118th | 17 | 1 | 7 |
| Iowa | Joni Ernst | R | Nay | 117th ｜ 118th | 9 | 1 | 15 |
| Kansas | Jerry Moran | R | Nay | 117th ｜ 118th | 13 | 4 | 8 |
| Kansas | Roger Marshall | R | Nay | 117th ｜ 118th | 8 | 2 | 15 |
| Kentucky | Mitch McConnell | R | Nay | 117th ｜ 118th | 16 | 1 | 8 |
| Kentucky | Rand Paul | R | Nay | 117th ｜ 118th | 5 | 3 | 17 |
| Louisiana | Bill Cassidy | R | Nay | 117th ｜ 118th | 15 | 1 | 9 |
| Louisiana | John Kennedy | R | Nay | 117th ｜ 118th | 10 | 1 | 14 |
| Maine | Susan Collins | R | Nay | 117th ｜ 118th | 23 | 1 | 1 |
| Maine | Angus King | I-D | Yea | 117th ｜ 118th | 24 | 1 | 0 |
| Maryland | Ben Cardin | D | Yea | 117th ｜ 118th | 24 | 1 | 0 |
| Maryland | Chris Van Hollen | D | Yea | 117th ｜ 118th | 24 | 1 | 0 |
| Massachusetts | Elizabeth Warren | D | Yea | 117th ｜ 118th | 24 | 1 | 0 |
| Massachusetts | Ed Markey | D | Yea | 117th ｜ 118th | 24 | 1 | 0 |
| Michigan | Debbie Stabenow | D | Yea | 117th ｜ 118th | 24 | 1 | 0 |
| Michigan | Gary Peters | D | Yea | 117th ｜ 118th | 24 | 1 | 0 |
| Minnesota | Amy Klobuchar | D | Yea | 117th ｜ 118th | 24 | 1 | 0 |
| Minnesota | Tina Smith | D | Yea | 117th ｜ 118th | 24 | 1 | 0 |
| Mississippi | Roger Wicker | R | Nay | 117th ｜ 118th | 14 | 1 | 10 |
| Mississippi | Cindy Hyde-Smith | R | Nay | 117th ｜ 118th | 13 | 2 | 10 |
| Missouri | Roy Blunt | R | — | 117th | 17 | 2 | 5 |
| Missouri | Eric Schmitt | R | Nay | 118th | 0 | 0 | 1 |
| Missouri | Josh Hawley | R | Nay | 117th ｜ 118th | 2 | 1 | 22 |
| Montana | Jon Tester | D | Yea | 117th ｜ 118th | 24 | 1 | 0 |
| Montana | Steve Daines | R | Nay | 117th ｜ 118th | 10 | 1 | 14 |
| Nebraska | Deb Fischer | R | Nay | 117th ｜ 118th | 15 | 1 | 9 |
| Nebraska | Ben Sasse | R | — | 117th ｜ 118th | 9 | 1 | 14 |
| Nebraska | Pete Ricketts | R | Nay | 118th | 0 | 0 | 1 |
| Nevada | Catherine Cortez Masto | D | Yea | 117th ｜ 118th | 24 | 1 | 0 |
| Nevada | Jacky Rosen | D | Yea | 117th ｜ 118th | 24 | 1 | 0 |
| New Hampshire | Jeanne Shaheen | D | Yea | 117th ｜ 118th | 22 | 3 | 0 |
| New Hampshire | Maggie Hassan | D | Yea | 117th ｜ 118th | 24 | 1 | 0 |
| New Jersey | Bob Menendez | D | Yea | 117th ｜ 118th | 24 | 1 | 0 |
| New Jersey | Cory Booker | D | Yea | 117th ｜ 118th | 24 | 1 | 0 |
| New Mexico | Martin Heinrich | D | Yea | 117th ｜ 118th | 23 | 2 | 0 |
| New Mexico | Ben Ray Luján | D | Yea | 117th ｜ 118th | 24 | 1 | 0 |
| New York | Chuck Schumer | D | Yea | 117th ｜ 118th | 24 | 1 | 0 |
| New York | Kirsten Gillibrand | D | Yea | 117th ｜ 118th | 24 | 1 | 0 |
| North Carolina | Richard Burr | R | — | 117th | 17 | 3 | 4 |
| North Carolina | Ted Budd | R | Nay | 118th | 0 | 0 | 1 |
| North Carolina | Thom Tillis | R | Nay | 117th ｜ 118th | 15 | 3 | 7 |
| North Dakota | John Hoeven | R | Nay | 117th ｜ 118th | 12 | 1 | 12 |
| North Dakota | Kevin Cramer | R | Nay | 117th ｜ 118th | 13 | 1 | 11 |
| Ohio | Sherrod Brown | D | Yea | 117th ｜ 118th | 23 | 2 | 0 |
| Ohio | Rob Portman | R | — | 117th | 20 | 1 | 3 |
| Ohio | JD Vance | R | Nay | 118th | 0 | 0 | 1 |
| Oklahoma | Jim Inhofe | R | — | 117th | 12 | 2 | 10 |
| Oklahoma | Markwayne Mullin | R | Nay | 118th | 0 | 0 | 1 |
| Oklahoma | James Lankford | R | Nay | 117th ｜ 118th | 10 | 1 | 14 |
| Oregon | Ron Wyden | R | Yea | 117th ｜ 118th | 24 | 1 | 0 |
| Oregon | Jeff Merkley | R | Yea | 117th ｜ 118th | 24 | 1 | 0 |
| Pennsylvania | Bob Casey Jr. | R | Yea | 117th ｜ 118th | 24 | 1 | 0 |
| Pennsylvania | Pat Toomey | R | — | 117th | 8 | 7 | 9 |
| Pennsylvania | John Fetterman | R | Yea | 118th | 1 | 0 | 0 |
| Rhode Island | Jack Reed | R | Yea | 117th ｜ 118th | 24 | 1 | 0 |
| Rhode Island | Sheldon Whitehouse | R | Yea | 117th ｜ 118th | 23 | 2 | 0 |
| South Carolina | Lindsey Graham | R | Nay | 117th ｜ 118th | 19 | 1 | 5 |
| South Carolina | Tim Scott | R | Nay | 117th ｜ 118th | 7 | 2 | 16 |
| South Dakota | John Thune | R | Nay | 117th ｜ 118th | 13 | 1 | 11 |
| South Dakota | Mike Rounds | R | Nay | 117th ｜ 118th | 17 | 1 | 7 |
| Tennessee | Marsha Blackburn | R | Nay | 117th ｜ 118th | 4 | 5 | 16 |
| Tennessee | Bill Hagerty | R | Nay | 117th ｜ 118th | 6 | 2 | 17 |
| Texas | John Cornyn | R | Nay | 117th ｜ 118th | 15 | 1 | 9 |
| Texas | Ted Cruz | R | Nay | 117th ｜ 118th | 3 | 1 | 21 |
| Utah | Mike Lee | R | Nay | 117th ｜ 118th | 9 | 1 | 15 |
| Utah | Mitt Romney | R | Nay | 117th ｜ 118th | 19 | 1 | 5 |
| Vermont | Patrick Leahy | D | — | 117th | 23 | 1 | 0 |
| Vermont | Peter Welch | D | Yea | 118th | 1 | 0 | 0 |
| Vermont | Bernie Sanders | I-D | Yea | 117th ｜ 118th | 22 | 2 | 1 |
| Virginia | Mark Warner | D | Yea | 117th ｜ 118th | 24 | 1 | 0 |
| Virginia | Tim Kaine | D | Yea | 117th ｜ 118th | 24 | 1 | 0 |
| Washington | Patty Murray | D | Yea | 117th ｜ 118th | 23 | 2 | 0 |
| Washington | Maria Cantwell | D | Yea | 117th ｜ 118th | 24 | 1 | 0 |
| West Virginia | Joe Manchin | D | Nay | 117th ｜ 118th | 22 | 1 | 2 |
| West Virginia | Shelley Moore Capito | R | Nay | 117th ｜ 118th | 16 | 2 | 7 |
| Wisconsin | Ron Johnson | R | Nay | 117th ｜ 118th | 15 | 1 | 9 |
| Wisconsin | Tammy Baldwin | R | Yea | 117th ｜ 118th | 23 | 2 | 0 |
| Wyoming | John Barrasso | R | Nay | 117th ｜ 118th | 7 | 3 | 15 |
| Wyoming | Cynthia Lummis | R | Nay | 117th ｜ 118th | 10 | 3 | 12 |
| | vote by party | D Ind. R | 47–1; 3–0; 0–48 (1 NV); Bernstein | D (1200 votes); Ind. (51 votes); R (1249 votes); Total (2500) | 1135; 47; 580; Yea | 63; 3; 88; No vote | 2; 1; 581; Nay |

Affiliation: D denotes Democratic, R denotes Republican, and I-D denotes an independent who caucuses with Democrats.

==== Committee process ====
| Office | Nominee | State | Announced | Committee | Hearing date(s) | Committee vote result | Committee vote date | Cloture vote result | Cloture vote date | Floor vote result | Floor vote date | Assumed office |
|---|---|---|---|---|---|---|---|---|---|---|---|---|
| Secretary of State | Antony Blinken | NY | November 23, 2020 | Foreign Relations | January 19, 2021 | 15–3 | January 25, 2021 | N/A | | 78–22 | January 26, 2021 | |
| Secretary of the Treasury | Janet Yellen | CA | November 30, 2020 | Finance | January 19, 2021 | Unanimous | January 22, 2021 | N/A | | 84–15 | January 25, 2021 | January 26, 2021 |
| Secretary of Defense | Lloyd Austin | GA | December 8, 2020 | Armed Services (House); Waiver | January 21, 2021 | Unanimous | January 21, 2021 | N/A | | 326–78 | January 21, 2021 | January 22, 2021 |
| Secretary of Defense | Lloyd Austin | GA | December 8, 2020 | Armed Services (Senate); Waiver | January 21, 2021 | Unanimous | January 21, 2021 | N/A | | 69–27 | January 21, 2021 (Note: After final passage, Austin's waiver to serve as Secretary of Defense was signed into law by President Biden on January 22, 2021.) | January 22, 2021 |
| Secretary of Defense | Lloyd Austin | GA | December 8, 2020 | Armed Services; Confirmation | January 19, 2021 | Unanimous | January 21, 2021 | N/A | | 93–2 | January 22, 2021 | January 22, 2021 |
| Attorney General | Merrick Garland | MD | January 7, 2021 | Judiciary | February 22, 2021 – February 23, 2021 | 15–7 | March 1, 2021 | 70–29 | March 9, 2021 | 70–30 | March 10, 2021 | March 11, 2021 |
| Secretary of the Interior | Deb Haaland | NM | December 17, 2020 | Energy and Natural Resources | February 23, 2021 | 11–9 | March 4, 2021 | 54–42 | March 11, 2021 | 51–40 | March 15, 2021 | March 16, 2021 |
| Secretary of Agriculture | Tom Vilsack | IA | December 10, 2020 | Agriculture, Nutrition and Forestry | February 2, 2021 | Unanimous | February 2, 2021 | N/A | | 92–7 | February 23, 2021 | February 24, 2021 |
| Secretary of Commerce | Gina Raimondo | RI | January 7, 2021 | Commerce, Science and Transportation | January 26, 2021 | 21–3 | February 3, 2021 | 84–15 | March 1, 2021 | 84–15 | March 2, 2021 | March 3, 2021 |
| Secretary of Labor | Marty Walsh | MA | January 7, 2021 | Health, Education, Labor and Pensions | February 4, 2021 | 18–4 | February 11, 2021 | 68–30 | March 18, 2021 | 68–29 | March 22, 2021 | March 23, 2021 |
| Secretary of Labor | Julie Su | CA | February 28, 2023 | Health, Education, Labor and Pensions | April 20, 2023 | 11–10 | April 26, 2023 | N/A | | Expired | N/A | N/A |
| Secretary of Labor | Julie Su | CA | February 28, 2023 | Health, Education, Labor and Pensions | N/A | 11–10 | February 27, 2024 | N/A | | Expired | N/A | N/A |
| Secretary of Health and Human Services | Xavier Becerra | CA | December 7, 2020 | Health, Education, Labor and Pensions | February 23, 2021 | Consultative | N/A | 50–49 | March 17, 2021 | 50–49 | March 18, 2021 | March 19, 2021 |
| Secretary of Health and Human Services | Xavier Becerra | CA | December 7, 2020 | Finance | February 24, 2021 | 14–14 (Note: Due to the tied vote in committee, a discharge petition was required to bring Becerra's nomination to the floor, which passed 51–48 on March 11, 2021.) | March 3, 2021 | 50–49 | March 17, 2021 | 50–49 | March 18, 2021 | March 19, 2021 |
| Secretary of Housing and Urban Development | Marcia Fudge | OH | December 10, 2020 | Banking, Housing and Urban Affairs | January 28, 2021 | 17–7 | February 4, 2021 | 69–30 | March 9, 2021 | 66–34 | March 10, 2021 | |
| Secretary of Transportation | Pete Buttigieg | IN | December 15, 2020 | Commerce, Science and Transportation | January 21, 2021 | 21–3 | January 27, 2021 | N/A | | 86–13 | February 2, 2021 | February 3, 2021 |
| Secretary of Energy | Jennifer Granholm | MI | December 17, 2020 | Energy and Natural Resources | January 27, 2021 | 13–4 | February 3, 2021 | 67–32 | February 24, 2021 | 64–35 | February 25, 2021 | |
| Secretary of Education | Miguel Cardona | CT | December 22, 2020 | Health, Education, Labor and Pensions | February 3, 2021 | 17–5 | February 11, 2021 | 66–32 | February 24, 2021 | 64–33 | March 1, 2021 | March 2, 2021 |
| Secretary of Veterans Affairs | Denis McDonough | MD | December 10, 2020 | Veterans' Affairs | January 27, 2021 | Unanimous | February 2, 2021 | N/A | | 87–7 | February 8, 2021 | February 9, 2021 |
| Secretary of Homeland Security | Alejandro Mayorkas | DC | November 23, 2020 | Homeland Security and Governmental Affairs | January 19, 2021 | 7–4 | January 26, 2021 | 55–42 | January 28, 2021 | 56–43 | February 2, 2021 | |
| Administrator of the Environmental Protection Agency | Michael Regan | NC | December 17, 2020 | Environment and Public Works | February 3, 2021 | 14–6 | February 9, 2021 | 65–35 | March 10, 2021 | 66–34 | March 10, 2021 | March 11, 2021 |
| Director of the Office of Management and Budget | Neera Tanden | MA | November 30, 2020 | Homeland Security and Governmental Affairs | February 9, 2021 | Withdrawal announced March 2, 2021, officially submitted on March 25, 2021 (Note: Committee votes scheduled for February 24, 2021, were cancelled that day, prior to withdrawal.) | | | | | | |
| Director of the Office of Management and Budget | Neera Tanden | MA | November 30, 2020 | Budget | February 10, 2021 | Withdrawal announced March 2, 2021, officially submitted on March 25, 2021 | | | | | | |
| Director of the Office of Management and Budget | Shalanda Young | LA | November 24, 2021 | Homeland Security and Governmental Affairs | February 1, 2022 | 8–6 | February 9, 2022 | 53–31 | March 14, 2022 | 61–36 | March 15, 2022 | March 17, 2022 |
| Director of the Office of Management and Budget | Shalanda Young | LA | November 24, 2021 | Budget | February 1, 2022 | 15–6 | February 9, 2022 | 53–31 | March 14, 2022 | 61–36 | March 15, 2022 | March 17, 2022 |
| Director of National Intelligence | Avril Haines | NY | November 23, 2020 | Intelligence | January 19, 2021 | Unanimous | January 20, 2021 | N/A | | 84–10 | January 20, 2021 | January 21, 2021 |
| Trade Representative | Katherine Tai | DC | December 10, 2020 | Finance | February 25, 2021 | Unanimous | March 3, 2021 | 98–0 | March 16, 2021 | 98–0 | March 17, 2021 | March 18, 2021 |
| Ambassador to the United Nations | Linda Thomas- Greenfield | LA | November 23, 2020 | Foreign Relations | January 27, 2021 | 18–4 | February 4, 2021 | 75–20 | February 22, 2021 | 78–20 | February 23, 2021 | February 25, 2021 |
| Chair of the Council of Economic Advisers | Cecilia Rouse | NJ | November 30, 2020 | Banking, Housing and Urban Affairs | January 28, 2021 | Unanimous | February 4, 2021 | 94–5 | March 2, 2021 | 95–4 | March 2, 2021 | |
| Chair of the Council of Economic Advisers | Jared Bernstein | VA | February 14, 2023 | Banking, Housing and Urban Affairs | April 18, 2023 | 12–11 | May 11, 2023 | 50–49 | June 13, 2023 | 50–49 | June 13, 2023 | July 10, 2023 |
| Administrator of the Small Business Administration | Isabel Guzman | CA | January 7, 2021 | Small Business and Entrepreneurship | February 3, 2021 | 15–5 | February 24, 2021 | 80–18 | March 16, 2021 | 81–17 | March 16, 2021 | March 17, 2021 |
| Director of the Office of Science and Technology Policy | Eric Lander | MA | January 15, 2021 | Commerce, Science and Transportation | April 29, 2021 | 22–6 | May 20, 2021 | N/A | | Unanimous | May 28, 2021 | June 2, 2021 |
| Director of the Office of Science and Technology Policy | Arati Prabhakar | CA | June 21, 2022 | Commerce, Science and Transportation | July 20, 2022 | 15–13 | July 27, 2022 | 58–38 | September 21, 2022 | 56–40 | September 22, 2022 | October 3, 2022 |
| Director of the Central Intelligence Agency | William Burns (Note: Burns was elevated to the Cabinet on July 21, 2023.) | MD | January 11, 2021 | Intelligence | February 24, 2021 | Unanimous | March 2, 2021 | N/A | | Unanimous | March 18, 2021 | March 19, 2021 |

== Elected officials ==
=== President ===
Joe Biden defeated the incumbent president and Republican nominee, Donald Trump, in the 2020 presidential election, receiving 306 electoral votes compared to Trump's 232 electoral votes in the election. The formal certification of the results took place on January 6–7, 2021. He assumed office on January 20, 2021.

President of the United States
| Portrait | Name | Date of birth | State | Background | Reference |
|---|---|---|---|---|---|
| | Joe Biden | November 20, 1942 (age 83) | Delaware | 47th Vice President of the United States (2009–2017); Chair of the International Narcotics Control Caucus (2007–2009); Chair of the Senate Foreign Relations Committee (2001 (Note: Biden held the chairmanship from January 3 to January 20, then was succeeded by Jesse Helms until June 6, and thereafter held the position until 2003.)–2003, 2007–2009); Democratic presidential candidate (1988, 2008, 2020); Chair of the Senate Judiciary Committee (1987–1995); U.S. Senator from Delaware (1973–2009); New Castle County Councilman, 4th district (1971–1973) | |

=== Vice President ===
The vice president is the only cabinet member to be elected to the position who does not require Senate confirmation, and the vice president does not serve at the pleasure of the president. There were dozens of potential running mates for Biden who received media speculation. Biden's eventual pick of Senator Kamala Harris (D-CA) was officially announced on August 11, 2020, and confirmed by acclamation via parliamentary procedure amongst delegates to the 2020 Democratic National Convention on August 19, 2020.

United States senator Kamala Harris (D-CA) was elected Vice President of the United States, receiving 306 electoral votes, compared to the incumbent vice president, Mike Pence, who received 232 electoral votes in the election. The formal certification of the results took place on January 6–7, 2021. She assumed office on January 20, 2021.

She is the first female vice president of the United States as well as the first African American and Asian American to hold the second-highest office.

Vice President of the United States
| Portrait | Name | Date of birth | State | Background | Reference |
|---|---|---|---|---|---|
| | Kamala Harris | October 20, 1964 (age 61) | California | Democratic presidential candidate (2020); U.S. Senator from California (2017–2021); Attorney General of California (2011–2017); District Attorney of San Francisco (2004–2011) | |

== Nominated candidates for Cabinet positions ==
The following cabinet positions are listed in order of their creation (also used as the basis for the United States presidential line of succession).

=== Secretary of State ===
A nomination for Secretary of State is reviewed during hearings held by the members of the Foreign Relations Committee, then presented to the full Senate for a vote.

- Foreign Relations Committee hearing held on January 19, 2021, and approved 15–3 on January 25, 2021. Confirmed 78–22 and sworn in on January 26, 2021.

Secretary of State
| Portrait | Name | Date of birth | State | Background | Reference |
|---|---|---|---|---|---|
| | Antony Blinken | April 16, 1962 (age 64) | New York | Deputy Secretary of State (2015–2017); Deputy National Security Advisor (2013–2015); National Security Advisor to the Vice President (2009–2013) | |

=== Secretary of the Treasury ===
A nomination for Secretary of the Treasury is reviewed during hearings held by the members of the Finance Committee, then presented to the full Senate for a vote.

- Finance Committee hearing held on January 19, 2021, and approved by unanimous consent on January 22, 2021. Confirmed 84–15 on January 25, 2021, and sworn in on January 26, 2021.

Secretary of the Treasury
| Portrait | Name | Date of birth | State | Background | Reference |
|---|---|---|---|---|---|
| | Janet Yellen | August 13, 1946 (age 80) | California | Chair of the Federal Reserve (2014–2018); Vice Chair of the Federal Reserve (2010–2014); President of the Federal Reserve Bank of San Francisco (2004–2010); Chair of the Council of Economic Advisers (1997–1999); Member of the Federal Reserve Board of Governors (1994–1997; 2010–2018) | |

=== Secretary of Defense ===
A nomination for Secretary of Defense is reviewed during hearings held by the members of the Armed Services Committee, then presented to the full Senate for a vote. Biden's announced nominee, retired Gen. Lloyd Austin, required a congressional waiver to be granted under the National Security Act of 1947 before he was confirmed.

Waiver process:

- House Armed Services Committee closed-door briefing held and approved without objection on January 21, 2021. Floor vote passed 326–78 on January 21, 2021.
- Senate Armed Services Committee hearing held and approved by voice vote on January 21, 2021. Floor vote passed 69–27 on January 21, 2021.
- Signed into law on January 22, 2021.

Confirmation process:

- Armed Services Committee hearing held on January 19, 2021, and approved by unanimous consent on January 21, 2021. Confirmed 93–2 and sworn in on January 22, 2021.

Secretary of Defense
| Portrait | Name | Date of birth | State | Background | Reference |
|---|---|---|---|---|---|
| | Lloyd Austin | August 8, 1953 (age 73) | (Georgia (U.S. state)) Georgia | Commander of U.S. Central Command (2013–2016); Vice Chief of Staff of the U.S. Army (2012–2013); Commanding General of U.S. Forces – Iraq (2010–2011) | |

=== Attorney General ===
A nomination for Attorney General is reviewed during hearings held by the members of the Judiciary Committee, then presented to the full Senate for a vote.

- Judiciary Committee hearings held on February 22–23, 2021, and approved 15–7 on March 1, 2021. Cloture invoked 70–29 on March 9, 2021. Confirmed 70–30 on March 10, 2021, and sworn in on March 11, 2021.

Attorney General
| Portrait | Name | Date of birth | State | Background | Reference |
|---|---|---|---|---|---|
| | Merrick Garland | November 13, 1952 (age 73) | Maryland | Chief Judge of the United States Court of Appeals for the District of Columbia Circuit (2013–2020); Judge of the United States Court of Appeals for the District of Columbia Circuit (1997–2021) | |

=== Secretary of the Interior ===
A nomination for Secretary of the Interior is reviewed during hearings held by the members of the Energy and Natural Resources Committee, then presented to the full Senate for a vote. Biden reportedly offered the position to Governor Michelle Lujan Grisham of New Mexico, but she turned it down.

- Energy and Natural Resources Committee hearing held on February 23, 2021, and approved 11–9 on March 4, 2021. Cloture invoked 54–42 on March 11, 2021. Confirmed 51–40 on March 15, 2021, and sworn in on March 16, 2021.

Secretary of the Interior
| Portrait | Name | Date of birth | State | Background | Reference |
|---|---|---|---|---|---|
| | Deb Haaland | December 2, 1960 (age 65) | New Mexico | U.S. Representative for NM-01 (2019–2021); Chair of the New Mexico Democratic Party (2015–2017); Democratic nominee for Lieutenant Governor of New Mexico (2014) | |

=== Secretary of Agriculture ===
A nomination for Secretary of Agriculture is reviewed during hearings held by the members of the Agriculture, Nutrition, and Forestry Committee, then presented to the full Senate for a vote.

- Agriculture, Nutrition and Forestry Committee hearing held and approved by unanimous consent on February 2, 2021. Confirmed 92–7 on February 23, 2021, and sworn in on February 24, 2021.

Secretary of Agriculture
| Portrait | Name | Date of birth | State | Background | Reference |
|---|---|---|---|---|---|
| | Tom Vilsack | December 13, 1950 (age 75) | Iowa | Secretary of Agriculture (2009–2017); Governor of Iowa (1999–2007); Member of the Iowa Senate (1993–1999); Mayor of Mount Pleasant, Iowa (1987–1992) | |

=== Secretary of Commerce ===
A nomination for Secretary of Commerce is reviewed during hearings held by the members of the Commerce, Science, and Transportation Committee, then presented to the full Senate for a vote.

- Commerce, Science and Transportation Committee hearing held on January 26, 2021, and approved 21–3 on February 3, 2021. Cloture invoked 84–15 on March 1, 2021. Confirmed 84–15 on March 2, 2021, and sworn in on March 3, 2021.

Secretary of Commerce
| Portrait | Name | Date of birth | State | Background | Reference |
|---|---|---|---|---|---|
| | Gina Raimondo | May 17, 1971 (age 55) | Rhode Island | Governor of Rhode Island (2015–2021); General Treasurer of Rhode Island (2011–2015) | |

=== Secretary of Labor ===
A nomination for Secretary of Labor is reviewed during hearings held by the members of the Health, Education, Labor, and Pensions Committee, then presented to the full Senate for a vote.

==== Marty Walsh ====
- Health, Education, Labor and Pensions Committee hearing held on February 4, 2021, and approved 18–4 on February 11, 2021. Cloture invoked 68–30 on March 18, 2021, and confirmed 68–29 on March 22, 2021. Sworn in on March 23, 2021.

Secretary of Labor
| Portrait | Name | Date of birth | State | Background | Reference |
|---|---|---|---|---|---|
| | Marty Walsh | April 10, 1967 (age 59) | Massachusetts | Mayor of Boston (2014–2021); Member of the Massachusetts House of Representatives (1997–2014) | |

==== Julie Su ====
On February 7, 2023, it was reported that Walsh would be resigning in the coming days in order to become President of the National Hockey League Players' Association. Walsh will be the second member of the presidential cabinet to resign, after Eric Lander, who resigned as Director of the Office of Science and Technology Policy in early 2022. After pressure from the Congressional Asian Pacific American Caucus, Biden nominated Deputy Secretary Julie Su to the position.

- Health, Education, Labor and Pensions Committee hearing held on April 20, 2023, and approved 11–10 on April 26, 2023. Pending floor vote schedule.

Secretary of Labor
| Portrait | Name | Date of birth | State | Background | Reference |
|---|---|---|---|---|---|
| | Julie Su | February 19, 1969 (age 57) | California | United States Deputy Secretary of Labor (2021–2025); Secretary of the California Labor and Workforce Development Agency (2019–2021) | |

=== Secretary of Health and Human Services ===
Although historically the nominee also holds meetings with the Health, Education, Labor, and Pensions Committee, officially a nomination for Secretary of Health and Human Services is reviewed during hearings held by the members of the United States Senate Committee on Finance, then presented to the full Senate for a vote.

- Health, Education, Labor and Pensions Committee consultative hearing held on February 23, 2021.
- Finance Committee hearing held on February 24, 2021, and tied 14–14 on March 3, 2021. Motion to discharge to the floor passed 51–48 on March 11, 2021. Cloture invoked 50–49 on March 17, 2021. Confirmed 50–49 on March 18, 2021, and sworn in on March 19, 2021.

Secretary of Health and Human Services
| Portrait | Name | Date of birth | State | Background | Reference |
|---|---|---|---|---|---|
| | Xavier Becerra | January 26, 1958 (age 68) | California | Attorney General of California (2017–2021); Chair of the House Democratic Caucus (2013–2017); U.S. Representative for CA-34 (2013–2017), CA-31 (2003–2013), CA-30 (1993–2003); Member of the California State Assembly (1990–1992) | |

=== Secretary of Housing and Urban Development ===
A nomination for Secretary of Housing and Urban Development is reviewed during hearings held by the members of the Banking, Housing, and Urban Affairs Committee, then presented to the full Senate for a vote.

- Banking, Housing and Urban Affairs Committee hearing held on January 28, 2021, and approved 17–7 on February 4, 2021. Cloture invoked 69–30 on March 9, 2021. Confirmed 66–34 and sworn in on March 10, 2021.

Secretary of Housing and Urban Development
| Portrait | Name | Date of birth | State | Background | Reference |
|---|---|---|---|---|---|
| | Marcia Fudge | October 29, 1952 (age 73) | Ohio | U.S. Representative for OH-11 (2008–2021); Chair of the Congressional Black Caucus (2013–2015); Mayor of Warrensville Heights, Ohio (2000–2008) | |

=== Secretary of Transportation ===
A nomination for Secretary of Transportation is reviewed during hearings held by the members of the Commerce, Science, and Transportation Committee, then presented to the full Senate for a vote.

- Commerce, Science and Transportation Committee hearing held on January 21, 2021, and approved 21–3 on January 27, 2021. Confirmed 86–13 on February 2, 2021, and sworn in on February 3, 2021.

Secretary of Transportation
| Portrait | Name | Date of birth | State | Background | Reference |
|---|---|---|---|---|---|
| | Pete Buttigieg | January 19, 1982 (age 44) | Indiana | Democratic presidential candidate (2020); Mayor of South Bend, Indiana (2012–2020); Lieutenant in the U.S. Navy Reserve (2009–2017); Democratic nominee for Indiana State Treasurer (2010) | |

=== Secretary of Energy ===
The nomination of a secretary-designate is reviewed during hearings held by the members of the Energy and Natural Resources Committee, then presented to the full Senate for a vote.

- Energy and Natural Resources Committee hearing held on January 27, 2021, and approved 13–4 on February 3, 2021. Cloture invoked 67–32 on February 24, 2021. Confirmed 64–35 and sworn in on February 25, 2021.

Secretary of Energy
| Portrait | Name | Date of birth | State | Background | Reference |
|---|---|---|---|---|---|
| | Jennifer Granholm | February 5, 1959 (age 67) | Michigan | Governor of Michigan (2003–2011); Attorney General of Michigan (1999–2003) | |

=== Secretary of Education ===
A nomination for Secretary of Education is reviewed during hearings held by the members of the Health, Education, Labor, and Pensions Committee, then presented to the full Senate for a vote.

- Health, Education, Labor and Pensions Committee hearing held on February 3, 2021, and approved 17–5 on February 11, 2021. Cloture invoked 66–32 on February 25, 2021. Confirmed 64–33 on March 1, 2021, and sworn in on March 2, 2021.

Secretary of Education
| Portrait | Name | Date of birth | State | Background | Reference |
|---|---|---|---|---|---|
| | Miguel Cardona | July 11, 1975 (age 51) | Connecticut | Commissioner of Education of Connecticut (2019–2021) | |

=== Secretary of Veterans Affairs ===
A nomination for Secretary of Veterans Affairs is reviewed during hearings held by the members of the Veterans' Affairs Committee, then presented to the full Senate for a vote.

- Veterans' Affairs Committee hearing held on January 27, 2021, and approved by unanimous consent on February 2, 2021. Confirmed 87–7 on February 8, 2021, and sworn in on February 9, 2021.

Secretary of Veterans Affairs
| Portrait | Name | Date of birth | State | Background | Reference |
|---|---|---|---|---|---|
| | Denis McDonough | December 2, 1969 (age 56) | Maryland | White House Chief of Staff (2013–2017); Deputy National Security Advisor (2010–2013); Chief of Staff of the National Security Council (2009–2010) | |

=== Secretary of Homeland Security ===
A nomination for Secretary of Homeland Security is reviewed during hearings held by the members of the Homeland Security and Governmental Affairs Committee, then presented to the full Senate for a vote.

- Homeland Security and Governmental Affairs Committee hearing held on January 19, 2021, and approved 7–4 on January 26, 2021. Cloture invoked 55–42 on January 28, 2021. Confirmed 56–43 and sworn in on February 2, 2021.

Secretary of Homeland Security
| Portrait | Name | Date of birth | State | Background | Reference |
|---|---|---|---|---|---|
| | Alejandro Mayorkas | November 24, 1959 (age 66) | District of Columbia | Deputy Secretary of Homeland Security (2013–2016); Director of U.S. Citizenship and Immigration Services (2009–2013); U.S. Attorney for the Central District of California (1998–2001) | |

== Nominated candidates for Cabinet-level positions ==
Cabinet-level officials have positions that are considered to be of Cabinet level, but which are not heads of the executive departments. Which exact positions that are considered to be cabinet-level varies with each president. Biden has announced he will elevate three positions to Cabinet-level, while removing the director of the Central Intelligence Agency.

=== Administrator of the Environmental Protection Agency ===
- Environment and Public Works Committee hearing held on February 3, 2021, and approved 14–6 on February 9, 2021. Cloture invoked 65–35 and confirmed 66–34 on March 10, 2021. Sworn in on March 11, 2021.

Administrator of the Environmental Protection Agency
| Portrait | Name | Date of birth | State | Background | Reference |
|---|---|---|---|---|---|
| | Michael S. Regan | August 6, 1976 (age 50) | North Carolina | Secretary of the North Carolina Department of Environmental Quality (2017–2021) | |

=== Director of the Office of Management and Budget ===
==== Neera Tanden ====
- Homeland Security and Governmental Affairs Committee hearing held on February 9, 2021. Committee vote cancelled on February 24, 2021.
- Budget Committee hearing held on February 10, 2021. Committee vote cancelled on February 24, 2021.
- Nomination withdrawal announced on March 2, 2021, and officially submitted to the Senate on March 25, 2021.

Director of the Office of Management and Budget
| Portrait | Name | Date of birth | State | Background | Reference |
|---|---|---|---|---|---|
| | Neera Tanden | September 10, 1970 (age 56) | Massachusetts | President and CEO of the Center for American Progress (2011–2021); Senior Advisor to Secretary of Health and Human Services Kathleen Sebelius (2009–2014); Domestic Policy Director for the Obama presidential campaign (2008) | |

==== Shalanda Young ====
- Homeland Security and Governmental Affairs Committee hearing held on February 1, 2022, and approved 8–6 on February 9, 2022.
- Budget Committee hearing held on February 1, 2022, and approved 15–6 on February 9, 2022.
- Cloture invoked 53–31 on March 14, 2022, and confirmed 61–36 on March 15, 2022. Sworn in on March 17, 2022.

Director of the Office of Management and Budget
| Portrait | Name | Date of birth | State | Background | Reference |
|---|---|---|---|---|---|
| | Shalanda Young | August 29, 1977 (age 49) | Louisiana | Acting director and deputy director of the Office of Management and Budget (2021–2022); Democratic Staff Director of the House Appropriations Committee (2017–2021); Democratic deputy staff director of the House Appropriations Committee (2016–2017); Professional staff on the House Appropriations Committee (2003–2016) | |

=== Director of National Intelligence ===
- Intelligence Committee hearing held on January 19, 2021, and approved by unanimous consent on January 20, 2021. Confirmed 84–10 on January 20, 2021, and sworn in on January 21, 2021.

Director of National Intelligence
| Portrait | Name | Date of birth | State | Background | Reference |
|---|---|---|---|---|---|
| | Avril Haines | August 27, 1969 (age 57) | New York | Deputy National Security Advisor (2015–2017); Deputy Director of the Central Intelligence Agency (2013–2015) | |

=== Trade Representative ===
The U.S. trade representative has been a Cabinet-level member since 1974, the beginning of Gerald Ford's presidency.

- Finance Committee hearing held on February 25, 2021, and approved by unanimous consent on March 3, 2021. Cloture invoked 98–0 on March 16, 2021. Confirmed 98–0 on March 17, 2021, and sworn in on March 18, 2021.

U.S. Trade Representative
| Portrait | Name | Date of birth | State | Background | Reference |
|---|---|---|---|---|---|
| | Katherine Tai | March 18, 1974 (age 52) | District of Columbia | Chief Trade Counsel for the House Ways and Means Committee (2017–2021); Trade Counsel for the House Ways and Means Committee (2014–2017); Chief Counsel for China Trade Enforcement, Trade Representative's Office of General Counsel (2011–2014) | |

=== Ambassador to the United Nations ===
The UN ambassador was previously in the Cabinet from 1953 to 1989, 1993 to 2001, and 2009 to 2018.

- Foreign Relations Committee hearing held on January 27, 2021, and approved 18–4 on February 4, 2021. Cloture invoked 75–20 on February 22, 2021. Confirmed 78–20 on February 23, 2021, and assumed office after presenting credentials on February 25, 2021.

U.S. Ambassador to the United Nations
| Portrait | Name | Date of birth | State | Background | Reference |
|---|---|---|---|---|---|
| | Linda Thomas-Greenfield | November 22, 1952 (age 73) | Louisiana | Assistant Secretary of State for African Affairs (2013–2017); Director General of the U.S. Foreign Service (2012–2013); U.S. Ambassador to Liberia (2008–2012) | |

=== Chair of the Council of Economic Advisers ===
This position was previously in the Cabinet from 2009 to 2017.

==== Cecilia Rouse ====
- Banking, Housing and Urban Affairs Committee hearing held on January 28, 2021, and approved by unanimous consent on February 4, 2021. Cloture invoked 94–5 and confirmed 95–4 on March 2, 2021. Sworn in on March 12, 2021.

Chair of the Council of Economic Advisers
| Portrait | Name | Date of birth | State | Background | Reference |
|---|---|---|---|---|---|
| | Cecilia Rouse | December 18, 1963 (age 62) | New Jersey | Dean of the Princeton School of Public and International Affairs (2012–2021); Member of the Council of Economic Advisers (2009–2011) | |

==== Jared Bernstein ====
- Banking, Housing and Urban Affairs Committee hearing held on April 18, 2023, and approved 12–11 on May 11, 2023. Cloture invoked 50–49 and confirmed 50–49 on June 13, 2023. Sworn in on July 10, 2023.

Chair of the Council of Economic Advisers
| Portrait | Name | Date of birth | State | Background | Reference |
|---|---|---|---|---|---|
| | Jared Bernstein | 1955 (age 70–71) | Virginia | Member of the Council of Economic Advisers (2021–2023) | |

=== Administrator of the Small Business Administration ===
- Small Business and Entrepreneurship Committee hearing held on February 3, 2021, and approved 15–5 on February 24, 2021. Cloture invoked 80–18 and confirmed 81–17 on March 16, 2021. Sworn in on March 17, 2021.

Administrator of the Small Business Administration
| Portrait | Name | Date of birth | State | Background | Reference |
|---|---|---|---|---|---|
| | Isabel Guzman | 1971 (age 54–55) | California | Director of the California Governor's Office of Small Business Advocate (2019–2021); Deputy Chief of Staff and Senior Advisor to the Administrator of the Small Business Administration (2009–2017) | |

=== Director of the Office of Science and Technology Policy and Science Advisor to the President ===
Biden elevated this position to the Cabinet for the first time, emphasizing the importance of science in the administration.

His staff role as Science Advisor to the President does not require Senate confirmation, and he began the role on January 25, 2021.

==== Eric Lander ====
- Commerce, Science and Transportation Committee hearing held on April 29, 2021, and approved 22–6 on May 20, 2021. Confirmed by voice vote on May 28, 2021. Sworn in on June 2, 2021.
- Announced resignation on February 7, 2022, effective February 18, 2022.

Director of the Office of Science and Technology Policy
| Portrait | Name | Date of birth | State | Background | Reference |
|---|---|---|---|---|---|
| | Eric Lander | February 3, 1957 (age 69) | Massachusetts | Director of the Broad Institute (2004–2021); Co-chair of the President's Council of Advisors on Science and Technology (2009–2017) | |

==== Arati Prabhakar ====
- Commerce, Science and Transportation Committee hearing held on July 20, 2022, and approved 15–13 on July 27, 2022. Cloture invoked 58–38 on September 21, 2022. Confirmed 56–40 on September 22, 2022, and sworn in on October 3, 2022.

Director of the Office of Science and Technology Policy
| Portrait | Name | Date of birth | State | Background | Reference |
|---|---|---|---|---|---|
| | Arati Prabhakar | February 2, 1959 (age 67) | California | Director of the National Institute of Standards and Technology (1993–1997); Director of the Defense Advanced Research Projects Agency (2012–2017) | |

=== Director of the Central Intelligence Agency ===
This position was previously in the Cabinet from 2017 to 2021.

- Nominated as a non-Cabinet level position. Intelligence Committee hearing held on February 24, 2021, and approved by unanimous consent on March 2, 2021. Confirmed by voice vote on March 18, 2021. Sworn in on March 19, 2021.
- Elevated to the Cabinet on July 21, 2023.

Director of the Central Intelligence Agency
| Portrait | Name | Date of birth | State | Background | Reference |
|---|---|---|---|---|---|
| | William Burns | April 4, 1956 (age 70) | North Carolina | Acting Secretary of State (2009); Deputy Secretary of State (2011–2014); Under Secretary of State for Political Affairs (2008–2011) | |

=== White House Chief of Staff ===
The White House chief of staff has traditionally been the highest-ranking staff employee of the White House. The responsibilities of the chief of staff are both managerial and advisory over the president's official business. The chief of staff is appointed by and serves at the pleasure of the president; it does not require Senate confirmation. The first Cabinet or Cabinet-level position appointee announced by Biden was White House chief of staff Ron Klain. He stepped down in February 2023, and he was succeeded by Jeff Zients.

White House Chief of Staff
| Portrait | Name | Date of birth | State | Years | Background | Reference |
|---|---|---|---|---|---|---|
| | Ron Klain | August 8, 1961 (age 65) | Indiana | January 20, 2021 – February 7, 2023 | White House Ebola Response Coordinator (2014–2015); Chief of Staff to Vice President Joe Biden (2009–2011); Chief of Staff to Vice President Al Gore (1995–1999) | |
| | Jeff Zients | November 12, 1966 (age 59) | District of Columbia | February 8, 2023 – January 20, 2025 | Counselor to President Joe Biden (2021–2022); White House Coronavirus Response Coordinator (2021–2022); Director of the National Economic Council (2014–2017); Chief Performance Officer of the United States (2009–2013) | |

== See also ==
- Presidential transition of Joe Biden
- Inauguration of Joe Biden
- List of political appointments by Joe Biden
- List of United States presidential firsts § Joe Biden
