= Isabel Guzman =

American government official (born 1970)

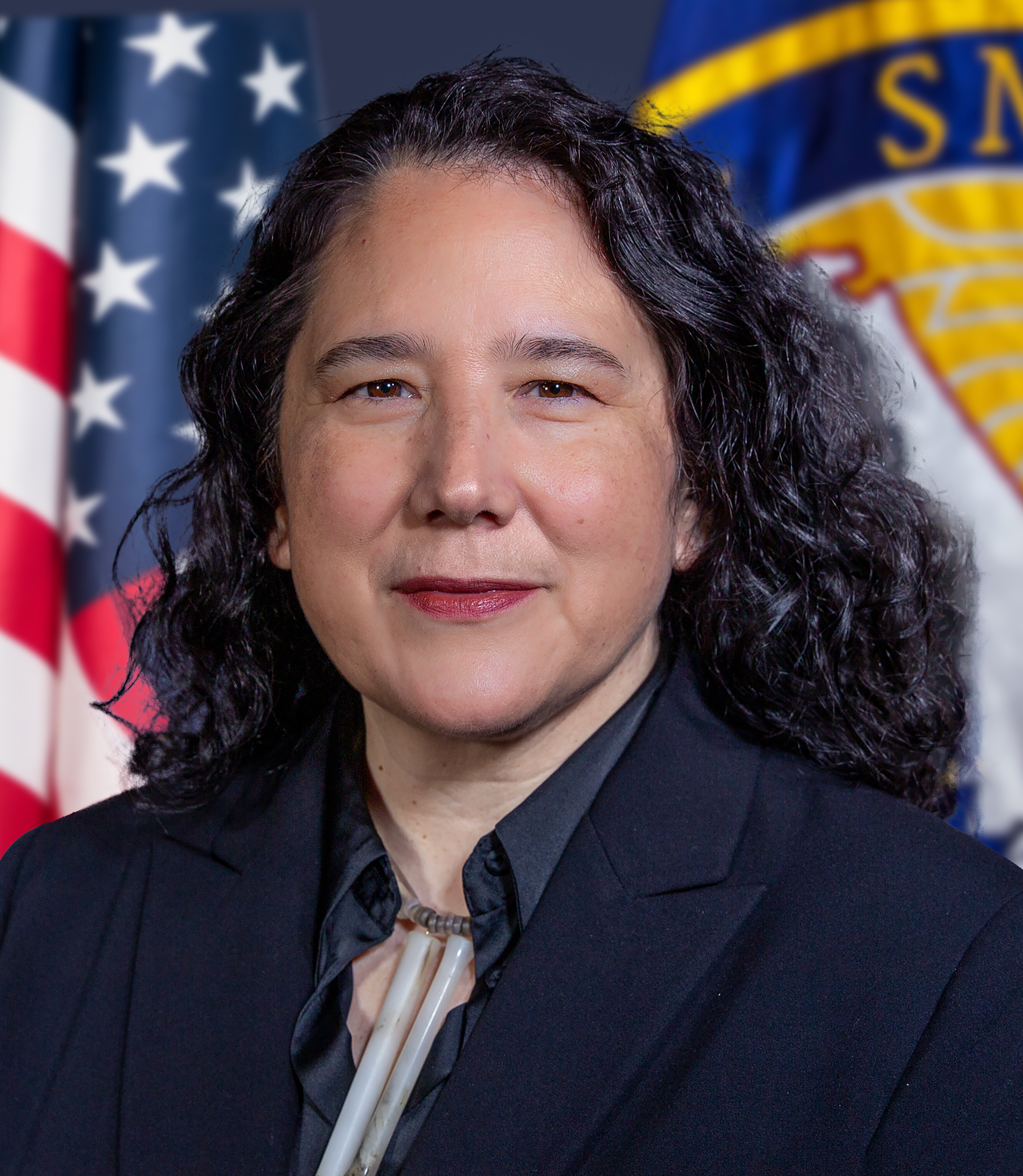
- Guzman in 2024

27th Administrator of the Small Business Administration
- In office March 17, 2021 – January 20, 2025
- President: Joe Biden
- Deputy: Dilawar Syed
- Preceded by: Jovita Carranza
- Succeeded by: Kelly Loeffler

Personal details
- Born: Isabella Casillas Guzman; January 8, 1970 (age 56) Burbank, California, U.S.
- Education: University of Pennsylvania (BS)

Isabella Casillas Guzman (born January 8, 1970) is an American government official who served as the administrator of the Small Business Administration in the Biden administration from 2021 to 2025. She assumed office on March 17, 2021. She is the fifth Latina woman to ever have served in the Cabinet of the United States.

== Early life and education ==
Guzman was born in Burbank, California. Guzman is of Mexican ancestry. She hails from four generations of Texans who originally fled the Mexican Revolution from the states of Aguascalientes and Jalisco. In the 1960s, Guzman's father moved from Texas to Los Angeles. According to a Larta Institute profile, Guzman says her heritage also includes Jewish, German and possibly Chinese ancestry. Her parents owned a small business.

Guzman received a Bachelor of Science from the University of Pennsylvania Wharton School of Business.

== Career ==
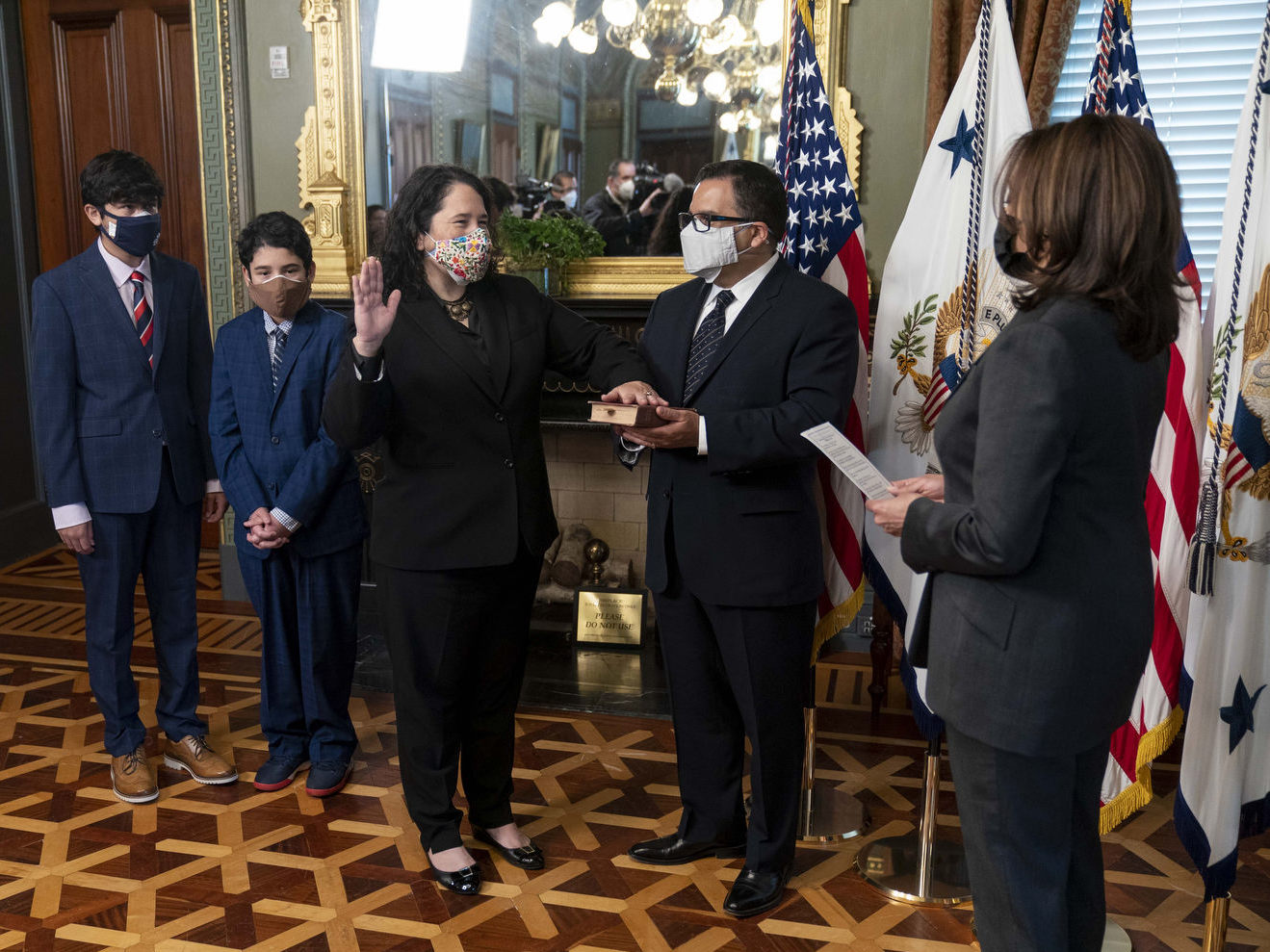
Guzman sworn in as administrator of the Small Business Administration by Kamala Harris in 2021

Guzman was studio manager and managing partner at Miauhaus Studios from 1998 to 2002, continuing as managing partner through 2010. She served as a deputy appointments secretary for California Governor Gray Davis from 2002 to 2003. She was manager and advisor to founder at Illulian from 2003 to 2005, taking a sabbatical in 2004 to consult during the launch of Fortius Holdings. She was director of strategic initiatives and advisor to founding chair at ProAmerica Bank from 2009 to 2014, then joined the Small Business Administration in 2014 as deputy chief of staff. From 2017 to 2019, she worked as an independent consultant with clients such as the Larta Institute, before co-founding and directing GovContractPros in 2018.

Beginning April 2019, Guzman served as the director of California's Office of the Small Business Advocate, a department within the California Governor's Office of Economic Development.

On January 7, 2021, it was announced that Guzman would be President-elect Joe Biden's nominee for administrator of the Small Business Administration. Guzman was reported out of the Senate Small Business Committee by a 15–5 vote, and confirmed on March 16, 2021, in an 81–17 vote of the United States Senate.

Political offices
| Preceded by Jovita Carranza | Administrator of the Small Business Administration; 2021–2025 | Succeeded by Kelly Loeffler |
