= Jovita Carranza =

American businesswoman and government administrator (born 1949)

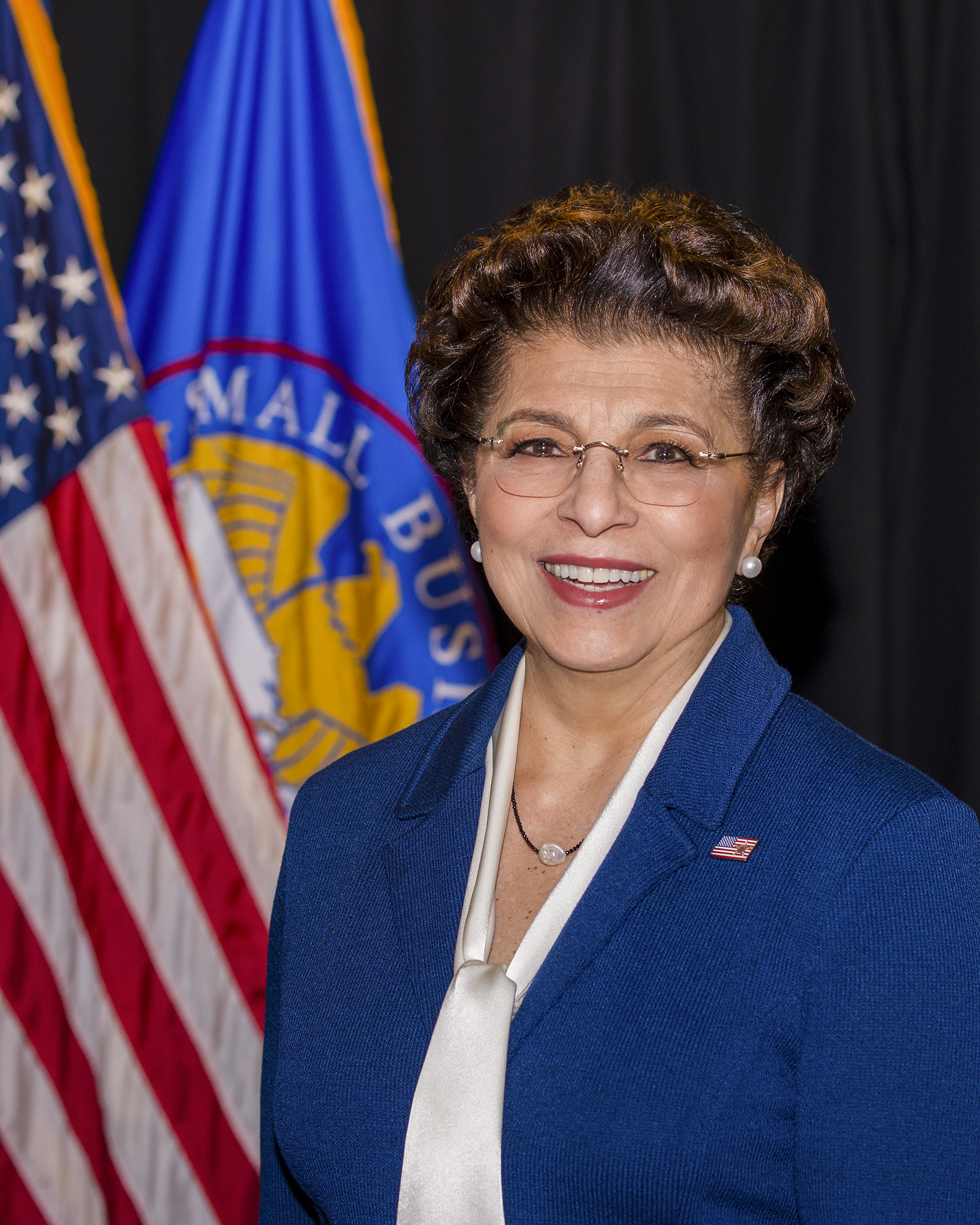
- Official portrait, 2020

26th Administrator of the Small Business Administration
- In office January 14, 2020 – January 20, 2021
- President: Donald Trump
- Preceded by: Linda McMahon
- Succeeded by: Isabel Guzman

44th Treasurer of the United States
- In office June 19, 2017 – January 14, 2020
- President: Donald Trump
- Preceded by: Rosie Rios
- Succeeded by: Marilynn Malerba

Deputy Administrator of the Small Business Administration
- In office December 15, 2006 – January 20, 2009
- President: George W. Bush
- Preceded by: Melanie Sabelhaus
- Succeeded by: Marie Johns

Personal details
- Born: June 29, 1949 (age 77) Chicago, Illinois, U.S.
- Party: Republican
- Education: California State University, Los Angeles (attended); University of Miami (BA, MBA)

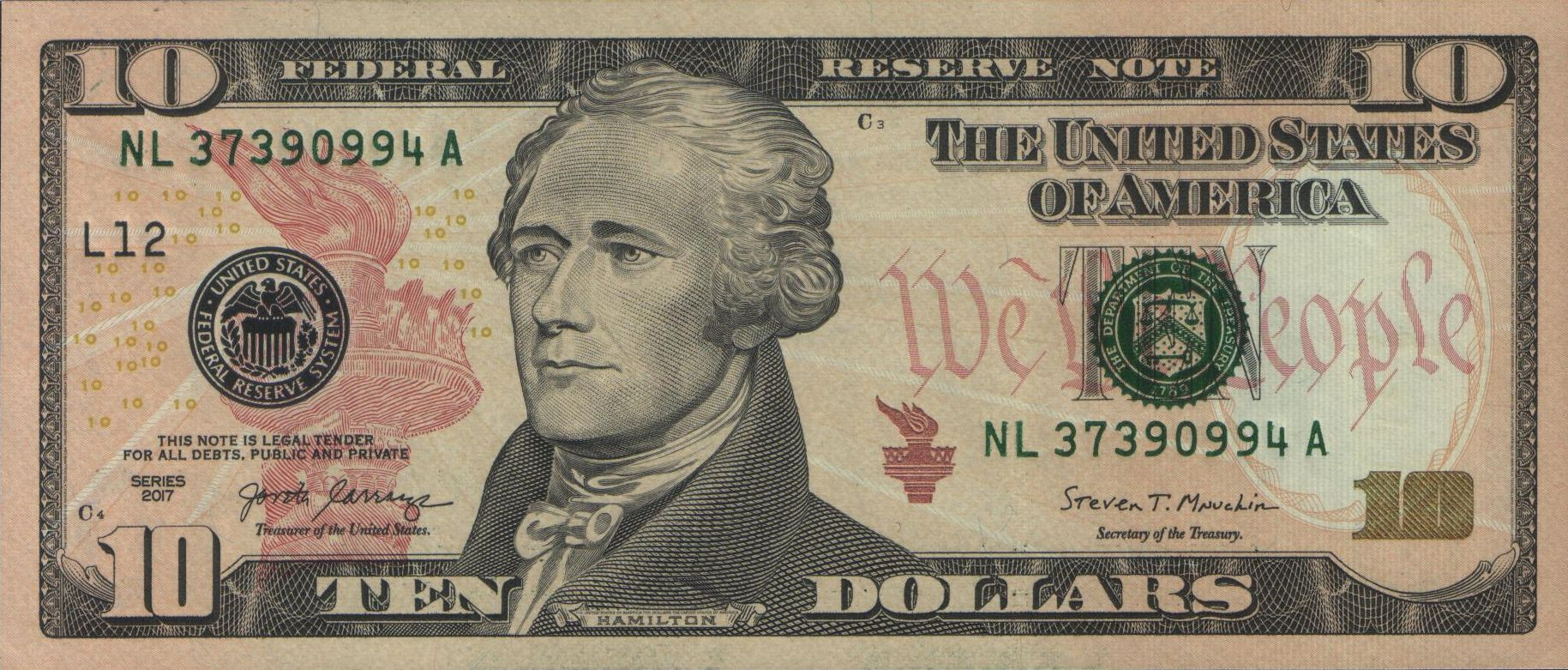
Carranza's currency signature

Jovita Carranza (born June 29, 1949) is a Mexican-American businesswoman who served as the 26th administrator of the Small Business Administration from 2020 to 2021, having previously served as the 44th treasurer of the United States from 2017 to 2020. She was appointed to both roles by President Donald Trump. Before that she served as the Deputy Administrator of the Small Business Administration from December 2006 to January 2009. Appointed by President George W. Bush, Carranza was unanimously confirmed by the U.S. Senate. Prior to her first appointment to the SBA, Carranza served as Vice President of Air Operations for United Parcel Service (UPS) at its facility in Louisville, Kentucky.

Previously, Carranza was the president and CEO of the JCR Group, a consulting firm with a focus on business development, profit and loss management, operations, logistics and systems optimization.

On August 1, 2019, President Trump nominated Carranza to be administrator of the Small Business Administration, replacing Linda McMahon. She was confirmed on January 7, 2020, and sworn in a week later. Carranza was the highest-ranking Hispanic woman in the Trump administration.

== Early life and education ==
Born in Illinois, Carranza grew up in Chicago in an immigrant family from Mexico. Carranza's mother was a housewife and her father worked as a factory foreman. Carranza earned her Bachelor of Arts and MBA from the University of Miami. She has received executive, management and financial training at INSEAD, the University of Michigan, and the University of Chicago.

== Career ==
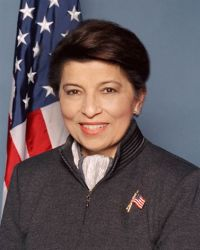
Carranza as Deputy Administrator of the Small Business Administration

In the mid-1970s, Carranza's first post at United Parcel Service was a part-time, night-shift box handler. She worked her way up to vice president managing domestic operations and president of international operations for Latin America and the Caribbean. When she left UPS, she served as vice president of air operations at its facility in Louisville, Kentucky, and was the highest-ranking Latina in UPS history.

Carranza was appointed by President George W. Bush as Deputy Administrator of the Small Business Administration. She served on that position from 2006 to 2009. As Deputy Administrator, she helped manage an agency with more than 80 field offices across the country and a portfolio of direct and guaranteed business loans, venture capital investments and disaster loans worth almost $80 billion. In an effort to improve customer response, Carranza led key operational improvement initiatives and projects.

Carranza is the founder and president of The JCR Group, a consulting firm serving corporations and NGOs on issues of business development and profit and loss management. She is also a lecturer, columnist and commentator on political and business issues. Her articles have appeared in TownHall.com and other publications. She has lectured at Johns Hopkins University in Washington.

In 2014, she joined the "Women for Rauner" campaign in Illinois promoting the Bruce Rauner and Evelyn Sanguinetti ticket. On April 14, 2015, Governor Bruce Rauner appointed Carranza a member of the Illinois Enterprise Zone Board for a term starting March 31, 2015 and ending March 31, 2018. The Enterprise Zone Board was established by state law to approve or deny applications related to the establishment, revision, or termination of enterprise zones established under the Illinois Enterprise Zone Act. Carranza was confirmed by the Illinois Senate on April 30, 2015.

During the 2016 presidential election, Carranza was a member of the Trump campaign's National Hispanic Advisory Council. On April 28, 2017, she was named by President Trump as his appointee to fill the position of U.S. Treasurer, vacant since the resignation of Rosa Gumataotao Rios in July 2016. Carranza was sworn in on June 19, 2017. She was also appointed in August 2018 to serve as one of two members of the administration's Women's Suffrage Centennial Commission.

On July 31, 2019, President Trump announced the nomination of Carranza to be Administrator of the Small Business Administration. The United States Senate confirmed her nomination on January 7, 2020, by a vote of 88–5; she was sworn in one week later. Carranza has led the SBA's response to the COVID-19 recession resulting from the COVID-19 pandemic. On April 3, 2020, Carranza announced the launch of the Paycheck Protection Program – a $349 billion emergency loan program provided through the Coronavirus Aid, Relief, and Economic Security Act (CARES Act). Since PPP's launch, nearly 1.7 million forgivable loans have been approved by SBA.

Carranza has been criticized by some in both political parties for the rollout of the Economic Injury Disaster Loans (EIDL) program.

== Boards and civic involvement ==
Carranza has served as a board member for several national nonprofit organizations such as the National Center for Family Literacy and United Way. She also has been involved in the UPS Congressional Contact program, chaired corporate committees responsible for global strategies, and has had experience with public speaking and advisory councils in multiple venues.

== Honors and awards ==
- Woman of the Year for outstanding accomplishments throughout her career by Hispanic Business Magazine in 2004.
- Recognized for immeasurable contributions to the Hispanic community and for her public service to this country presented by The Latino Coalition Leadership in Washington, DC - October 2008.
- Received honors as a Woman of Distinction by the American Association of University Women and NASPA at the National Conference for College Women Student Leaders in June 2008.
- Honorary Alumna for Alverno College
- Albert Schweitzer Leadership Award by Hugh O'Brian Youth Leadership (HOBY)

She is a member of several honor societies and has active civic participation with women, youth and minority groups

Political offices
Preceded by Rosa Gumataotao Rios	Treasurer of the United States; 2017–2020	Succeeded by Marilynn Malerba
Preceded by Linda McMahon	Administrator of the Small Business Administration; 2020–2021	Succeeded by Isabel Guzman
