= Althea Coetzee =

American Navy admiral (born 1963)

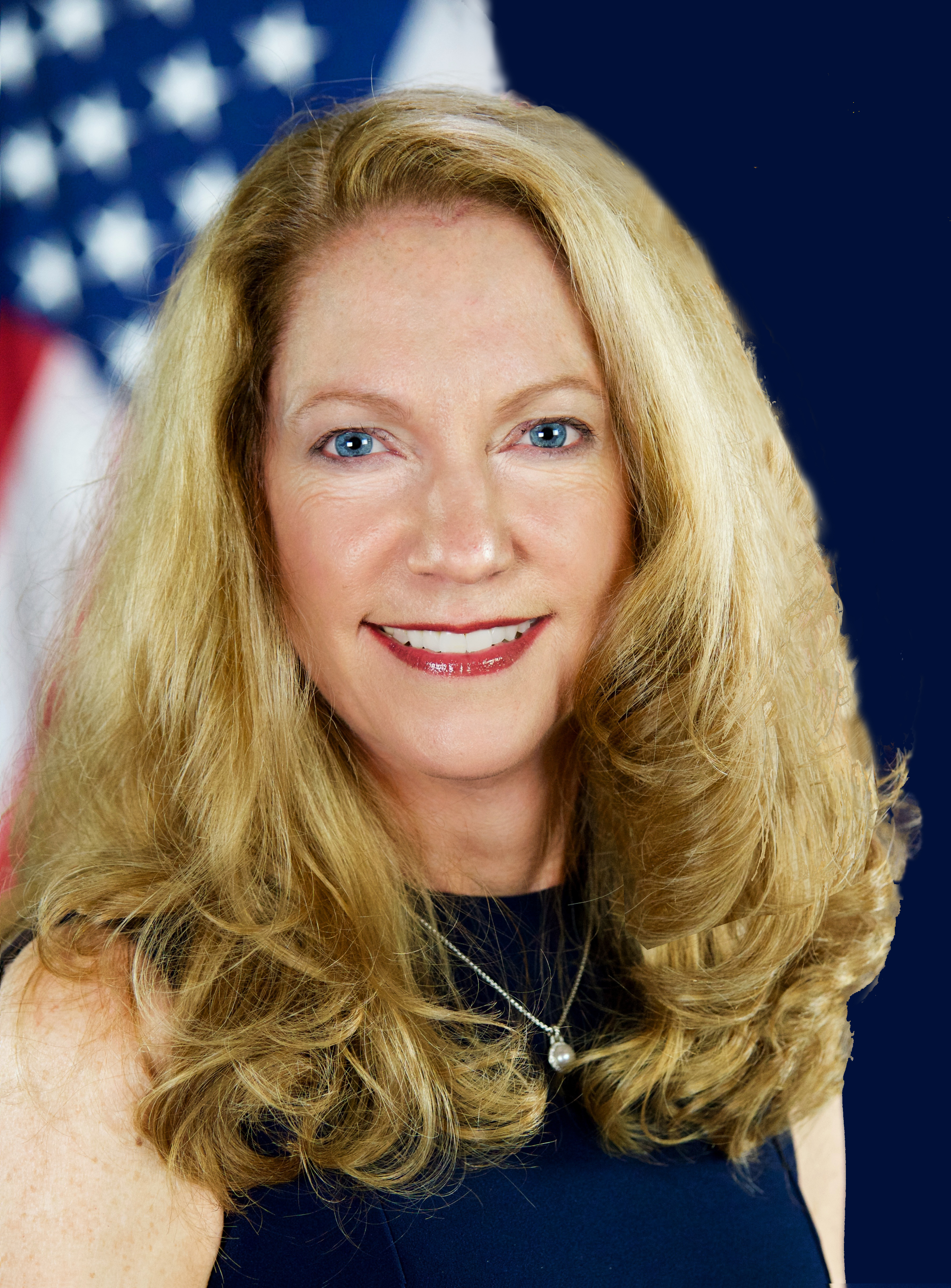

Deputy Administrator of the Small Business Administration
- In office August 3, 2017 – April 15, 2018
- President: Donald Trump
- Preceded by: Douglas Kramer
- Succeeded by: Dilawar Syed

Personal details
- Born: Althea Helen Coetzee; 1963 (age 62–63)
- Spouse: DeWayne Leslie
- Education: United States Naval Academy; National University

Military service
- Branch/service: United States Navy; United States Navy Reserve
- Rank: Rear Admiral

Althea Helen "Allie" Coetzee Leslie (born 1963) is a retired rear admiral in the United States Navy who served as Deputy Administrator of the Small Business Administration from August 2017 to April 2018. Prior to her role with the Small Business Administration, she served as Chief of Staff to the Under Secretary of Defense for Acquisition, Technology and Logistics. Coetzee was confirmed as Deputy Administrator of the Small Business Administration by the U.S. Senate on August 3, 2017. She resigned as the Deputy Administrator on April 15, 2018.

== Career ==
Coetzee graduated from the United States Naval Academy in 1985 and was commissioned as a Supply Corps officer. She went on to receive a Master of Business Administration degree from National University. In graduate school, she was awarded the American Jurisprudence Award in Criminal Law. After transitioning to the United States Navy Reserve in 1993, she had a civilian career working in municipal and state government, retail distribution, medical device manufacturing, and the United States Department of Defense. She was recalled to active duty in 2011.

Coetzee's military awards include the Defense Superior Service Medal, Legion of Merit, Defense Meritorious Service Medal, Meritorious Service Medal, Navy and Marine Corps Commendation Medal, and the Navy and Marine Corps Achievement Medal.
