= Dilawar Syed =

Pakistani-American government official

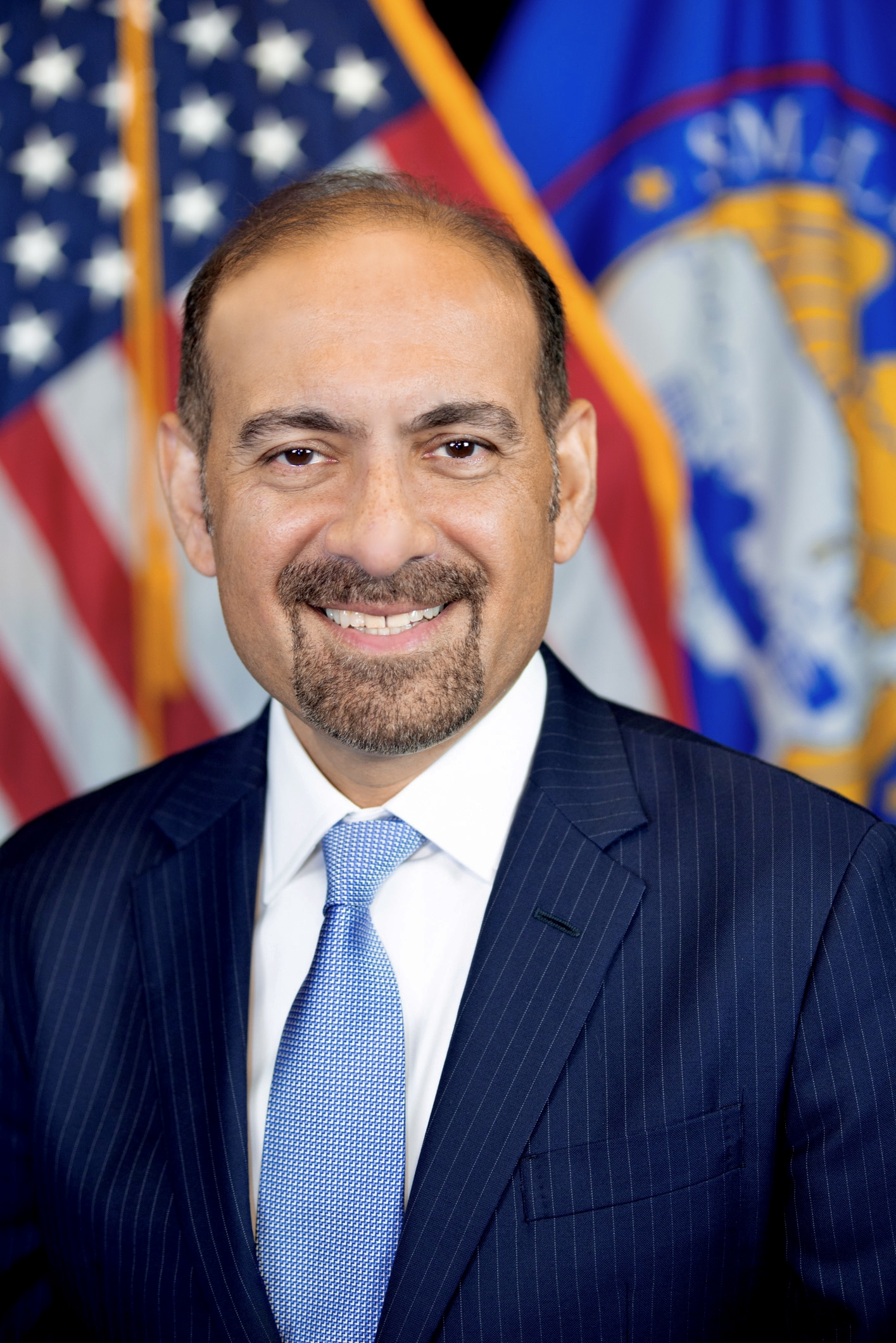

Deputy Administrator of the Small Business Administration
- In office July 10, 2023 – January 20, 2025
- President: Joe Biden
- Preceded by: Althea Coetzee
- Succeeded by: Bill Briggs

Special Representative for Commercial and Business Affairs
- In office February 14, 2022 – July 10, 2023
- President: Joe Biden
- Preceded by: Position established
- Succeeded by: Sarah Morgenthau

Personal details
- Born: Pakistan
- Education: College of Wooster; University of Texas, Austin (BA); University of Pennsylvania (MBA)

Dilawar Syed (born March 7, 1972) is a Pakistani-American businessman, entrepreneur, and government official. He served as Deputy Administrator of the U.S. Small Business Administration from 2023 to 2025. He previously served as Special Representative for Commercial and Business Affairs at the United States Department of State. Prior to federal service, Syed held leadership roles in several technology companies including Freshworks, which would later hold its IPO in September 2021. Syed was recognized as the highest-ranking Muslim American official in the U.S. federal executive branch.

== Early life and education ==
Syed immigrated to the United States from Pakistan as a college student to attend the College of Wooster in Ohio. Syed earned his Bachelor of Arts in economics and computer science from the University of Texas at Austin and a Master of Business Administration from the Wharton School of the University of Pennsylvania.

== Business career ==
Prior to government service, Syed was an entrepreneur for 20 years in the fields of software, health care, and artificial intelligence. As president of Freshworks, Syed helped scale the software company's products to thousands of small and medium-sized businesses. Freshworks would later hold its Initial Public Offering on NASDAQ in September 2021. From 2018 to 2021, Syed was the president and CEO of Lumiata, an artificial intelligence for healthcare company backed by Khosla Ventures. He previously held an executive role at Yahoo! Inc.

== Public service ==
Syed’s public service started in 2010 when he was appointed by President Barack Obama to serve as a commissioner on the White House Initiative on Asian Americans and Pacific Islanders (AAPIs) where he served as chair of its Economic Growth committee. In that role, Syed led the Obama Administration's engagement with AAPI small businesses after the passage of the American Recovery and Reinvestment Act of 2009. He served as that Committee's liaison with the U.S. Small Business Administration and the United States Department of Commerce President's Export Council.

In 2019, Syed was the founding chair of the California Entrepreneurship Task Force (ETF) "to connect rural regions such as the San Joaquin Valley with networks and resources in Silicon Valley." Housed within the Governor's Office of Business and Economic Development, the task force served as an important state resource for small businesses impacted by the COVID-19 pandemic. Syed also served as a member of the Silicon Valley Recovery Roundtable, which was tasked with helping lead the region's economic recovery.

=== Special Representative for Commercial and Business Affairs ===
==== Appointment ====
In February 2022, President Joe Biden appointed Syed as Special Representative for Commercial and Business affairs in the Bureau of Economic and Business Affairs at the Department of State. As Special Representative, he drove commercial diplomacy and advances trade, commercial, and economic policies for American companies and workers.

Commercial and economic engagement

Syed led commercial diplomacy at the State Department. In 2022 alone, Syed represented the United States in "more than 60 bilateral meetings, expanding fair market access for U.S. businesses, increasing US intellectual property protections, promoting roughly $90 billion worth of commercial deals, and creating thousands of U.S. jobs.” In his first overseas visit in March 2022, Syed joined Commerce Secretary Gina Raimondo and Senator Roy Blunt on a presidential delegation to commemorate U.S. National Day at the Expo 2020 Dubai.

In July 2022, Syed visited South Asia, touring India, Pakistan, and Bangladesh. In India, he emphasized the potential of U.S.-India trade to ease global supply chain challenges, saying that "India can play a big role in plugging the gaps in emerging areas such as semiconductors, pharma, and renewable energy".

In September 2022, Syed co-chaired economic dialogue between the U.S. and the United Arab Emirates in Abu Dhabi. This covered a breadth of topics including sanctions, Open RAN 5G technology, cybersecurity, the digital economy and interoperability, women’s economic empowerment, intellectual property, clean energy initiatives, food and water security, global health security, and health cooperation.

In a November 2022 visit to Japan, Syed pushed for the "revival of the semiconductor industry" in Japan to help alleviate microchip supply chain challenges.

==== Iraq business delegation ====
In June 2023, Syed led the U.S.–Iraq Business Council delegation to Iraq, the first commercial delegation to the country since 2018. Syed held meetings with Iraq's Prime Minister, several cabinet ministers, the Iraqi private sector. The visit took place "amid growing interest from U.S. companies in doing business in Iraq" after Iraq passed its highest-ever national budget worth $150 billion, setting aside expenditure for infrastructure. The delegation included companies in the construction, education, energy, finance, health, and technology sectors.

Competition with global powers

Syed visited Portugal in May 2023 to promote U.S. commercial investments, particularly in Lithium processing. He challenged "reliance on untrusted Chinese state-owned companies for critical infrastructure [which] threatens our shared security and values, as well as undermines the free market". Syed asked for the Portuguese to reconsider their commercial relationships with China, stating "[the U.S. wants] our friends in Portugal to make these decisions fully aware of the risks of working with the PRC".

The same month, Syed visited West Africa. In Gabon, he said "Africa belongs to Africans, and not to any power" and pushed for private investment from the U.S. in the country. In Cabo Verde, he also pushed for American investments in digital infrastructure, the maritime industry, and energy.

Domestic commercial diplomacy

Syed launched the "Commercial Diplomacy USA Tour" in 2022, a multi-state tour to democratize “access to U.S. government programs in underserved regions and applying a whole-of-government approach to commercial diplomacy” with stops in Irvine, California, Reno, Nevada, Houston, Texas and Detroit, Michigan. He stressed the importance of “strategic competition in critical sectors and emphasized the importance of entrepreneurship and innovation to America’s global leadership”. Syed’s visit showcased industries such as biotech and auto design in Irvine and Orange County. In Reno, he met with Hillary Schieve and industry leaders to emphasize Nevada’s role in boosting local lithium production and closing the lithium supply chain gap with China. In Houston, the U.S. Chamber of Commerce hosted Syed for a discussion on the role of U.S. suppliers in the global energy sector and to ensure energy security.

=== Deputy Administrator of the Small Business Administration ===
Nomination

On March 3, 2021, President Joe Biden nominated Syed to be Deputy Administrator of the U.S. Small Business Administration. He was renominated to the post on January 3, 2023. Following the 2022 elections, Democrats secured a one-seat majority on the Small Business and Entrepreneurship Committee and voted to advance his nomination on March 22, 2023. This followed nearly two years of delaying attempts by Republican members of the committee. In June 2021 his nomination had been favorably voted out of the Committee in a voice vote but the parliamentarian ruled a roll call vote was required. Since then, Republican members repeatedly did not attend committee meetings denying the quorum needed to take a roll call vote on his nomination in the committee, which was at that point evenly split between Republicans and Democrats. Republicans conditioned his roll call vote on the SBA taking action on loans Planned Parenthood affiliates received under the Trump Administration. Republicans suggested that Syed's Muslim faith and work with Emgage Action implied he might be anti-Israel, but Jewish and other religious and civil rights organizations defended Syed, and GOP senators discontinued this allegation. On June 8, Syed was confirmed by the full Senate with bipartisan support. He was sworn into office on July 10, 2023.

Syed's nomination was backed by more than 200 business, civil rights, and faith groups. In addition, he was endorsed by the United States Chamber of Commerce. As of 2024, he is the highest ranking Muslim-American in the Biden-Harris Administration.

Small business policy priorities

In a July 2024 interview with the Economic Development Growth Engine for Memphis & Shelby County, Syed described his focus as SBA Deputy Administrator as ensuring "access to resources, SBA-backed loans, and contracting opportunities" and showing up in under-served communities. When interviewed by the Daily Memphian, he emphasized his outreach to underserved communities, saying, "I like to spend time in places where people don’t know about SBA resources." He joined Vice President Kamala Harris during a visit to Detroit in May 2024 during her Economic Opportunity Tour, which focused on auto industry workforce support, and small business growth.

Syed prioritized rural communities in his public engagements. He hosted the National Small Business Week tour, starting in Rapid City, South Dakota. In an interview with South Dakota Public Broadcasting, he stated, "we don't have equity across all regions, and you see this divide between rural and metro." In August 2024, Syed completed an Alaska visit that included tribal consultations and meetings with the Alaska Native corporation focused on expanding federal contracting opportunities.

During a visit to a local business accelerator in Indianapolis, Syed called out the systemic barriers and persistent equity gaps that face minority entrepreneurs, noting that Indiana has "only 1,750 black-owned businesses [with] employees" despite the state being home to more than 500,000 small businesses.

Federal disaster response

As Deputy Administrator, Syed helped coordinate federal disaster recovery efforts following major natural disasters. In October 2024, he traveled to Marion, North Carolina, Savannah and Valdosta, Georgia, and other Southeast cities to assess Hurricane Helene damage and survivor needs. While announcing an expansion of SBA disaster recovery centers, he emphasized focused outreach to historically underserved communities.

Syed was among the first senior government officials to raise concerns about funding availability for SBA disaster loans following widespread damage from Hurricanes Helene and Milton, advocating for Congressional action to appropriate additional funding.

He visited Baltimore to highlight aid available for small business owners after the Francis Scott Key Bridge collapse.

== Post-federal service work ==
After leaving the Biden administration, Syed accepted appointments at the University of Texas at Austin to serve as senior economic policy advisor and faculty member at the Lyndon B. Johnson School of Public Affairs and McCombs School of Business.

Syed has spoken out about how Trump administration trade policies have impacted small businesses, noting that policy unpredictability creates a "whiplash effect" for the 97% of U.S. importers that qualify as small businesses. He argued that "for these companies, tariff uncertainty isn't just frustrating—it's paralyzing," and called for government support to help businesses navigate shifting trade policy.

In July 2025, Syed responded to comments by Sequoia Capital partner Shaun Maguire about New York City Democratic mayoral nominee Zohran Mamdani. Calling the remarks "Islamophobic," Syed questioned whether entrepreneurs would "feel welcome in this environment" and called for technology leaders to speak out against bigotry. More than 900 tech founders later signed an open letter citing concerns about the incident's impact on Silicon Valley.

Political offices
Preceded by Althea Coetzee	Deputy Administrator of the Small Business Administration; 2023–present	Incumbent
