= California Governor's Office of Business and Economic Development =

Economic development office in California, USA

The Governor's Office of Business and Economic Development (GO-Biz) was created by Governor Jerry Brown Jr. in 2012. GO-Biz serves as the State of California's leader for job growth and economic development efforts. GO-Biz offers a range of services to business owners, including attraction, retention and expansion services, site selection, permit streamlining, clearing of regulatory hurdles, small business assistance, international trade development, assistance with state government, and more.

As part of the governor's 2012 budget, the elements of economic development under GO-Biz were realigned to put a stronger emphasis on job creation and promoting California as a place to do business.

== History ==
The California Technology, Trade, and Commerce Agency (TTCA) was established in 1992 under the governorship of Pete Wilson. The agency operated trade offices in 12 locations worldwide, with seven offices being operated by state employees while five others were operated by contracted consultants. Following the passage of AB 1757, the agency and its trade offices were shut down in 2004 due to budgetary and logistical concerns, with its operations transferred to the California Business, Transportation and Housing Agency (BTH). In 2010, Jerry Brown signed an executive order to establish the Office of Business and Economic Development, which was then codified in 2012 through AB 29, which coincided with the breakup of the BTH into the California State Transportation Agency and the California Business, Consumer Services and Housing Agency through the Governor's Reorganization Plan No. 2. Upon the signing of AB 29, Brown announced the opening of a trade office in China under GO-Biz.

== Innovation and Entrepreneurship ==
The Innovation and Entrepreneurship Department was created by GO-Biz to facilitate and promote innovation in the state of California. This department accomplishes their goals and visions through the Innovation Hub (iHub) Program which is known as "the largest innovation network in the country". Currently, there are 15 iHubs located throughout California, such as in San Francisco, Fresno and Los Angeles. iHub's primary goal is to ensure that California is a place where ideas can be transformed into innovations and successful businesses in the market force. This in turn promotes job creation, boosts long-term economic activity and attracts entrepreneurship in various economic sectors such as medical technology, information technology, agriculture and life sciences.

In efforts to promote entrepreneurship, innovation and job creation, GO-Biz has partnered with California's higher education system such as the University of California. Events are held on many UC campuses where speakers have the opportunity to speak about topics of their choice as it pertains to business and innovation. Members of the events include but are not limited to "venture capitalists, students, faculty, and local businesses". Having a platform where like-minded individuals can discuss and explore creative ideas "expands its potential to produce innovation that leads to new business growth".

== Programs ==
- Business Development
- California Competes Tax Credit
- Community and Local Equity Grants Unit
- Energy and Climate Unit
- International Affairs and Trade
- Innovation and Emerging Technologies
- Office of Regional Economic Development Initiatives
- Office of Small Business Advocate – CalOSBA
- Office of Zero Emission Vehicle Market Development
