= Art Directors Club Hall of Fame =

Honor for design and creative professionals

- Native name: ADC Hall of Fame
- Description: Honoring lifetime achievements in art direction and visual communications
- Country: United States
- Presented by: The One Club for Creativity (formerly ADC of New York)

The Art Directors Club Hall of Fame was established in 1971, by the Art Directors Club of New York, a professional organization in the design and creative industries. The Art Directors Club selects its honorees from those "who have made significant contributions to art direction and visual communications, and whose lifetime achievements represent the highest standards of creative excellence."

In addition to designers usually notable within the communities of design and advertising, the honorees include more popular artists who have affected the broader field of visual culture, including, for example, Issey Miyake, Jim Henson and Andy Warhol.

On its website, the Art Directors Club maintains a biography of each of the Hall of Fame honorees.

In a video shown at the 2010 Hall of Fame gala, George Lois speaks a little bit about the award and its history. In the video, Lois calls the Hall of Fame honors "the Oscars of the advertising business."

== 2010s ==
=== 2012 ===
The 2012 Hall of Fame Benefit Gala was held on October 5, 2012, in Manhattan.

- Barry Blitt
- David Droga
- Mary Ellen Mark
- Kevin O'Callaghan
- Deborah Sussman

=== 2011 ===
The 2011 black-tie gala was held on November 10, 2011, and was emceed by Steve Heller. Christoph Niemann provided illustrations for publicity of the Hall of Fame gala and associated exhibition. Jennica Johnstone designed the invitations and associated assets.

- Ruth Ansel, 2011
- Marshall Arisman, 2011
- John C Jay, 2011
- Joe Pytka, 2011
- Paola Antonelli, 2011

=== 2010 ===
The 2010 Hall of Fame gala was held on Thursday, November 4, 2010, at the Art Directors Club on West 29th Street. Pentagram designed the invitations for the 2010 Hall of Fame gala ceremony, using Matthew Carter's Carter Sans typeface.

- Fabien Baron, 2010
- Matthew Carter, 2010
- Philip Hays, 2010
- Jessica Helfand and William Drenttel, 2010
- George Nelson, 2010
- Christoph Niemann, 2010
- Dan Wieden, 2010
- Brigitte Lacombe, 2010

== 2000s ==
=== 2008 ===
Six Hall of Fame laureates were inducted at a black-tie gala at the ADC Gallery in New York on November 6, 2008. The benefit gala was emceed by John Hockenberry and was one part of a week of activities all taking place at the ADC Gallery.

- Alex Bogusky, 2008
- Sir John Hegarty, 2008
- Ray Eames, 2008
- Maira Kalman, 2008
- John Maeda, 2008
- R. Roger Remington, 2008
- Bruce Weber, 2008

=== 2006 ===
2006's Hall of Fame laureates were inducted at a gala black-tie dinner at the ADC Gallery in New York on Thursday, October 12.

- Janet Froelich, 2006
- Issey Miyake, 2006
- Nicholas Negroponte, 2006
- Nancy Rice, 2006
- Art Spiegelman, 2006
- Bert Stern, 2006

=== 2004 ===
- Jerry Andelin, 2004
- Jay Chiat, 2004
- Muriel Cooper, 2004
- Louise Fili, 2004
- Al Hirschfeld, 2004
- Bruce McCall, 2004
- Duane Michals, 2004
- Edward Tufte, 2004
- Tibor Kalman, 2004

=== 2003 ===
- Michael Bierut, 2003
- André François, 2003
- David Kennedy, 2003
- Richard Saul Wurman, 2003

=== 2001–2002 ===
- Rich Silverstein, 2001–2002
- Giorgio Soavi, 2001–2002
- Edward Sorel, 2001–2002
- Philip Meggs, 2001–2002

=== 2000 ===
- Edward Benguiat, 2000
- Pablo Ferro, 2000
- Joe Sedelmaier, 2000
- Tadanori Yokoo, 2000

== 1990s ==
=== 1999 ===
- R. O. Blechman, 1999
- Annie Leibovitz, 1999
- Stan Richards, 1999
- Richard Wilde, 1999

=== 1998 ===
- Tom Geismar, 1998
- Chuck Jones, 1998
- Paula Scher, 1998
- Alex Steinweiss, 1998
- Red Burns, 1998

=== 1997 ===
- Allan Beaver, 1997
- Sheila Metzner, 1997
- B. Martin Pedersen, 1997
- George Tscherny, 1997

=== 1996 ===
- Bill McCaffery, 1996
- Erik Nitsche, 1996
- Arnold Varga, 1996
- Fred Woodward, 1996
- Steve Heller, 1996

=== 1995 ===
- Robert Brownjohn, 1995
- Paul Davis, 1995
- Jay Maisel, 1995
- Roy Kuhlman, 1995

=== 1994 ===
- Alan Fletcher, 1994
- Norman Rockwell, 1994
- Ikko Tanaka, 1994
- Rochelle Udell, 1994
- Andy Warhol, 1994

=== 1993 ===
- Leo Burnett, 1993
- Yusaku Kamekura, 1993
- Robert Wilvers, 1993
- Howard Zieff, 1993

=== 1992 ===
- Eiko Ishioka, 1992
- Rick Levine, 1992
- Onofrio Paccione, 1992
- Gordon Parks, 1992

=== 1991 ===
- Jim Henson, 1991
- Bea Feitler, 1991
- Bob Gill, 1991
- Bob Giraldi, 1991
- Richard Hess, 1991

=== 1990 ===
- Robert Weaver, 1990
- Lee Clow, 1990
- Reba Sochis, 1990
- Frank Zachary, 1990

== 1980s ==
=== 1989 ===
- Rudolph de Harak, 1989
- Herschel Levit, 1989
- Raymond Loewy, 1989

=== 1988 ===
The New York Times reported that three inductees were to be honored on the evening of October 21, 1988. The Art Directors Club listing of Hall of Fame honorees includes those three inductees and a fourth, Silas Rhodes.

- Silas Rhodes, 1988
- Ben Shahn, 1988
- Bert Steinhauser, 1988
- Mike Tesch, 1988

=== 1987 ===
The New York Times reported that four inductees were to be honored on the evening of October 23, 1987, at the Waldorf Astoria in New York. The Art Directors Club listing of Hall of Fame honorees includes those four inductees and a fifth, Leon Friend.

- Willy Fleckhaus, 1987
- Leon Friend, 1987
- Shigeo Fukuda, 1987
- Steve Horn, 1987
- Tony Palladino, 1987

=== 1986 ===
- Walt Disney, 1986
- Roy Grace, 1986
- Alvin Lustig, 1986
- Arthur Paul, 1986

=== 1985 ===
- Art Kane, 1985
- Len Sirowitz, 1985
- Charles Tudor, 1985

=== 1984 ===
- Charles Eames, 1984
- Wallace Elton, 1984
- Sam Scali, 1984
- Louis Silverstein, 1984

=== 1983 ===
- Bill Bernbach, 1983
- Aaron Burns, 1983
- Seymour Chwast, 1983
- Steve Frankfurt, 1983

=== 1982 ===
According to an article in The New York Times, the 1982 Hall of Fame laureates were inducted at a dinner at the Pierre Hotel in November 1982 in Manhattan.

- Richard Avedon, 1982
- Amil Gargano, 1982
- Jerome Snyder, 1982
- Massimo Vignelli, 1982

=== 1981 ===
According to The New York Times, the 1981 Hall of Fame laureates were inducted at an event at the Pierre Hotel.

- Lucian Bernhard, 1981
- Ivan Chermayeff, 1981
- György Kepes, 1981
- George Krikorian, 1981
- William Taubin, 1981

=== 1980 ===
- Gene Federico, 1980
- Otto Storch, 1980
- Henry Wolf, 1980

== 1970s ==
=== 1979 ===
- W. A. Dwiggins, 1979
- George Giusti, 1979
- Milton Glaser, 1979
- Helmut Krone, 1979
- Willem Sandberg, 1979
- Ladislav Sutnar, 1979
- Jan Tschichold, 1979

=== 1978 ===
- Thomas M. Cleland, 1978
- Louis Dorfsman, 1978
- Allen Hurlburt, 1978
- George Lois, 1978

=== 1977 ===
- Saul Bass, 1977
- Herb Lubalin, 1977
- Bradbury Thompson, 1977

=== 1976 ===
- E. McKnight Kauffer, 1976
- Herbert Matter, 1976

=== 1975 ===
- Gordon Aymar, 1975
- Herbert Bayer, 1975
- Cipe Pineles Burtin, 1975
- Heyworth Campbell, 1975
- Alexander Liberman, 1975
- László Moholy-Nagy, 1975

=== 1974 ===
- Will Burtin, 1974
- Leo Lionni, 1974
- Edward McCabe, 1974
- Shirley Polykoff, 1974

=== 1973 ===
- Charles Coiner, 1973
- Paul Smith, 1973
- Jack Tinker, 1973

=== 1972 ===
- M.F. Agha, 1972
- Lester Beall, 1972
- Alexey Brodovitch, 1972
- A. M. Cassandre, 1972
- Rene Clarke, 1972
- Robert Gage, 1972
- William Golden, 1972
- Paul Rand, 1972

== See also ==
- List of AIGA medalists
- Masters Series (School of Visual Arts)
