= Paul Brooks Davis =

American artist (born 1938)

- Born: 1938 (age 87–88); Centrahoma, Oklahoma, United States
- Other name: Paul Davis
- Education: Will Rogers High School; School of Visual Arts
- Occupation: Graphic artist
- Spouse: Elise Hepburn (married 1959-1964) Myrna Mushkin (married 1965-present)
- Children: John Davis (1) Matthew Davis (2)

Paul Brooks Davis (a.k.a. Paul Davis, born 1938) is an American graphic artist.

== Biography ==
Paul Brooks Davis, better known as Paul Davis, was born in 1938 in Centrahoma, Oklahoma. The middle of three children born to Howard Davis, a Methodist minister, and Susan Brookhart Davis, he spent his childhood in small towns: Caddo, Jenks, Hartshorne and Antlers, in Oklahoma, as well as Sulphur Springs, Arkansas; Ellis, Kansas; and, briefly, Great Falls, Montana. He attended Woodrow Wilson Junior High School (Tulsa, Oklahoma), and later, Will Rogers High School in Tulsa, where his talent was nurtured by his art teachers–Mr. Higgins in 8th grade, Ms. Ownby in 9th, and Hortense Bateholts at Will Rogers. While in high school, Davis, with friends Russell Myers and Archie Goodwin formed a cartoonist's club that met daily at the Owl Drugstore at 11th Street and Pittsburg in Tulsa. Davis won a scholarship at the age of 17 to the School of Visual Arts, still called the Cartoonists and Illustrators School, on a scholarship from Scholastic Arts Magazine and moved to New York. "It wasn’t very well known, but I had read about it in a comic book," Davis said. There, he studied with outstanding illustrators Philip Hays and Robert Weaver, and graphic designer and artist George Tscherny.

While in New York he had his first marriage in 1959 to aspiring actress-singer Elise Hepburn, which produced his son John. The divorced in 1964. He also married former Push Pin colleague Myrna Mushkin in 1965, and their son Matthew was born in 1967.

== Career ==
While still a student, Davis produced his first commissioned illustration, a pencil drawing that appeared in the October 1959 issue of Playboy magazine. After finishing his courses at School of Visual Arts, he was hired by Milton Glaser and Seymour Chwast, partners in the groundbreaking Push Pin Studios. A series of his target paintings was the subject of issue 32 (1961) of the studio's publication, The Push Pin Graphic. He then illustrated "A Bestiary" of famous people, conceived and written by artist Edward Sorel, which appeared in the July 1962 issue of Horizon magazine.

Davis's work quickly caught the imagination of art directors in the U.S. and abroad, and he was soon in demand as an illustrator for magazines, record album covers, book jackets, and advertising. He formed the Paul Davis Studio in 1963, working first in New York and later in Sag Harbor on Long Island. His style had a tremendous impact on the field of illustration. His illustrations have appeared in Life, Time, Playboy, Look, The Saturday Evening Post, Sports Illustrated, Evergreen Review, Harper's, Harper's Bazaar, Horizon, McCall's, Show, Esquire, The New Republic, New York, The New York Times, The New Yorker, Mirabella, Fast Company, Worth, Money and many other publications.

He was Art Director of Joseph Papp's New York Shakespeare Festival from 1984 to 1992. Other clients include UNITE!, Disney, Lincoln Center, McKinsey & Co., Rolling Stone, Yahoo, Adobe and A&E Television.

In 1968, Davis was invited by Galerie Delpire in Paris, France, to have his first solo exhibition of paintings, and in 1977, Gilles deBure, curator of the Galerie d'Actualité in the Centre Georges Pompidou, presented a solo exhibition of Davis's work as part of the museum's opening festivities. Davis's distinctive paintings and posters for advertising, publishing and entertainment also have been the subject of museum and gallery exhibitions throughout Japan and Italy, and in cities around the U.S., including a retrospective in 1988 at the Philbrook Museum of Art in his native Tulsa, where then Governor Frank Keating declared the opening date of his exhibition the "Paul Davis Day."

Davis's work is included in collections throughout the world, and poster collection of MoMa in New York. In 1987, The Drama Desk created a special award to recognize Davis's iconic posters for Joseph Papp's Public Theater, and he is in the Hall of Fame of both the Art Directors Club and the Society of Illustrators. He is also a recipient of the coveted AIGA Medal, and of honorary doctorates from School of Visual Arts and the Maryland Institute College of Art. He is a Fellow of the American Academy in Rome and a vice-president of their Society of Fellows.

== Awards ==
- 1988 Gold Medal from the Society of Illustrators
- Silver and Gold medal from the Art Directors Club of New York
- Silver Medal from Primera Bienal de Artes Graficas in Columbia
- Bronze medal from the VIII Poster Biennale in Warsaw
- Special Drama Desk Award for his outstanding theater posters
- Honorary doctorates from School of Visual Arts and the Maryland Institute College of Art.
- Fellow of the American Academy in Rome.
- 2009 Society of Illustrators Hall of Fame
- 2012 Will Rogers High School Hall of Fame

== Artwork appearing in film, television and music ==
Davis's artwork has appeared in many movies and TV shows. When Richard Dreyfuss and Marsha Mason share an apartment in The Goodbye Girl, it is decorated with Davis's poster for the New York Shakespeare Festival production of Henry V. Davis's poster of Che Guevara appears both in Brian De Palma's Hi, Mom! and Rob Cohen's A Small Circle of Friends.

In the 1993 film adaptation of John Guare's Six Degrees of Separation, Davis's mural for New York City's Arcadia restaurant is featured. Paul's iconic poster for the Public Theater production of Three Penny Opera is on the wall of Jonathan Eliot's apartment in the NBC sitcom The Single Guy. In the 2009 film Precious, Paul's poster for the 1975 production of Ntozake Shange's For Colored Girls adorns the teacher's apartment.

In a classroom scene in A Nightmare on Elm Street (1984), Davis' poster for The Cherry Orchard hangs on the wall. Davis created album artwork for two Chiaroscuro Records releases: Gene Krupa's Jazz at the New School and Summit Reunion's Yellow Dog Blues.
