= Robert Weaver (illustrator) =

American illustrator (1924–1994)

Robert Weaver (July 5, 1924 – September 4, 1994) was an American illustrator who was considered a pioneer of a contemporary approach to the field that began in the 1950s.

== Biography ==
Beginning in 1952, he embarked on a mission to combine the visual ideas found in fine art with the responsibility of journalist. At the time, many practitioners of illustration were expected to paint and draw for advertising and magazine assignments with artwork that was conservative, idealized and saccharine, while other illustrators such as Ronald Searle, Arthur Szyk, George Grosz, Kathe Kollwitz and later Ralph Steadman and Tomi Ungerer injected their own opinion into the matter. Weaver joined this latter tradition by moving his role of an illustrator from a page decorator to a journalist. He ventured from the typical haven of an illustrator's studio into the world and used a pencil to observe, record facts, and draw real life based visual essays, the way that illustrators such as Burt Silverman and Franklin McMahon did. This approach would later be termed "visual journalism" and in 1983 would form the basis of a special masters degree, Illustration as Visual Essay, from the School of Visual Arts in New York.

He died at his home in Manhattan on September 4, 1994.

== Career and legacy ==
In an article for the AIGA in 1990, noted graphic art historian Steve Heller categorized Weaver as a journalistic illustrator. Other artists included Bob Gill, Jack Beck, Robert Andrew Parker, Thomas B. Allen and Philip Hays. They received crucial assignments from a group of visionary art directors that included Cipe Pineles, Leo Lionni, Otto Storch and Henry Wolf.

For five decades, Weaver created work for clients such as Esquire, Fortune, Sports Illustrated, Life, Look, The New York Times and Columbia Records. These patrons allowed him to cover stories with the same mission afforded a photojournalist, such as the time he covered John F. Kennedy's campaign. He illustrated using pencil and acrylic paint on paper.

Known for bringing the narrative qualities of cinematic storytelling to his profession, Weaver once said, "Life is not a single snapshot, it is a series of events that are chain linked and proceed frame by frame."

== Sources ==
- A Master of Change by Steven Heller, 1990, AIGA article on Paul Davis
- Exhibition essay, Seeing Is Not Believing: Norman Rockwell Museum
