= David C. Levy =

American museum director (born 1938)

David C. Levy (born 1938) is an educator, museum director, art historian and artist, designer/photographer, and musician. He is a principal in the consulting group, Objective Focus LLP. He was President of the Education Division of Cambridge Information Group from 2007 to 2018, and President of Sotheby's Institute of Art and founding Chairman of Bach to Rock. He was president and Director of the Corcoran Gallery of Art and Corcoran College of Art and Design in Washington, DC, from 1991 to 2005, and Chancellor of The New School for Social Research in New York City from 1989 to 1991. From 1970 to 1989 Levy was Executive Dean and CEO of Parsons School of Design. He holds a bachelor's degree from Columbia College, Columbia University and a master's degree and PhD from New York University.

== Early life ==
Born in Brooklyn Heights, to artist parents Edgar Levy and Lucille Corcos, Levy moved at age three with his family to an 18th-century farmhouse on South Mountain Road in Rockland County, New York. “The Road” had been settled by a group of well-known artists, writers, musicians, and actors including John Houseman, Milton Caniff, Maxwell Anderson, Kurt Weill, Lotte Lenya, Hugo Robus, Morris Kantor, and Henry Varnum Poor. Thus, at an early age Levy was immersed in a creative community that also included his parents’ New York friends - his godparents, the sculptors David Smith and his wife, Dorothy Dehner, as well as the painters John Graham, Richard Lindner, Arshile Gorky, Vaclav Vytlacil, Mark Rothko (Marcus Rothkowitz), I. Rice Pereira; designers William Golden, Cipe Pineles, Will Burtin; and architect/historian James Marston Fitch.

== Education ==
Levy had planned on a conservatory education but, influenced by family-friend and neighbor, the philosopher Charles Frankel, he attended Columbia University’s Columbia College where he majored in philosophy with an emphasis on aesthetics and art history, graduating in 1960. After Columbia, Levy attended New York University’s Institute of Fine Arts and the university’s SENAP division, from which he received a master's degree and a PhD in organizational theory. His doctoral dissertation was an analysis of the failure of Parsons School of Design in the 1960s and of the strategies and history that underlay its merger with The New School for Social Research.

== Parsons School of Design ==
In 1962, Levy was appointed Director of Admissions at Parsons School of Design, becoming the school’s vice president in 1968. Following the resignation of Parsons’ president in 1969 and the imminent prospect of Parsons’ insolvency, Parsons’ trustees instructed Levy to close the school. Instead, he negotiated a merger with The New School for Social Research. Under Levy's stewardship, over the following two decades Parsons grew from a small, struggling, non-degree-granting trade school into one of the largest and most diversified visual arts colleges in the United States, offering multiple undergraduate and graduate degrees in a diverse range of visual arts disciplines. During Levy's 19-year tenure as its CEO, Parsons became an international college of the arts, with campuses in Los Angeles, France, The Dominican Republic, and Japan. Parson's enrollment grew from 480 in 1970 to 12,000 by the early 1980s, and it became the principal financial support for its parent university, The New School. Levy developed and often wrote curricula for more than 30 new bachelor's and master's degrees as well as for continuing education offerings in every visual arts discipline. He taught Art History at Parsons and SUNY and created special programs for arts education and research in Italy, West Africa, Israel, Japan, Russia, the United Kingdom, and Greece.

=== The Otis Art Institute of Parsons School of Design ===
In 1979, Levy negotiated Parsons’ annexation of The Otis Art Institute of Los Angeles County, renaming it The Otis Art Institute of Parsons School of Design (now Otis College of Art and Design) and creating a bicoastal college of the arts. This was the first (and maybe the only) time in American higher education in which a private educational entity absorbed a public institution. The Otis/Parsons partnership spanned a very successful 12 years; ending when Otis become an independent privately supported college, shortly after Levy's 1991 departure from Parsons and The New School to head Washington, DC's Corcoran Gallery and College of Art.

=== The New School of Jazz and Contemporary Music and Mannes College of Music ===
In 1987, Levy established The New School for Jazz and Contemporary Music. He wrote the school's initial curriculum and, with the help of his musical collaborator, saxophonist Arnie Lawrence, recruited a faculty of jazz artists including Sir Roland Hanna, Tommy Flannigan, Chico Hamilton, Jimmy Heath, Donald Byrd, Reggie Workman, and Red Mitchell. Offering New York's first undergraduate degree in jazz, the school has since grown to become internationally recognized as one of the most influential conservatories in its discipline.

In 1989, during his tenure as The New School's Chancellor, Levy and his colleagues merged the Mannes College of Music into the university's community of schools.

== The Corcoran Gallery of Art ==
In January 1991, Levy became president and Director of the Corcoran Gallery of Art and its college of art, the Corcoran College of Art and Design. The Corcoran is the third oldest museum in the United States and Washington, DC's oldest art institution.

Levy took the Corcoran's helm amidst the aftershocks of a national firestorm created in 1989 when the museum cancelled a politically controversial exhibition of photographs by Robert Mapplethorpe. One of the sparks that ignited the “culture wars” of the early 1990s, the Mapplethorpe incident decimated the Corcoran's constituency of supporters, wrecked its attendance, and seriously threatened its future financial viability.

Over his 14-year tenure, Levy rebuilt both the museum and its college of art, mounting more than 300 exhibitions and expanding the museum's 1990 attendance of 80,000 to just under one million by 2004. He increased the Corcoran's assets from $8–22 million, led a capital campaign that raised $110 million, increased its membership by 600 percent, and doubled the college's undergraduate enrollment. He created the school's first master's level graduate programs, acquiring and restoring an historic 19th century Georgetown schoolhouse to house them.

=== Delaware College of Art and Design (DCAD) ===
In 1995–1996, responding to a request by a public/private partnership in Wilmington, Delaware, to create a college of art in the city's downtown center, Levy and Corcoran Dean, Sammy Hoi, developed a strategic plan, helped raise local funds, and formed a partnership between the Corcoran and New York's Pratt Institute, to co-found and manage the Delaware College of Art and Design, a two-year school of art. DCAD also provided an articulated transfer path for students wishing to continue their studies and complete a four-year degree in either Washington, DC, or New York City. The school thrives today and the Corcoran/Pratt partnership continues to exemplify innovation in higher education and the arts.

=== Proposed Frank Gehry Wing of the Corcoran ===
In the first years of the 21st century, architect Frank Gehry was retained to create a new and final wing for the Corcoran museum and college. The resultant design was received with acclaim and $110 million was raised towards its $160 million cost. Following the collapse of the Internet bubble in 2001-2002 and the untimely death in 2004 of the Corcoran's chairman of the board, the Corcoran board underwent a significant change of leadership and abandoned the Gehry project. As a result, Levy resigned as President/Director, subsequently accepting his current post with Cambridge Information Group.

== Cambridge Information Group (CIG) ==
In 2005, Levy began a consulting relationship with Cambridge Information Group (CIG), and, in 2007, became President of its Education Group and of its graduate school, Sotheby's Institute of Art. At that time, the Institute had campuses in London, Singapore, and New York City. In 2011 Levy created an interdisciplinary degree that combines the study of art business and connoisseurship with hands-on training in interior design grants graduates a master's degree from Sotheby's Institute of Art and an Interior Design Certificate from the New York School of Interior Design. In 2012 Levy established a partnership with Claremont Graduate University in Los Angeles County, creating a third major center for the institute. Sotheby's Institute of Art enrolls approximately 450 full-time students, primarily in programs leading to master's and PhD degrees. In 2007 Levy, with his wife Carole Feld and partner Jeff Levin, founded Bach to Rock (B2R), a chain of music schools with an innovative curriculum based on the formation of small bands and targeted primarily to young people in grades K–12. Under the management of CIG's Education Group, B2R currently operates six schools in the Washington, DC, region and franchises nationally. In 2016 Levy and CIG colleagues created The School of the New York Times, which offers online programs in a variety of disciplines and extensive summer and gap year programs for high school students and recent graduates

== Community service and awards ==
Levy was made a Chevalier des Arts et des Lettres by the Republic of France and in 1995 honored by the NYU School of Education with a "Distinguished Alumni Achievement Award" for his work as an "extraordinary arts administrator, art scholar, performing musician, philosopher and aesthetician." The following year (1996) he was named Washingtonian of the Year by Washingtonian Magazine. As a graphic designer, Levy art-directed some 60 publications annually at Parsons School of Design, many of which won design awards and commendations from such organizations as the New York Art Directors Club and the American Institute of Graphic Design (AIGA). He holds honorary degrees from The New School and Cedar Crest College. He has served as a Commissioner of Arts and Humanities for the District of Columbia, as an advisor to the Smithsonian Institution, and as a trustee of the National Foundation for the Advancement of the Arts, the National Association of Schools of Art and Design, and the National Hospice Foundation. He currently serves on the boards of the Alliance for Young Artists and Writers (The Scholastic Art and Writing Awards) and the Larry Rivers Foundation. He is a member of the Century Association (NY) and the Cosmos Club (Washington, D.C.).

== Personal life ==
Since his late teens, Levy has had a second career as a jazz musician and has played and toured in the United States, Europe, and Asia with some of the leading jazz artists of the 20th century. These have included Jimmy Heath, Chico Hamilton, Junior Mance, Arnie Lawrence, and Donald Byrd. He has also performed with singer Joni Mitchell and with actor/musician George Segal. With his close friend and associate, the artist Larry Rivers, he created The East Thirteenth Street Band, which recorded for both Rizzoli and Atlantic Records, performing throughout the United States in the 1980s and early 1990s. From the 1960s onwards Levy has free-lanced as a photographer and created a photographic body of work on the American industrial landscape that has been exhibited in museums and galleries in the United States and abroad.

In 1959 Levy married graphic designer and design historian, Janet Meyer. They have two children, Thomas William and Jessica Anne Levy. Separated in 1982 and later divorced, Levy married Carole L. Feld, then a vice president at PBS, in 1992. Their son, Alexander Wolf Levy, was born in 1995.

Levy and his family live in Washington, D.C.
