= Steinweiss =

Steinweiss is a surname. Notable people with the surname include:

- Alex Steinweiss (1917–2011), American graphic designer
- Homer Steinweiss (born 1982), American drummer
