= Joseph Binder (graphic designer) =

Austrian graphic designer (1898–1972)

Joseph Binder (March 3, 1898 – June 26, 1972) was an Austrian graphic designer and painter. He is recognized as one of the pioneers of the modern poster, noted for his refined, stylized images and high-impact colors. Some of his best known works include posters for the 1939 New York World's Fair, the U.S. Army Air Corps and the American Red Cross.

== Early life and education ==
Joseph Binder was born in Vienna on March 3, 1898. In 1912 he began a lithography apprenticeship with Waldheim Eberle printers in Vienna and then served in the Austro-Hungarian army during World War I. In 1922 he enrolled at the Vienna School of Arts and Crafts (Kunstgewerbeschüle) where he studied under Berthold Löffler. Binder was influenced by other Viennese Secessionists who taught at the school, including Koloman Moser. While still a student, Binder produced commercial work through a design studio he established with several friends. The studio was named ESBETA after the initials of its founders. One of his early honors included first prize in a poster competition sponsored by the American Red Cross.

In 1924, Binder married Caroline (Carla) Neuschil who supported and championed his designs throughout both their lives.

== Career ==
=== Vienna ===
Joseph Binder's poster for the City of Vienna's Music and Theater Festival, 1924

In 1924 Binder established his own studio, Wiener Graphik, in Vienna. That year he designed a poster for the City of Vienna's Music and Theater Festival. The lithographic poster, which Binder printed himself, was a manifestation of a distinctly Viennese brand of Art Deco and marked a breakthrough in his career. Important commissions followed including those for two coffee companies, Arabia and Julius Meinl.

From 1925 to 1929 he designed posters, packaging and logos for Vienna's premium coffee importer, the Julius Meinl Company. A version of the logo he created is still in use today. Other companies he developed logos for include Thonet, Semperit, and Bensdorp. As early as 1926, the British magazine, Studio, published an article highlighting his work for Meinl. His designs were also celebrated in the leading German design publication Gebrauchsgraphik. Natural images portrayed through geometric forms and flat colors were defining characteristics of the work he created during his Viennese period.

In the early 1930s, Binder increasingly set his sights on the United States after he was invited to lecture at the Chicago Art Institute and the Minneapolis School of Art. An English-language discourse on his design theories, Colour in Advertising, was published in 1934. In 1936, Binder wrote an article for the American Magazine of Art in which he promoted "stylization," his word for a modern approach based on abstraction and reduction of form. He believed that the realistic approach dominating U.S. advertising at the time needed to be replaced with "modern design." Throughout the 1930s Binder's international reputation continued to grow, fueled by the presence of his posters in exhibitions from New York to Tokyo. In 1938 he officially closed his Vienna studio two years after moving to the United States.

=== New York ===
The turbulence in Europe caused many European artists and designers to head to America. Binder was among those who emigrated to the United States. In 1936, he established a studio and residence on Central Park South in New York City. Breaking into the New York advertising world was challenging at first. Agencies asked him "to supply ideas" as a way to offer their clients an alternative approach to the realism prevalent in American advertising. This was a major change from the way Binder operated his Viennese studio where he met directly with clients and designed their entire brand including trademark, packaging and advertising.

In New York, Binder modified his illustration style to suit the American market. The hard edges of his cubist sensibilities softened to accommodate increasing detail, resulting in a modernist approach to pictorial realism, aided in part by the use of an airbrush. One of his studio assistants was a young Alex Steinweiss, who began working for him in 1937. Steinweiss later became art director at Columbia Records, where he invented the modern album cover and employed airbrush techniques he had mastered in Binder's studio.

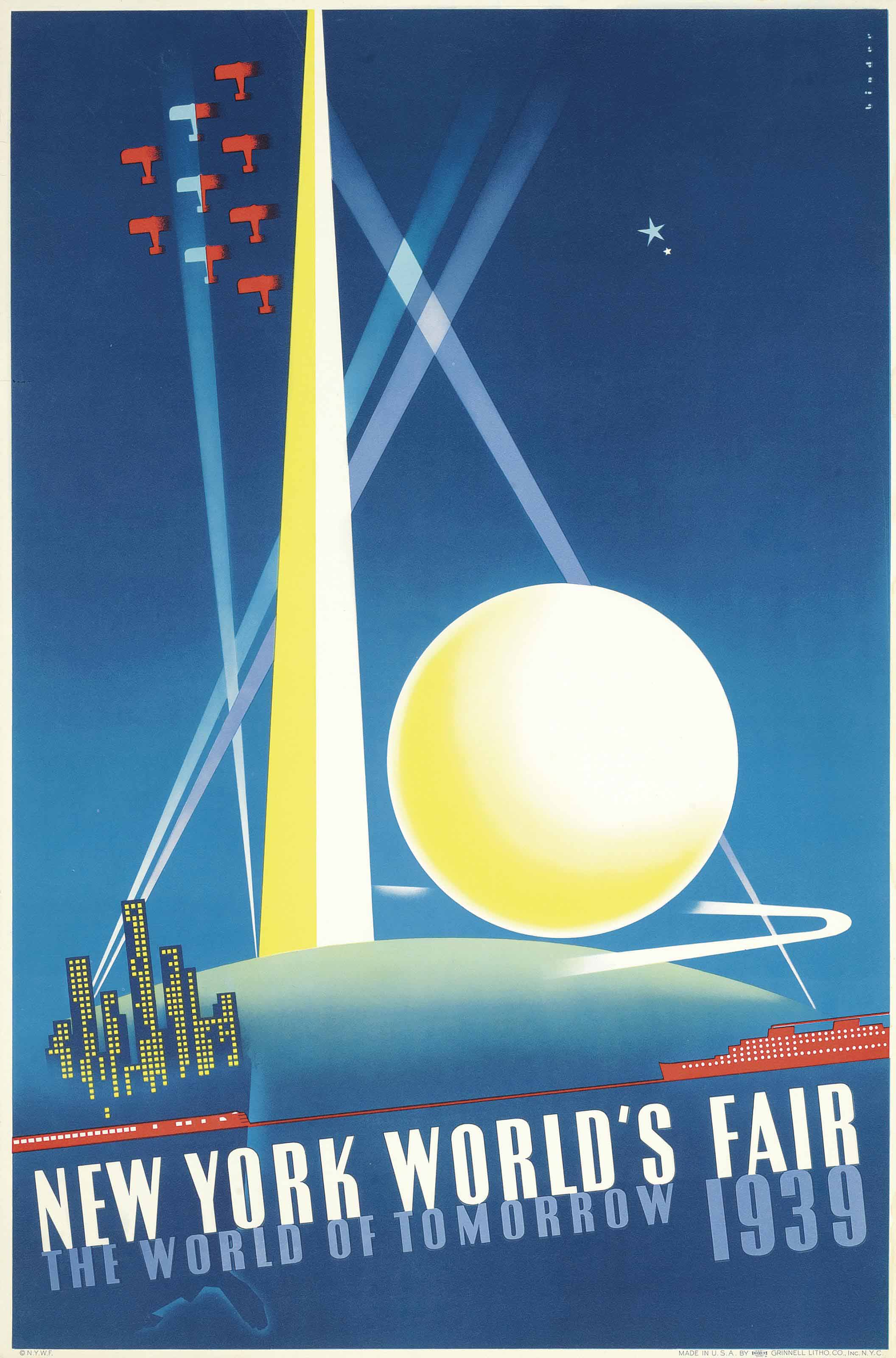
Joseph Binder's poster for the 1939 New York World's Fair

By the late 1930s, Binder found success in the United States. His winning entry for the 1939 New York World's Fair poster competition only served to further his reputation. As the New York Journal reported, "like a sponge, Binder absorbed the spirit of 20th century America so completely, in fact that he has produced the official poster for the World's Fair." His highly stylized design prominently featured a glowing trylon and perishphere, the symbol of the fair. Secondary elements, including a fleet of aircraft, an express train, an ocean liner and the New York skyline, represented America's coming of age and technological prowess. The poster's dramatic effect was heightened by Binder's decision to depict these elements at night. According to James Craig and Bruce Barton, the fair and Binder's poster marked the end of the Art Deco period.

In 1941, the Museum of Modern Art (MoMA) sponsored the National Defense Poster Competition. Binder submitted winning entries in two categories. His poster for Defense Bonds took second place and his poster for the Army Air Corps Recruiting won first place. The Army Air Corps poster is among Binder's best-known works. The simplicity of his minimalist design is striking, punctuated by flat, bold colors and changes in scale. An airplane's bright yellow wing dominates the poster as it cuts across a blue field. The Air Force's star emblem is emblazoned on the wing. Nine tiny planes fly in formation below. Type is rendered in black at the bottom of the image. In 1948, four years after he became a U.S. citizen, Binder was appointed as the Navy's principal art director; it was a position he would hold for the remainder of his career. Notable assignments for the agency included a series of posters for the Navy Chaplains Division created in the 1950s. The religious orientation of this commission resulted in a series of brilliantly colored modernist interpretations of biblical scenes.

Binder created cover designs for several American and European magazines including House & Garden (March 1936), Fortune (multiple issues from 1937 to 1940), Women's Home Companion (January 1938), Gebrauchsgraphik (multiple issues from 1930 to 1938), and Graphis (1948–1950). During World War 2, Fortune magazine invited Binder to contribute to a series of posters the magazine published in support of the war effort.

Throughout the 1940s and 1950s Binder continued to receive awards in poster competitions for Travel in America, the American Red Cross, and the United Nations. His commercial work also garnered recognition. Posters for Ballantine Beer and Sucrets Throat Lozenges were among designs that won awards from the Art Director's Club New York. He created memorable advertisements and posters for A&P Coffee and Jantzen Swimsuits. Binder's last commercial client was United Airlines. In 1957 he designed a set of eight travel posters for them. The posters depicted destinations served by the airline including Chicago, Colorado, San Francisco and Washington, D.C. The design for the Washington, D.C. poster is striking in its dramatic perspective of the Lincoln Memorial.

== Design theories and writing ==
=== Colour in Advertising ===
In the early 1930s, between lecture tours in the United States, Binder recorded his theories in Colour in Advertising. The book was published in English by the Studio Publications in 1934. It is composed of two parts: an essay on color by Binder and examples of key color concepts illustrated with tipped-in color plates of contemporary poster art.

The book begins with the statement "Colour is the poster-painter's chief means of creating effect." This statement holds true in Binder's own work, as well as his assertion that that color harmony must be a harmony of contrasts if a poster is to hold the viewer's attention. Binder advises designers to consider color's physical and psychological factors. Citing Newton and Goethe, he suggests that the optical illusion of an afterimage shows that the eye is capable of producing color on its own and this connects to "our innermost human disposition. We need green to free ourselves from red. We need yellow to counterbalance blue." Regarding the psychological effects of color, Binder forwards the idea that changing the natural colors of objects, if done carefully, can create an element of surprise.

Binder offers his work for Arabia coffee as a case study in the practical application of color. Taking a comprehensive approach to what is now called brand design, he advocates for a consistent use of color across letterhead, brochures, posters, packaging, employee uniforms and retail architecture. "If other colors are used," he cautions, "then they must never play the most important part."

The second section of the book contains examples of posters by his contemporaries, including E. McKnight Kauffer, Charles Loupot, Kató Lukáts and Hanns Wagula. The posters illustrate concepts including the use of color to create mood, historical atmosphere, a sense of style or the illusion of depth.

=== Other writings ===
Binder articulated his thoughts on modern design in "On Developing the Present-Day Style," a 1936 article he wrote for the American Magazine of Art. In it Binder set forth his argument for a new approach based on his conviction that design should reflect the spirit of the twentieth century with art that is "constructive, functional, and dynamic." He viewed realism as the domain of photography and urged designers to "abandon realistic representation and take up stylizing." Stylizing, as defined by Binder, consisted of abstracting forms from nature, simplification of objects and striking applications of color. The article was illustrated with examples of work from students he had tutored while in Chicago, Los Angeles and Minneapolis.

== Later years ==
Binder retired in 1963 and turned his focus to painting. He had studied painting at the Vienna School of Arts and Crafts and always considered himself a painter first and foremost. The nonobjective paintings he created were distinguished by their vibrant color fields. His work was displayed in exhibitions at galleries and museums, including the MoMA in New York and the Museum of Applied Art (MAK) in Vienna. On June 26, 1972, Binder died of a heart attack while installing an exhibition of his paintings in Vienna.

== Legacy ==
Alongside other European designers such as Lucien Bernhard, Binder introduced the concepts of European modernism to post-war American designers including Paul Rand and Lester Beall. As a founding member of Design Austria, the country's national design association, his legacy continues through the biennial Joseph Binder Award. The Joseph Binder Award is an international competition for graphic design and illustration. The award is funded by interest from Binder's estate.

== Awards and honors ==
Binder won numerous poster design competitions and had his work published in major design publications. His posters and paintings are held in museum collections including the Museum of Modern Art (MoMA), the Smithsonian and the Museum of Applied Art (MAK). Some of his honors include:

- Honorary Professorship awarded by the Austrian Federal Ministry of Education and Art, 1952
- Honorary member BOEG (Society of graphic designers), 1952
- Admitted to Alliance Graphique Internationale (AGI), 1954
- City of Vienna's Honorary Medal in Gold, 1969
- American Institute of Graphic Arts (AIGA) Medalist, 2004
