= Thomas B. Allen (painter) =

American painter and illustrator

Thomas Burt Allen (1928 – November 8, 2004) was an American painter and illustrator known for a moody and expressionist style that pushed the boundaries of commercial art in the 1950s and 60s. He was born in Nashville, Tennessee, where he was educated at Vanderbilt University, and later at the Art Institute of Chicago. He has created hundreds of covers and illustrations for The New Yorker, Esquire, and Sports Illustrated.

Allen was often associated with fellow illustration mavericks, Robert Weaver and Robert Andrew Parker, who challenged the saccharine atmosphere of the post-war magazine scene. This group favored a somewhat radical journalistic approach to their role and firmly opposed an illustrator's role as mere page decorator. They developed personal styles and techniques that made their chosen subjects even more resonant. They favored observing the world, drawing from life, and creating visual essays. This approach would later be termed "visual journalism" and in 1983 would form the basis of a special master's degree, Illustration as Visual Essay, from the School of Visual Arts in New York City.

Allen was known for his album covers of country and jazz musicians. He formed lasting relationships with bluegrass music banjo artist Earl Scruggs of the duo Flatt and Scruggs. Allen created 17 album covers for the band and wrote the liner notes for their Live at Vanderbilt album. Another satisfied patron, S. Neil Fujita, an art director at CBS Records, gave Allen many assignments for their jazz catalog. Being present at actual recording sessions with Jimmy Rushing allowed Allen to hone his observation skills and create work that was "more authentic."

Later in his career, he began illustrating children's books. Titles include In Coal Country by Judith Hendershot and Grandma's General Store: The Ark by Dorothy Carter. He also spent much of his time in front of students eager to learn his trade. At the University of Kansas, Hallmark Cards funded a teaching position that landed Mr. Allen at that campus. He later moved to Florida to head up the illustration department at the Ringling College of Art and Design. He remained in that position until his death.
