= Gene Federico =

American designer (1918–1999)

Gene Federico (February 6, 1918 – September 8, 1999) was an American graphic designer and advertising executive.

== Early life ==
Gene Federico was born in New York’s Greenwich Village on February 6, 1918. His family moved to the Bronx and then to Coney Island, where he attended Abraham Lincoln High School, home of Leon Friend’s Art Squad. The Art Squad exposed him to leading European Advertising artists whose inspiration would become the basis for his later work.

He attended the Pratt Institute and took weeknight classes at the Art Students League in Manhattan. He graduated from Pratt in 1939. After taking his first job in Newark, New Jersey in 1941, he became a GI stationed in North Africa and Europe until November 1945.

== Career ==
Returning from the war, Federico's work was exhibited at A-D Gallery in 1946 where he met Will Burtin, the art director for Fortune magazine. Burtin offered Federico a position as his art associate, however Federico didn’t care for editorial design and lasted only 10 months. His wife, Helen Federico worked for Paul Rand at the William Weintraub Agency, and Rand suggested he take a job at Grey Advertising. There, he met Bill Bernbach, Ned Doyle, Bob Gage, and Mac Dane. The men left to start their own agency, Doyle Dane Bernbach.

Federico was best known for his work at the agency for his Woman’s Day ads. One of his most memorable ads for Women’s Day in 1953, featured a simple and elegant use of the words “go out” to create a bicycle. This advertisement was representative of how his work integrated text and image in a composition. His heavy reliance on typography led him to work intimately with copywriters. In the mid-1950s, he developed a relationship with Aaron Burns (at the Composing Room) who introduced him to new typefaces to experiment with in his work. His work in the late 1950s and 60s was distinctly modern and the mark of American advertising’s “Creative Revolution.”

After a seven-year stint at Benton and Bowles, he started his own agency in 1967 with copywriter Dick Lord. Together, they founded Lord Federico (later renamed Lord, Geller, Federico, Einstein Inc.). He left the agency in 1991, to become an advertising and design consultant.

Federico was inducted into the Art Directors Club Hall of Fame in 1980. He was awarded the AIGA Medal in 1987. In 1991, he was awarded the Type Directors Club medal.

Federico died on September 8, 1999, in Pound Ridge, New York from prostate cancer. He was married to Helen Federico (1921-2012) and had two daughters, Gina and Lisa.
