= Roy Kuhlman =

American graphic designer

- Born: July 9, 1923; Fort Worth, Texas, U.S.
- Died: February 2007 (aged 83–84); Mesa, Arizona, U.S.
- Occupation: Graphic designer
- Known for: Book cover art

Roy Kuhlman (July 9, 1923–February 2007) was an American graphic designer. As cover designer for the avant-garde publisher Grove Press in 1950s–1960s, Kuhlman created hundreds of book covers that popularized the use of Abstract expressionism in commercial art. Kuhlman's work is considered to have had a significant influence on the look of the modern trade paperbacks and dust jackets.

== Early life and education ==
Roy Kuhlman was born on July 9, 1923, in Fort Worth, Texas, and raised in Glendale, California. He received a scholarship to the Chouinard Art Institute in Los Angeles and in 1946 obtained another scholarship to the Art Students League of New York, and also attended the Skowhegan School of Painting and Sculpture in Maine.

== Grove Press ==
In 1951, at age 28, he showed his portfolio to Barney Rosset, publisher of the avant-garde Grove Press, after trying to make it as an abstract artist. Rosset was not impressed. However, as Kuhlman was putting away his book, two pieces of abstract art that he had not intended to show fell from one of the side pockets.

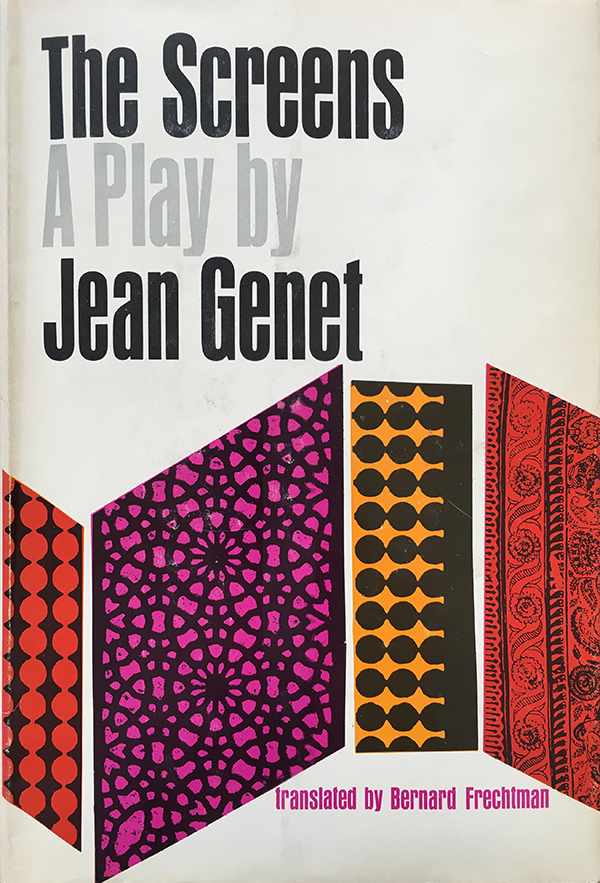
Kuhlman's cover design for the first American edition of The Screens by Jean Genet, published by Grove Press (1962)

Kuhlman was hired to design Grove's book covers and did so until the late 1960s. In Kuhlman's covers for Grove, he gradually began to apply abstract art in a more graphic way, not only to imagery, but also to type. Rosset described Kuhlman's designs as an attempt to "go between being a purely creative act and a commercial one." His work was occasionally representational, but often conceptual, with a distinctive style that was more edgy than most of other mid-century modern designs of the time, and appealed to the counterculture of the 1950s and 60s. Rosset saw in Kuhlman's designs the perfect counterpoint to the avant-garde texts he was publishing. While at Grove, Kuhlman created over 700 covers, at a rate of over 50 per year, cementing him as a pioneering designer of modern book jackets. Kuhlman also designed the original format, now known as "trade paperback", that allowed for affordable printing of new literature, for Evergreen Review, Grove's cultural magazine.

== Career in advertising ==
Additionally, Kuhlman worked in the advertising business alongside art director Herb Lubalin at the Sudler & Hennessy agency, and in 1954 he briefly became an art director and designer for Columbia Records, taking over from Neil Fujita. Public relations firm Ruder & Finn then hired him to create an in-house art department. He left Ruder & Finn for Benton & Bowles where he designed the award-winning Mathematics Serving Man campaign for IBM, which appeared in Time, Newsweek, and U.S. News & World Report in May 1960. He joined Electra Films in 1962, creating motion graphics and title sequences. In 1967, he created animated shorts to promote IBM's computer sales at the recommendation of Henry Wolf.

== Legacy and death ==
After retiring as a designer in the 1980s, he continued to make his own photographic experiments. In 1995 he was inducted into the Art Directors Club Hall of Fame. Kuhlman died in February 2007 aged 83 in Mesa, Arizona.
