= George Tscherny =

Hungarian-born American graphic designer (1924–2023)

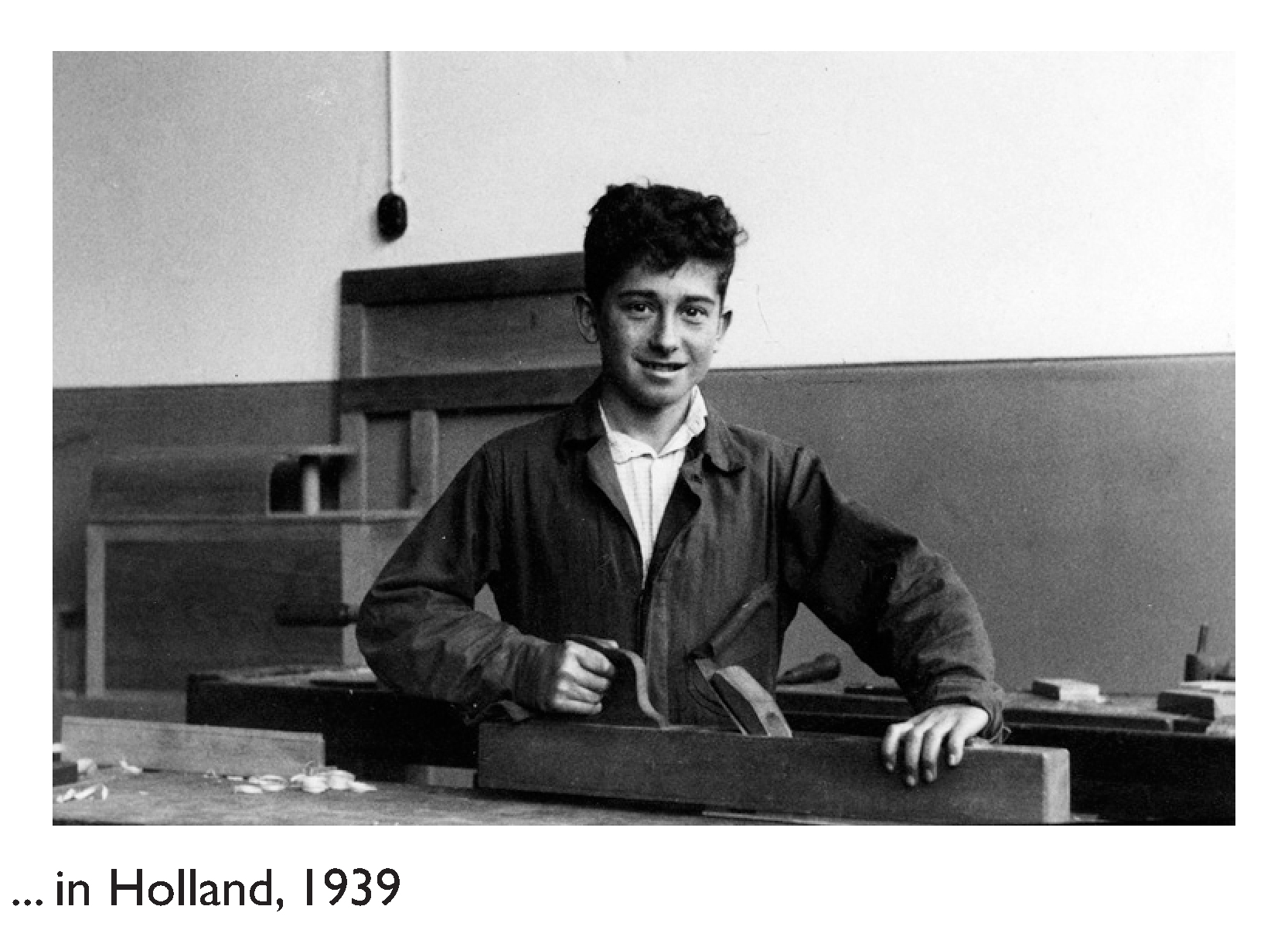
- Born: July 12, 1924; Budapest, Hungary
- Died: November 13, 2023 (aged 99); Manhattan, New York, U.S.
- Education: Newark School of Fine and Industrial Art
- Alma mater: Pratt Institute
- Known for: graphic designer, educator
- Spouse: Sonia Katz
- Children: 2

George Tscherny (July 12, 1924 – November 13, 2023) was a Hungarian-born American graphic designer and educator. Tscherny received the highest honors among graphic designers. He was awarded the AIGA Medal in 1988, celebrated in the annual Masters Series in 1992 at the School of Visual Arts, and inducted into the Art Directors Club Hall of Fame in 1997. He worked in a number of areas ranging from U.S. postage to identity programs for large corporations and institutions.

Working at the height of mid-20th century American modernist design, Tscherny displayed "an ability to seize the essence of the subject and express it in stunningly simple terms" and to reduce "complex content to an elemental graphic symbol expressing the underlying order or basic form of the subject."

At the same time, Tscherny straddled the line between the high European design of the early 20th century and the more popular forms of design communication in the burgeoning post-War American consumer culture. Reflecting on his career in Print magazine in 2014, Tscherny writes, “Unlike the fine artist who values only the original, I as a commercial artist, honor the reproduction as well as its source. I find myself comfortable at the intersection of high and low art”.

== Early life and education ==
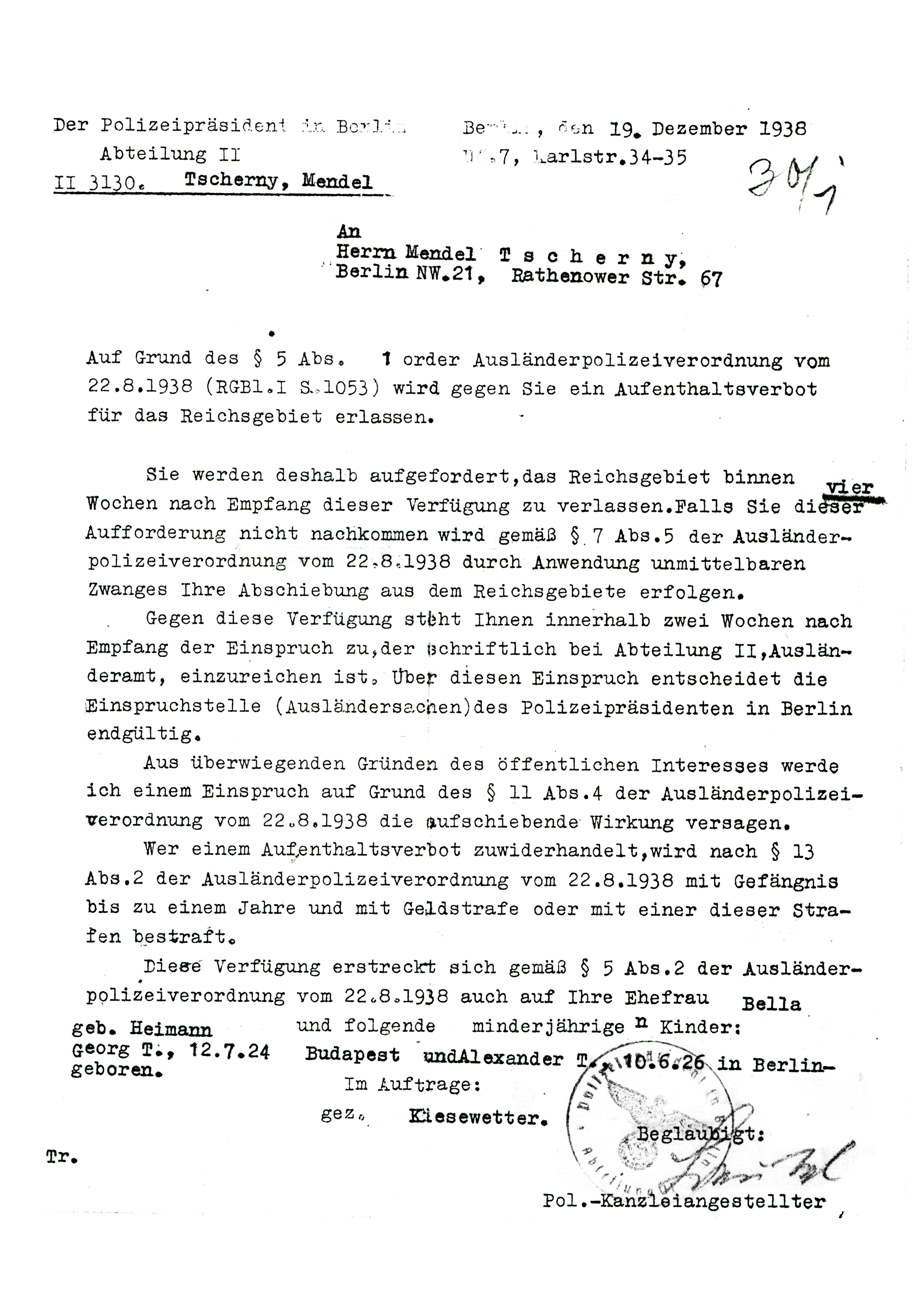
Deportation order addressed to Tscherny's falther, Mendel (1938)

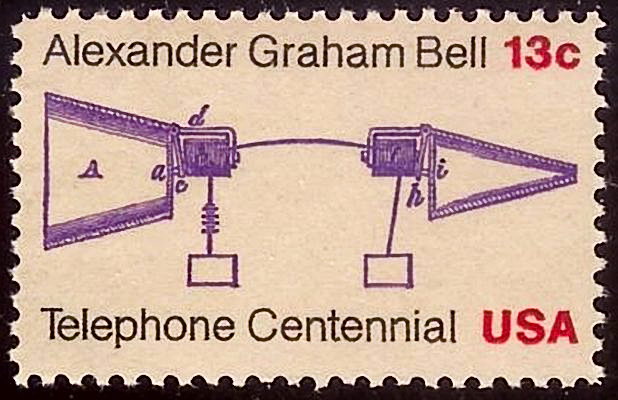
U.S. postage stamp commemorating Alexander Graham Bell's telephone, designed by Tscherny.

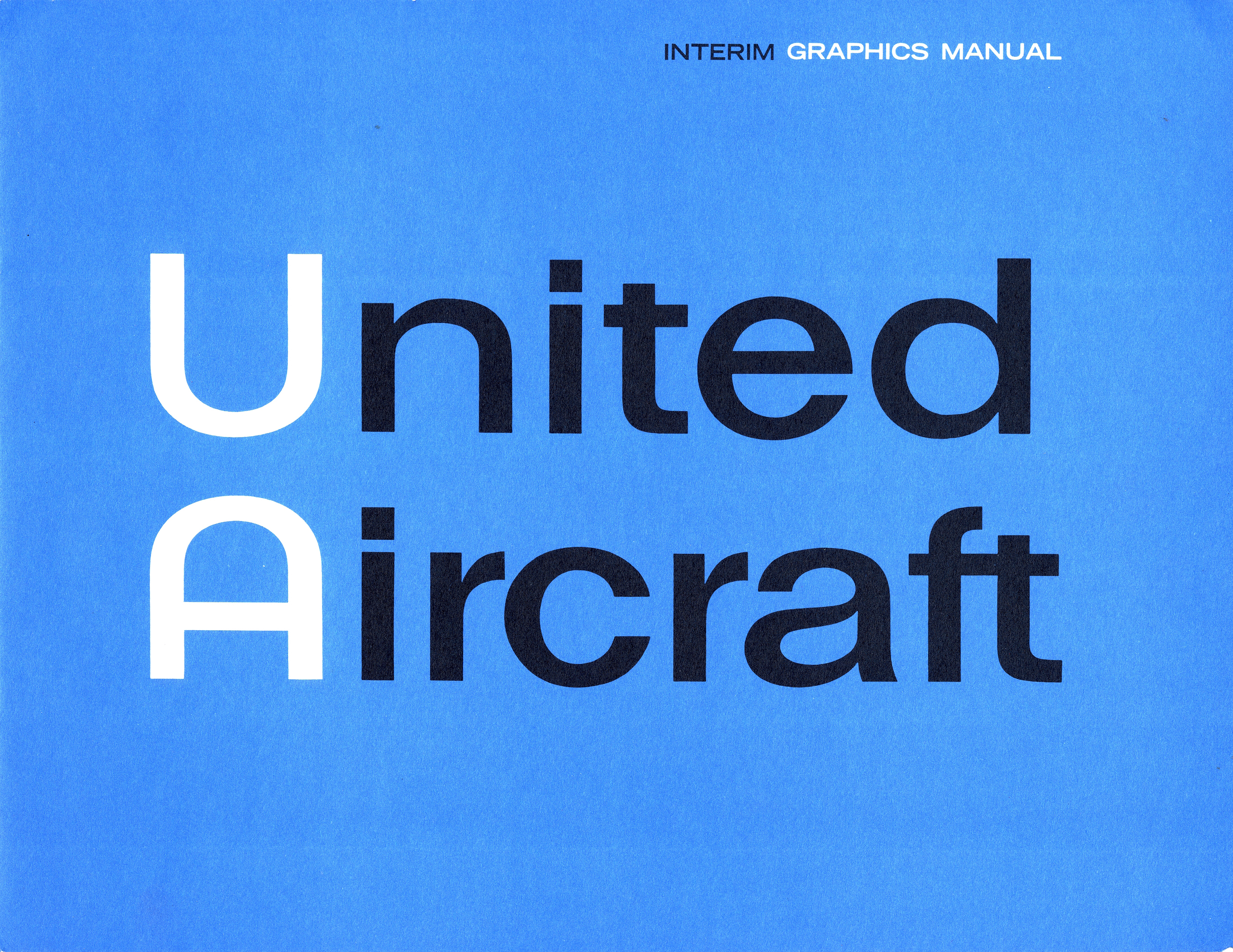
Graphics standards manual for United Aircraft, designed by Tscherny.

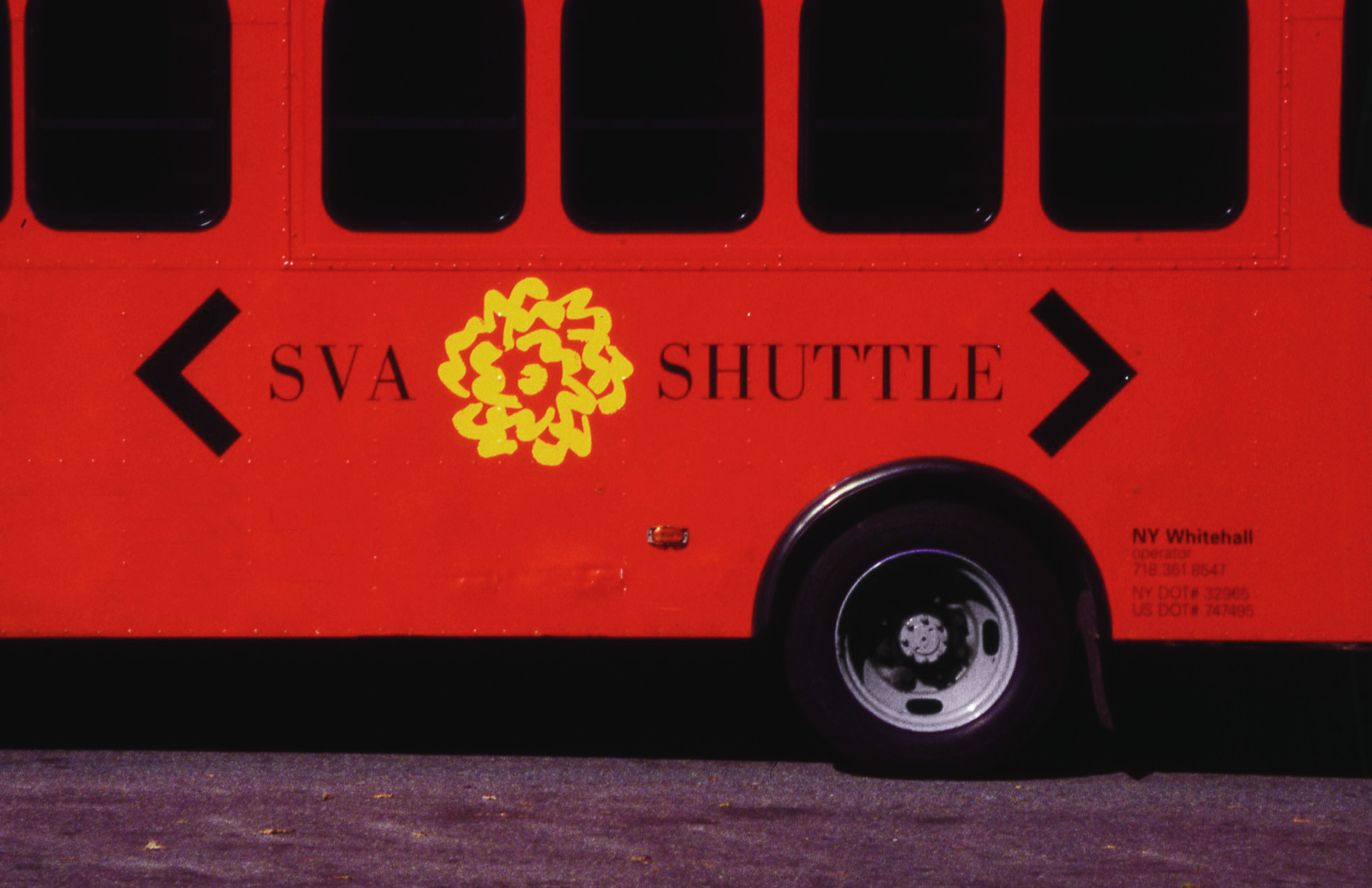
Shuttle bus for the School of Visual Arts featuring Tscherny's logo design.

George Tscherny was born July 12, 1924, in Budapest, to parents Mendel Tscherny and Bella Heimann. His family was Jewish. In 1926, they moved to Berlin, Germany, where they lived until he was 14. In December 1938, one month after Kristallnacht, Tscherny and his 12-year-old brother escaped illegally into Holland, where they were granted asylum. Tscherny studied cabinet-making in Holland’s vocational school system while living in various homes for refugee children. Meanwhile, his parents in Berlin having received deportation orders managed to emigrate via Norway to the United States, where they worked to secure United States visas and passage for their sons. Tscherny and his brother, having to return to Berlin in 1941 to secure entrance visas to Portugal, were confronted by the Gestapo for violating the deportation order not having realized that the order had applied to them as well. They were given two weeks to leave Germany, fortunately extended several times.

In June 1941, George and his brother boarded a sealed train which took them from Berlin via France and Spain to Lisbon. On June 10, 1941 they boarded the steamship Mouzinho, which reached New York on June 21, the day before Germany invaded Russia. Tscherny settled in Newark, New Jersey where he found a factory job. In June 1944, exactly three years after having left, Tscherny landed back in Europe as a soldier in the United States Army, working as a German interpreter in a small prisoner of war compound in Normandy and later with military government in Germany.

Discharged in 1946, Tscherny attended art school on the G.I. Bill, first at the Newark School of Fine and Industrial Art, transferring in the fall of 1947 to Pratt Institute in Brooklyn, New York, where he studied under Herschel Levit and James Brooks.

In 1947, he met Sonia Katz, and the two were married in 1950. For the next seven decades Sonia had a profound influence on Tscherny's private as well professional life. They occupied a New York City townhouse which also incorporated Tscherny’s design studio. They had two daughters.

Tscherny cited as some of his earliest influences the photographer Henri Cartier-Bresson, the American graphic designer Lester Beall, and the type designer Imre Reiner, and later the Bernard Rudofsky and Ernst Gombrich, the jazz composer John Lewis, and the architect and designer George Nelson.

== Career ==
In 1950, Tscherny began his professional career as a packaging designer with Donald Deskey Associates. In 1953, Tscherny joined George Nelson & Associates, a firm in the vanguard of post-war Modernist design. Tscherny became an associate and head of the graphics department before leaving the Nelson office to open an independent design office in 1956. Tscherny began to teach in the same year. Around the same time, he was hired by the Cartoonist and Illustrators School (soon to become the School of Visual Arts) to establish a graphic design department and change the direction of the curriculum. He also designed a series of posters to appear in the subway that would reflect the new image and expanded goals of the school and later designed the school's current logo.

The Tscherny design office quickly acquired a distinguished roster of institutional and corporate clients. Tscherny was appointed design consultant to the Ford Foundation. In 1955, he designed the first appointment calendar for the Museum of Modern Art. The Tscherny office designed comprehensive identification programs for United Aircraft, Texasgulf, and W.R. Grace, as well as corporate annual reports for RCA, American Can, Burlington Industries, Colgate Palmolive, General Dynamics, Johnson & Johnson, CPC International, Morgan Stanley, SEI Investments, Uris Buildings, Colonial Penn Group, Mickelberry Corp., and Overseas National Airways.

A wide range of other assignments included the design of a US postage stamp commemorating Alexander Graham Bell and the centennial of the telephone, cigarette packaging for Liggett & Myers Tobacco Co., and illustrations for the Saturday Evening Post. Past clients include: Champion Papers, Monadnock Paper, Strathmore, Simpson Paper, Air Canada, PanAm, Mobil, IBM, Bankers Trust, Goethe House, J.C. Penney, Bergamo Fabrics, American Federation of Arts, Interactive Language Teaching, Owens-Corning Fiberglas, Millipore, and numerous others.

Tscherny’s posters are represented in the collection of the Museum of Modern Art, N.Y.; the Cooper Hewitt Smithsonian Design Museum, N.Y.; the Library of Congress, Washington, DC; and the Kunstgewerbemuseum, Zürich. A comprehensive collection of Tscherny’s work is included in the Graphic Design Archives at Rochester Institute of Technology and in the Milton Glaser Design Study Center and Archives at the School of Visual Arts. Over 100 posters and other examples of work are included in the AGI archives of the Bibliothèque Nationale de France.

Tscherny served two terms (1966–1968) as president of the American Institute of Graphic Arts (AIGA) and was a member of Alliance Graphique Internationale (AGI). In 1988, the American Institute of Graphic Arts (AIGA) awarded George Tscherny their annual medal “In recognition of distinguished achievements and contributions to the graphic arts.” In 1997 Tscherny was inducted into the N.Y. Art Directors Hall of Fame.

The book “AIGA Self Portraits 2015” featured self-portraits by established designers with their advice to young designers. Tscherny contributed a self-portrait with the comment: “Respect for the past, enthusiasm for the present, and Hope for the future.”

== Death ==
Tscherny died at his home in Manhattan on November 13, 2023, at the age of 99.
