= Leon Friend =

American graphic design educator

Leon Friend (February 22, 1902 – June 11, 1969) was a graphic design educator.

== Biography ==
Leon Friend was born in Warsaw, Poland on February 22, 1902, and later immigrated to Schenectady, New York in 1905. He married Ann Bickel and together had a son and two daughters.

In 1930, he became Abraham Lincoln High School's in Brooklyn, New York art department chair as a way to escape the Great Depression. In this position he taught students graphic designers until his death in 1969. His program was available to low-income students and featured mentoring and career development, departing from the Board of Education curriculum. His course merged design history with solving professional problems and invited guest lecturers including Laszlo Moholy Nagy, Lucian Bernhard, Lynd Ward, Chaim Gross and Moses Soyer to introduce students to well-known figures in graphic design. His studio was one of the first in the United States to introduce progressive European design ideas and emphasized learning at the students at their own pace. Former students include Sheila de Brettville, Seymour Chwast, Jay Maisel, Irving Penn, and Alex Steinwiess.

Friend founded the extracurricular club "Art Squad," to further help students succeed in the real world. Membership hinged on the invitation and sponsorship of another student and a portfolio review. The elite Art Squad created work for the school and neighborhood.

In 1936, he wrote the book Graphic design with Joeseph Hefter which was the first book that comprehensively covered graphic design, describing the profession as the "creative endeavor which finds expression through the medium of printing ink."

== Death and legacy ==
Friend died in his home in Long Island on June 1, 1969. Upon his death, the Architectural League of New York organized an exhibit called "Mr Friend: The Impact of One Art Teacher" of more than 150 of his former students' work.

In 1972, the Brooklyn Museum founded a scholarship in his name with sponsorship by The Art Squad, Inc. for advertising and printmaking. In 1987, Friend was inducted into the Art Directors Club Hall of Fame.

== Books ==
- Graphic design. Leon Friend and Joseph Hefter, 1936.
