= Philip Hays =

Philip Harrison "Phil" Hays (1931–2005) was an American illustrator.

Born in Sherman, Texas on March 14, 1931, Hays grew up in Louisiana, served in the Air Force and in 1952 enrolled at the Art Center College of Design in Pasadena. After graduating in 1955, Hays moved to New York. Almost overnight he became a top illustrator creating romantic illustrations for magazines like Seventeen, Cosmopolitan, Redbook and McCalls. In 1957 Silas Rhodes invited him to teach at the young School of Visual Arts, and Hays did, soon becoming head of the illustration program. While staying in New York, his circle of friends included movie actors Ben Piazza and Rita Gam, artist Andy Warhol and restaurateur Johnny Nicholson.

In 1978 Hays accepted an invitation from Art Center College of Design to head their illustration program and moved back to California.

His former student Doug Aitken wrote, "Hays' work slid under the door of popular culture and affected it like sand falling in the cracks of a machine…the glamour of the subjects fade and their flaws and vulnerability appear…revealed is our beautiful disintegration as we're faced with the inevitable race toward mortality."

Hays died on October 24, 2005. Five years later, he was awarded with New York ADC Hall of Fame.
