= Alex Steinweiss =

American graphic designer

Alexander "Alex" Steinweiss
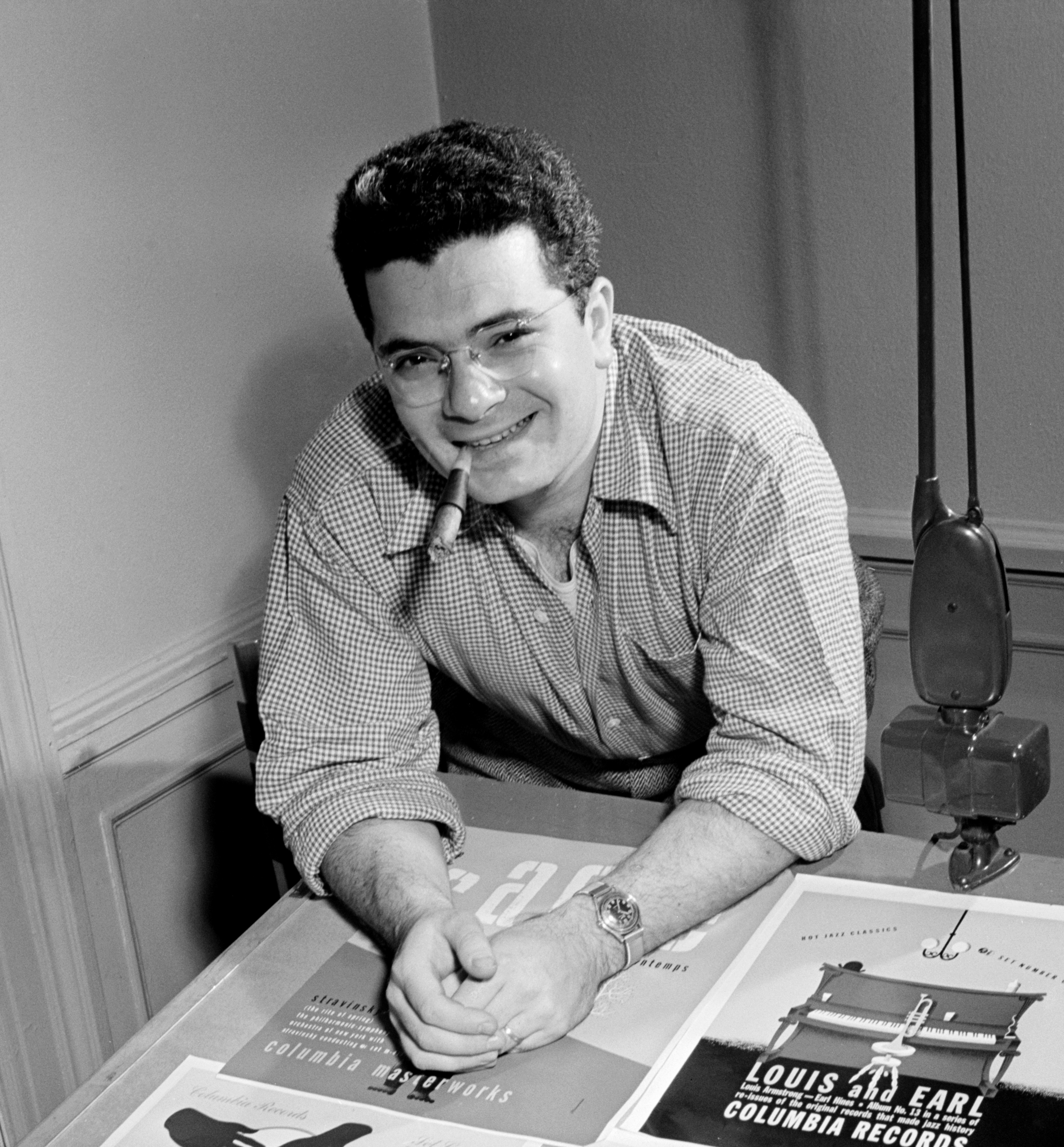
- Steinweiss in 1947
- Born: March 24, 1917; Brooklyn, New York, US
- Died: July 17, 2011 (aged 94); Sarasota, Florida, US
- Occupation: Artist
- Known for: Album cover Jacket for LP records

Alexander Steinweiss (March 24, 1917 – July 17, 2011) was an American graphic design artist known for inventing album cover art.

== Early life ==
Born on March 24, 1917, in Brooklyn, Alex Steinweiss was the son of a women's shoe designer from Warsaw and a seamstress from Riga, Latvia. His parents had first moved to the Lower East Side of Manhattan and later on, settled in the Brighton Beach area of Brooklyn.

Steinweiss said he was destined to be a commercial artist. He studied under Leon Friend at Abraham Lincoln High School, and his classmates marveled that he "could take a brush, dip it in some paint and make letters," he recalled. "So I said to myself, 'If some day I could become a good sign painter, that would be terrific!"'

Steinweiss earned a scholarship to the Parsons School of Design, and graduated in 1937.

== Career ==
After graduation Steinweiss impressed Lucian Bernhard, the renowned German poster designer, with his portfolio, Bernhard got him a job in his friend Joseph Binder's studio. Steinweiss worked for three years for the Austrian poster designer Joseph Binder, whose flat color and simplified human figures were popular at the time and influenced his own work.

In the 1930s recorded music was sold in plain packaging, or record shop advertising 'bags'; sets of discs were also usually issued in plain albums. However, colored artwork had been used on special albums, from World War I. This was separately printed and pasted onto album covers and occasionally inside the albums: for example, HMV's issue of Liza Lehmann's "In a Persian Garden" and operettas by Edward German and Gilbert & Sullivan were all available by 1918 in such decorated albums. In 1938, Alex Steinweiss was the first art director for Columbia Records, where he introduced a wider application of album covers and cover art. "They were so drab, so unattractive," said Steinweiss, "I convinced the executives to let me design a few."

During World War II, Alex Steinweiss served as Columbia Records' advertising manager before leaving to take up a role at the Navy's Training and Development Center in New York City. There, he was responsible for creating teaching materials and cautionary posters. Steinweiss continued to do freelance work for Columbia after the war. During a lunch meeting with Columbia, the president of the company, Ted Wallerstein, presented Steinweiss with a new innovation that was being prepared to be unveiled by the company: the long-playing record. Unfortunately, the Kraft paper that was folded to protect the 78 rpm records proved to be too heavy. The Kraft paper left marks on the vinyls microgroove of the 33 1/3 rpm LPs when they were stacked. Steinweiss later went on to develop what is now known as a record jacket.

The first illustrated album cover for 78 rpm records was created by Alex Steinweiss in 1938, while he also developed the paperboard container for 33 1/3 LPs in 1953, which went on to become the industry norm for packaging for more than three decades.

Alex Steinweiss was involved in creating album cover designs from 1938 until his semi-retirement in 1973, where he shifted his focus towards painting. Throughout his career, he designed around 2,500 covers, his career can be divided into five different periods:

The first period, from 1938 to around 1945, Steinweiss designed all the covers for Columbia, where he developed the complete visual "language" for album design.

In the second period, from 1945 to approximately 1950, Steinweiss was no longer the exclusive designer for Columbia, and he started to work with other companies. This period is occasionally referred to as the "First Golden Age" of the album cover. The Steinweiss Scrawl, which is now recognized as Alex Steinweiss's signature font, made its initial appearance around 1947. Steinweiss can also take credit for the Grecian column design Columbia used in 1948 on the first LP envelopes. The design was borrowed from the earlier 78 rpm album cover, MM577, the Mendelssohn violin concerto played by Nathan Milstein. This performance was chosen by Columbia to be the first 12-inch LP, ML4001.

In approximately 1950, Steinweiss designed the covers and record labels for Remington and established a relationship spanning over 20 years with both Decca and London Records. During this period, he primarily used drawing as his preferred design technique for clients such as Columbia, RCA, Remington, Decca and London. This marked his third design period, in which he employed drawing, lettering, and layout to create brilliant designs, though perhaps not as memorable as his late 1940s work. It was during this period that he collaborated with Margaret Bourke-White on a memorable series of covers for Columbia.

From the mid-1950s onwards, Steinweiss incorporated photography into his work. Steinweiss's photographic covers are considered remarkably distinctive. He utilized strange garish colors, odd lighting, and numerous visual puns and reference points. He continued to work for Decca and London, and did the entire series of covers (and the logo and label) for the startup Everest label from 1958 until about 1960. This was his fourth period, characterized by photography but continuing to use the entire range of tools he had developed.

Steinweiss' final period of record cover design was from 1960 to roughly 1973, again working for Decca and London. His new developments of the period were in die-cut designs and collage.

Steinweiss's cover for the original Broadway cast recording of South Pacific (1949) has been in almost continuous use ever since for the 78 rpm set, the LP, the 45 rpm set, various tape formats and the CD. The only other graphic design in America to be used for so many years is the Coca-Cola bottle.

In 1942, as the art director for the label, Steinweiss recruited Jim Flora, a talented fine arts graduate from Cincinnati. This recruitment launched Flora's 40+ year career as a commercial artist.

In 2001, Steinweiss was featured in Carlo McCormick's gallery show "The LP Show," originating in New York's Exit Art and then in 2002 traveling to the Experience Music Project in Seattle and The Andy Warhol Museum in Pittsburgh.

He was interviewed for a chapter in Sound Unbound: Sampling Digital Music and Culture (The MIT Press, 2008) edited by Paul D. Miller a.k.a. DJ Spooky.

== Death ==
Alex Steinweiss died on July 18, 2011, in Sarasota, Florida, as confirmed by his son Leslie. He is survived by his daughter Hazel Steinweiss, six grandchildren, and three great-grandchildren, in addition to his son.

== Awards ==
In 1998, Steinweiss was inducted into the Art Directors Club Hall of Fame.

In 2003, CMP Information and the International Recording Media Association created the Alex Awards for Excellence in album cover art, which were named in honor of Alex Steinweiss.

== Sources and further reading ==
- Alex Steinweiss, Jennifer McKnight-Trontz. For the Record: The Life and Work of Alex Steinweiss ISBN 1-56898-224-0, Princeton Architectural Press; 2000.
- Eric Kohler, In the Groove: Vintage Record Graphics, 1940-1960 (ISBN 0-8118-2121-8) Chronicle Books, San Francisco, 1999.
- Heller, Steven; Pomeroy, Karen, Design Literacy: Understanding Graphic Design (ISBN 1-880559-76-5) Watson-Guptill Pubns, NY, 1997. One chapter on Steinweiss.
- Chusid, Irwin. The Mischievous Art of Jim Flora (Fantagraphics Books, 2004); features an interview with Steinweiss
- Heller, Steven, and Reagan, Kevin: Alex Steinweiss, The Inventor of the Modern Album Cover, ISBN 978-3-8365-0192-7, Taschen, 2009.

== See also ==
- List of AIGA medalists
