= Cipe Pineles =

Austrian graphic designer and art director (1908–1991)

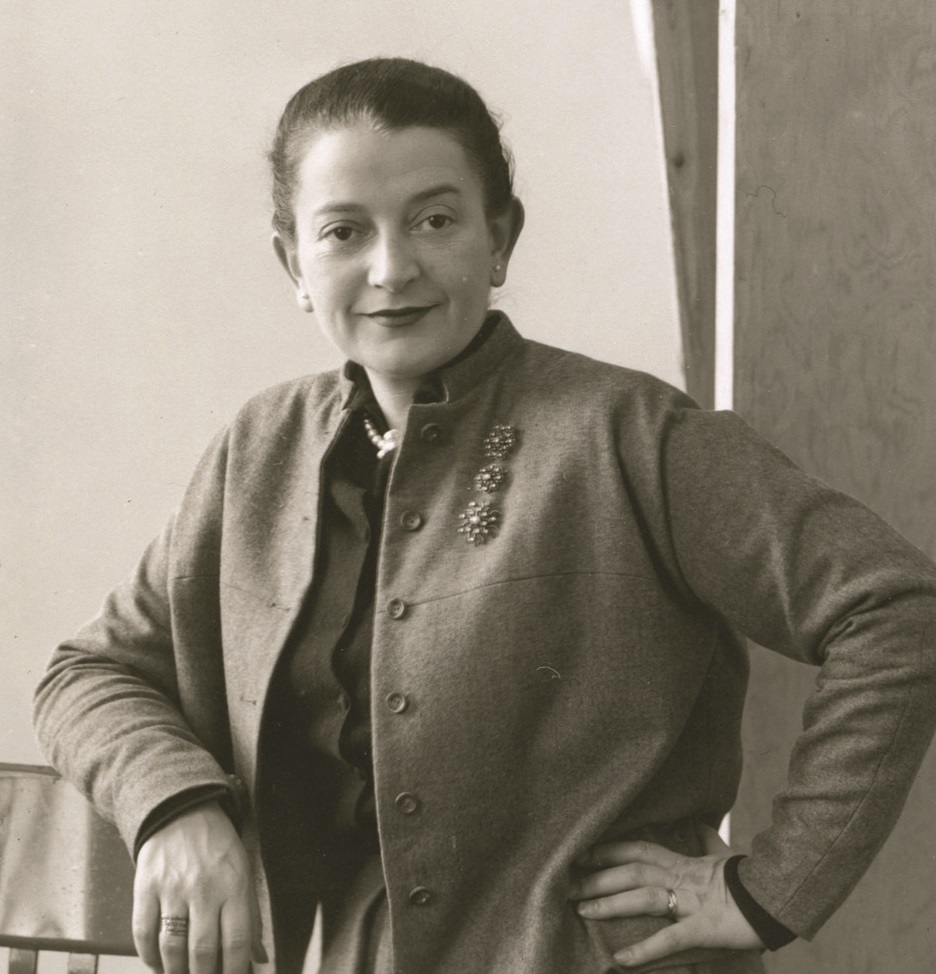
- Born: June 23, 1908; Vienna, Austria
- Died: January 3, 1991 (aged 82); Suffern, New York, US
- Education: Pratt Institute
- Occupations: Graphic designer and art director
- Years active: 1931–1991
- Known for: First female art director for major magazines, brought fine art into mass-produced media, First female member of Art Directors Club, first female member of the Alliance Graphique Internationale
- Spouses: William Golden (m. 1939; died 1959) Will Burtin (m. 1961; died 1972)
- Children: 2
- Awards: Herb Lubalin Award; AIGA Medal

Cipe Pineles (June 23, 1908 – January 3, 1991) was an Austrian-born graphic designer and art director who made her career in New York at such magazines as Seventeen, Charm, Glamour, House & Garden, Vanity Fair and Vogue. She was the first female art director of many major magazines, as well as being credited as the first person to bring fine art into mainstream mass-produced media. She married two prominent designers, twice widowed, had two adopted children, and two grandchildren.

== Biography ==
Pineles was born June 23, 1908, in Vienna, the fourth of five children, spending her early childhood in Poland, and her father was often sick. In 1915, she immigrated to the United States with her mother and sisters at the age of 7. She attended Bay Ridge High School in Brooklyn and won a Tiffany Foundation Scholarship to Pratt Institute from 1927 to 1931. She continued her education in 1930 at the Louis Comfort Tiffany Foundation.

== Career ==
In 1929, Pineles first position was teaching as an instructor in watercolor paintings at the Newark Public School of Fine and Industrial Art in New Jersey. After her graduation and post Great Depression, Pineles also began work at Green Mansions, an adult resort/summer camp in the Adirondacks. Her work at Green Mansions continued into the 1950s, where she designed the resort's annual brochure, stationery, and mailings for events and special holidays.

She started her career at the age of 23 at Contempora an industrial design firm founded by European émigrés after struggling to enter the work force due to sexism in the industry. She worked there from 1931-1933 until Condé Nast’s wife noticed Pineles’ work at Contempora. In 1932 (to 1936) she became an assistant to Dr. M. F. Agha, the art director of Condé Nast Publications. Agha, testing new ideas with photography and layout, allowed Pineles great independence, therefore she designed a considerable number of projects on her own. She soon became the art director for Glamour, a publication directed at young women. This is where her style as a playful modernist developed through various uses of image and type.

She worked for Vogue in New York and London (1932–38) and Overseas Woman in Paris (1945–46). She continued to develop her distinct style throughout her career, and in 1942, she became art director of Glamour. She went on to become the art director at Seventeen (1947-1950), then Charm (1950–59), and moved in 1961 to become art director of Mademoiselle in New York. From 1961 to 1972, she left editorial design in the 1960s and she served as the first art director for the Lincoln Center for the Performing Arts, she worked as a graphic design consultant for the Lincoln Center for the Performing Arts in New York, supervising the creation of branding and marketing materials for this institution of the arts.

At Seventeen, Pineles worked alongside Helen Valentine, founder, editor-in-chief and a writer for the magazine, and Estelle Ellis, a marketer for the magazine. She started the art/illustration program that would distinguish Seventeen from other publications. She was also credited with being the first person to bring fine art into mainstream, mass-produced media. She commissioned fine artists such as Ad Reinhardt and Andy Warhol to illustrate articles during her time at Seventeen. Pineles rejected the standard that women should be mindless and focused on finding a husband, and considered her readers thoughtful and serious.

After finishing her work at Seventeen, she began her career at Charm, a magazine subtitled "the magazine for women who work." The magazine recognized that women held two jobs: one in the workplace and one at home. Pineles described Charm as "...the first feminist magazine. There would have been no room for Ms. magazine if Charm had not been dropped." Similar to her work at Seventeen, Pineles worked her interests into elements of Charm. She planned the number of four-color pages, two-color pages, and the general pattern for the issue itself. When Charm was folded into Glamour magazine in 1959, Cipe Pineles moved on to Mademoiselle magazine.

“We tried to make the prosaic attractive without using the tired clichés of false glamour,” she said in an interview. “You might say we tried to convey the attractiveness of reality, as opposed to the glitter of a never-never land.” Her work contributed to the effort to redefine the style of women’s magazines. Her efforts also contributed to the feminist movement by helping to continue to change women's roles in society.

Pineles joined the faculty of Parsons School of Design in 1963 and was also its director of publication design. Positions as Andrew Mellon Professor at Cooper Union for the Advancement of Science and Art (in 1977) and on the visiting committee for Harvard Graduate School of Design (in 1978) followed.

Pineles was also the illustrator for Marjorie Hillis' best-selling book "Live Alone and Like It," published by The Bobbs-Merrill Company in 1936.

== Achievements and awards ==
Pineles' essay about her journey from Austria immigrating to the United States won an award from The Atlantic Monthly.

Pineles repeatedly broke the glass ceiling in the design field. She became the first female member of the Art Directors Club in 1943 after being nominated for 10 years and was the second woman inducted into Art Directors Club Hall of Fame in 1975. In 1955, she became the first and, until 1968, only female member of the Alliance Graphique Internationale.

In 1984, she was honored by the Society of Publication Designers with Herb Lubalin Award. Pineles received the AIGA Medal in 1996.

== Leave Me Alone with the Recipes ==
As a personal project, Pineles wrote and illustrated a sketchbook of Eastern European Jewish recipes, completing a manuscript in 1945. According to Pineles, most of the recipes in the book were passed down by her mother, Bertha Pineles, who appears as a gray-haired woman in several illustrations. "I think it was a way of celebrating the background of the family... bringing with them some of what they had had in Europe," said Carol Burtin Fripp, Pineles' daughter. The manuscript was bought by a collector at an estate sale and was eventually found by illustrator Wendy MacNaughton at an antiquarian book fair in San Francisco. MacNaughton and magazine editor Sarah Rich purchased the manuscript with writer Maria Popova and design writer Debbie Millman and spent three years researching Pineles, interviewing old colleagues and members of Pineles' family, searching Pineles' archives at the Rochester Institute of Technology, and recreating all of the recipes. The book was published as Leave Me Alone with the Recipes by Bloomsbury USA on October 17, 2017.

The published version (edited by MacNaughton, Rich, Popova and Millman) contains all of Pineles' hand-lettered and hand-painted recipes and includes essays of Pineles' life and career, with contributions from food critic Mimi Sheraton (who worked with Pineles at Seventeen), design writer Steven Heller, graphic designer Paula Scher (who knew Pineles), and Maira Kalman. While researching, Rich recreated all of the written recipes and, with cook Christian Reynoso, modernized some of the recipes presented in the final section of the book. The modernized recipes are meant to be more accessible to modern cooking methods and ingredients and to fill in for the experience cooks were expected to know with the original recipes. On the book, Rich said, "The aim was to tell her story, show her artwork, and emphasize the food."

== Personal life ==
Pineles married two notable designers. She and William Golden were married from 1939 until his death in 1959. She and Will Burtin were married from 1961 until his death in 1972. Pineles died in 1991. Pineles had a son, Thomas Pineles Golden, with William Golden and a daughter, Carol Burtin Fripp, with Will Burtin, along with two grandchildren. She suffered from kidney disease and ultimately died of a heart attack.

== Sources ==
- Ellis, Estelle and Burtin Fripp, Carol. Cipe Pineles : two remembrances. Cary Graphic Arts Press, Rochester 2005 (ISBN 9780975965153 OCLC 645910012)
- Richards, Melanie. Badass Lady Creative [in History]: Cipi Pineles.
- Scotford, Martha. Cipe Pineles – Artist as Art Director. Heller 2001
- Scotford, Martha. Cipe Pineles – A life of design W. W. Norton & Company, New York 1999 (ISBN 9780393730272 OCLC 38883935)
- Scofford, Martha. The tenth pioneer: Cipi Pineles was a design innovator. Why, when the history came to be written was she left out? Eye Magazine, Autumn 1995.
- Scotford, Martha. The tenth pioneer – Thoughts on Cipe Pineles. Breuer, Gerda, Meer, Julia (ed): Women in Graphic Design, p. 164, Jovis, Berlin 2012 (ISBN 9783868591538)
- Scotford, Martha. Cipe Pineles. American Institute of Graphic Arts
