= Lester Beall =

American graphic designer (1903–1969)

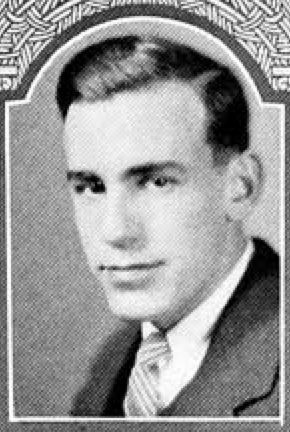
- Yearbook photo of Lester Beall, University of Chicago (c. 1926)
- Born: 14 March 1903; Kansas City
- Died: 20 June 1969 (aged 66); Harkness Pavilion
- Occupation: Graphic designer, designer

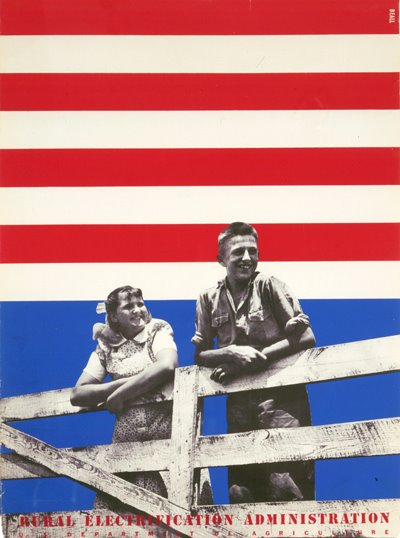
A poster by Beall for the Rural Electrification Administration (REA)

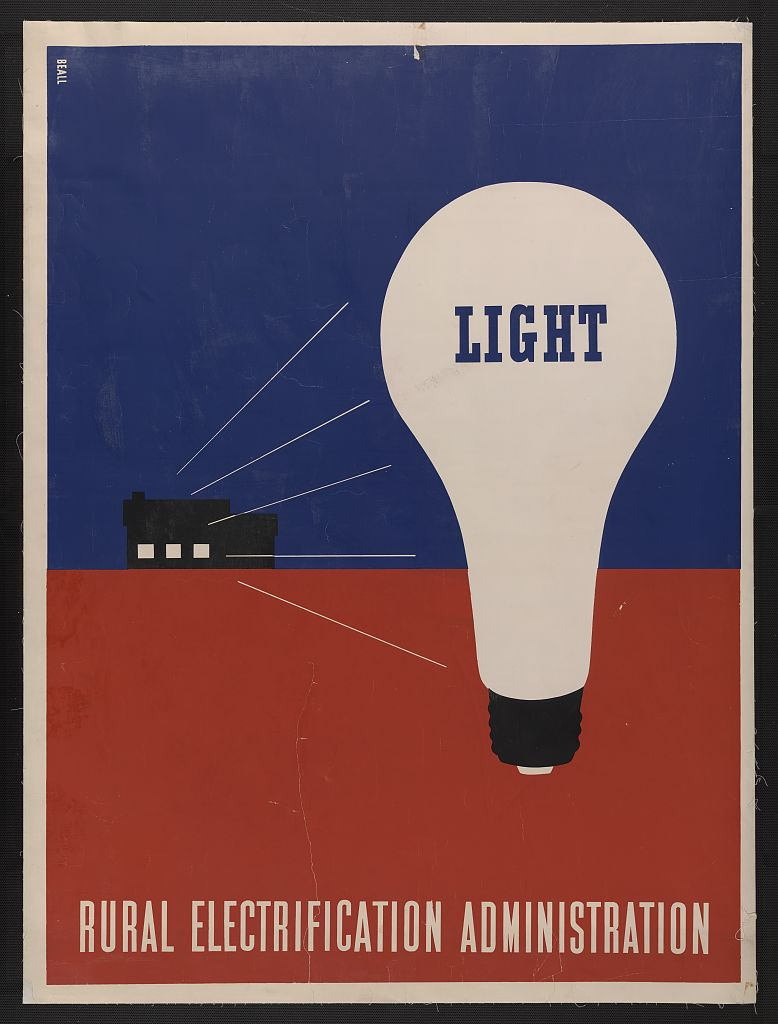
Another Beall REA poster from the 1930s

Lester Beall (14 March 1903 – 20 June 1969) was an American graphic designer who was a leading proponent of modernist graphic design in the United States.

== Biography ==
Lester Thomas Beall was born in Kansas City, Missouri. His family moved to St. Louis, Missouri, and later to Chicago, Illinois. Beall earned a degree in art history from the University of Chicago and was active on the varsity track team coached by Amos Alonzo Stagg. Beall also took classes at the Art Institute of Chicago. After a short period of experimentation and professional work in Chicago, Beall moved to New York in 1935. The following year he established his home/office in Wilton, Connecticut.

According to his online AIGA biography by R. Roger Remington, "through the 1930s and 1940s Beall produced innovative and highly regarded work for clients including the Chicago Tribune, Sterling Engraving, The Art Directors Club of New York, Hiram Walker, Abbott Laboratories and Time magazine. Of particular interest was his work for the Crowell Publishing Company which produced Colliers magazine. Also of interest in this period are the remarkable poster series for the United States government's Rural Electrification Administration."

== Legacy and death ==
His clear and concise use of typography was highly praised both in the United States and abroad. Throughout his career he used bold primary colors and illustrative arrows and lines in a graphic style that became easily recognizable as his own. He eventually moved to rural New York and set up an office, and home, at a premises that he and his family called "Dumbarton Farm". He remained at the farm until his death in 1969. Lester was posthumously awarded the Lifetime Award from the Alliance Graphique Internationale (AGI) in 1993.

In May 2007, Swann Galleries in New York set an auction record price for Beall's 1939 photomontage poster promoting the Rural Electrification Administration's campaign to bring electricity to rural America. The image at right—considered one of the greatest American posters of all time—features a young boy and girl smiling and looking to the future as they lean against the wood fence bordering their farm. It sold for $38,400.
