= Silas Rhodes =

American educator (1915–2007)

- Born: September 15, 1915; The Bronx, New York City, U.S.
- Died: June 27, 2007 (aged 91); Katonah, New York
- Occupation: Educator
- Known for: Co-founding the School of Visual Arts
- Spouse: Beatrice
- Children: David, Andrew, Steven, Anthony

Silas H. Rhodes (September 15, 1915 – June 27, 2007) was an American educator and co-founder of a trade school for illustrators and cartoonists that eventually became the School of Visual Arts, one of the premier U.S. colleges for art and design.

== Early life and education ==
Rhodes was born and raised in the Bronx, New York City. His mother ran a failed wholesale egg business and his father worked for the U.S. Post Office as a postal clerk. Rhodes employed both of his parents in the administrative departments of the School of Visual Arts later in his life.

Rhodes received his bachelor's degree from Long Island University. He continued his education and obtained a master's degree from Columbia University. Rhodes wrote his dissertation on poet Robert Burns. He originally intended to become an English teacher, not a cartoonist.

== Military service ==
Rhodes enlisted in the U.S. Army following the Japanese attack on Pearl Harbor in 1941. He flew several missions with the Army's 1st Air Commando Group in China, Burma and India. Rhodes obtained a job with the Veterans Administration after World War II. Rhodes, along with illustrator Burne Hogarth, persuaded the VA to support an art school specifically to help veterans returning from the war. The school came to be known as the Cartoonists and Illustrators School, an expansion of Hogarth's Manhattan Academy of Newspaper Art.

== Founding the School of Visual Arts ==
Rhodes and Hogarth (best known for the comic strip Tarzan) along with James Boyle, founded the Cartoonists and Illustrators School in 1947. Most of the school's initial students were World War II veterans and Hogarth fans who worked during the day and enrolled in night courses. Many of his students had goals of breaking into advertising or publishing. The school was largely financed by the G.I. Bill and started with three faculty, including Rhodes, and 35 students. Rhodes helped to craft a curriculum that emphasized a liberal arts education with humanities courses, as well as the traditional studio arts classes.

Rhodes and Hogarth changed the name of the trade school to the School of Visual Arts in 1955.

== McCarthy era ==
Both Rhodes and Hogarth were summoned to Washington D.C. in 1956 as part of a United States Senate subcommittee investigation of suspected Communists. The Senate subcommittee was specifically trying to investigate whether Communist ideology had infiltrated vocational schools which were financed by the federal government, such as the School of Visual Arts.

Rhodes and Hogarth were asked whether they were members of the Communist Party. Both stated to the Senate that they had not been members of the Communist Party since the founding of the school in 1947. However, they invoked the Fifth Amendment when asked about Communist involvement prior to the founding of the school. Senator Joseph McCarthy stated that their refusal to testify proved that both were Communists.

Rhodes was quoted as saying to McCarthy, "I'll match my record against yours any day in the service. That's a horrible thing to say." McCarthy responded to Rhodes saying, "I don't doubt a bit you are a full-fledged Communist."

Silas Rhodes' son, David, later told The New York Times that his father had been a member of the Communist Party, but left in 1936, well before his military service in World War II or the founding of the school. The Veterans Administration audited the School of Visual Arts as part of their investigation. The government and the school later settled their grievances.

== Career ==
Rhodes served as president of the School of Visual Arts for six years. Rhodes guided the school's growth. Under his presidency, the School of Visual Arts became the largest independently run college of art in the country, with nearly 2,700 students, well up from its original 35 students. The school currently enrolls more than 3,300 undergrad and graduate students as of 2007. Rhodes successfully persuaded the New York State Board of Regents to allow the school to confer a bachelor's degree in fine arts in the 1970s.

He also worked as a humanities teacher, reflecting his past education at L.I.U. and Columbia University.

Rhodes served as the creative director for one of the signature public projects of the School of Visual Arts. He helped advise and create posters designed by the school's faculty which have been displayed on the New York City Subway system for over 50 years. The posters are used to recruit potential students and to promote the School of Visual Arts.

Rhodes remained active at the school as the chairman of the board of directors up until his death in 2007.

== Death ==
Rhodes died in his sleep at age 91 on June 27, 2007, at his home in Katonah, New York. He had spent the entire day working in his office.

Rhodes' wife, Beatrice, died in 2002. They had four children, David, Andrew, Steven and Anthony. However, he was survived by only three sons, David, Steven and Anthony and six grandchildren. David Rhodes currently serves as president of the School of Visual Arts, while Anthony P. Rhodes serves as executive vice president.

== Quote ==
Education is a moral affair and the ultimate concern of the school is with moral values, while society is concerned with such matters indirectly and only occasionally.
— Silas H. Rhodes in 1963
