= Will Burtin =

German graphic designer (1908–1972)

- Born: January 17, 1908; Cologne, Germany
- Died: January 18, 1972 (aged 64); New York City
- Occupation: Graphic Designer

Will Burtin (1908–1972) was a graphic designer from Cologne, Germany, known for interrelating design and scientific concepts within his exhibits. He was an influential designer, educator, and theorist in Germany and the United States. He arrived in the United States in 1939 after fleeing Nazism in Germany. In the U.S., he worked for Fortune Magazine and as an educator at Pratt Institute and the Parsons School of Design. He designed many exhibits for companies, such as Eastman Kodak, IBM, the Smithsonian, Mead Paper, Union Carbide, Herman Miller Furniture, and United States Information Agency. He received many awards and recognition for his work including a gold medal from AIGA. Many of his exhibits were reviewed in major consumer magazines, such as Newsweek and Life Magazine. He was inducted into the Art Directors Club Hall of Fame in 1974. Will Burtin died on January 18, 1972, in Mount Sinai Hospital in New York. Burtin's cause of death was mesothelioma, cancer caused by exposure to asbestos.

== Early life in Germany ==
Will Burtin was born in Cologne, Germany, to August and Gertrud Bürtin on January 27, 1908. Burtin's education was interrupted early during World War I when German armies took over his elementary school for cavalry barracks. Burtin also never graduated high school; instead, Burtin started studying topography at Handwerkskammer Köln. After graduation, Burtin studied graphic and industrial design at the Kölner Werkschulen (Cologne Academy of Fine and Applied Arts) in 1926. During his time studying topography and art, Burtin interned at the typesetting studio of Dr. Philippe Knöll. He worked for Knöll on exhibitions at GeSoLei in Düsseldorf.

In 1927, Burtin opened his own design studio in Cologne, in which he created booklets, posters, type books, exhibitions, displays, advertising, and movies for German, French, and other clients. He had this studio from 1927 to 1938. In 1930, Burtin started teaching in Berlin, where he met art student Hilde Munk. Burtin and Munk were married in 1932 and Munk became partner in her husband's design studio, Entwurfe Bürtin, (Designs by Burtin).

Prior to the war, the Nazi Party was determined to win over the public opinion, which brought Will Burtin name to the party's attention, hoping that he would accept the position of Art Director and supervise creation of propaganda designs. Nazi officials began asking Burtin to work for their cause, while also trying to persuade him to divorce his Jewish wife. Burtin was able to decline early Nazi attempts to hire him. Burtin always claimed that his work schedule was already too hectic to take on another responsibility. However, in 1937, Nazi Propaganda Minister Joseph Goebbels made an official request for Burtin to become the Ministry's Director of Design. Burtin cited his backlog of private clients in order to buy time.

Burtin's wife Hilde took advantage of this to write an urgent letter to her cousin, Max Munk, in Maryland. She asked him to sponsor the couple's immigration into the United States. Munk responded to Hilde's request by sending an affidavit. The affidavit, dated November 15, 1937, allowed Will and Hilde Burtin to get a U.S. visa. Meanwhile, back in Germany, Burtin was called to Berlin again, this time to meet Adolf Hitler in person. Burtin tried disqualifying himself from working in the Nazi Party by mentioning that his wife Hilde was Jewish. Unfortunately for Burtin, Hitler replied that his wife was not an issue and his first assignment would be to create an exhibit foretelling the impacts of Nazi culture. Again trying to buy time, Burtin asked for a short vacation to think it over. He was honoured, he replied, to be considered for this high-ranking post but he needed this vacation to be well rested prior to taking up his duties for the Nazi Party. Will and Hilde Burtin had already decided under no circumstances would they work for the Nazi Party. They were able to book passage on the Rotterdam and flee to New York City, leaving behind their personal belongings, taking only overnight bags to deceive border guards, and a sample sheet of the typeface Firmin Didot.

== Career in the United States ==
After arriving in the United States from Germany, the Burtins settled in New York City. Will Burtin was hired for his first job with Munk Aeronautical Laboratory, which was Hilde's cousin's Max Munk's laboratory. After working with Munk Aeronautical Laboratory, Burtin received a contract with the United States Federal Works Agency, in which he had to create one major exhibit that represented the achievements of five departments in the Federal Works Agency. The FWA required the exhibit to travel, meaning for it to be more than one-dimensional. The FWA taught Burtin how to create these types of designs in order for him to properly have this concept depicted in the exhibit. This is where Burtin first learned how to create three-dimensional designs; this technique helped him create many of his designs to come. In 1939, Burtin began teaching communication and advanced design at the Pratt Institute in Brooklyn, NY and later was named chairman of the Department of Visual Communication in 1959.

In 1943, Will Burtin was drafted into the United States Army and assigned to the Office of Strategic Services. Burtin was assigned to create gun manuals for the U.S. Air Force and Army Air Force. The manual was called Gunner's Information File: Flexible Gunnery. These gun manuals were being designed for the young soldiers in training. These manual were considered extremely important because they displayed vital information for trainees on how to handle their new firearm. Burtin, very concerned with the safety of the gunman, took this project very seriously. According to RIT's biography on Burtin, Will stated a gunman "was engaged in serious business in which his life might depend on the swift functioning of his knowledge and equipment". Because many of these soldiers drafted were uneducated and some illiterate, this manual had to be clear, precise, and easy to understand.

As World War II was ending, Burtin was recruited by the publisher of Fortune Magazine, straight from the Army. According to the publisher, it was in the "nation's interest" to let Burtin leave the army early to work for the magazine. He was recruited for the position of the Art Director, in which he remained from 1945 to 1949. Fortune did allow Burtin to do freelance work on the side which led to his partnership with the Upjohn Company and many others, such as Eastman Kodak, IBM, the Smithsonian, Mead Paper, Union Carbide, Herman Miller Furniture, and United States Information Agency. He was the designer and consultant on many of these clients' projects. Burtin conducted his freelance work through his design studio he opened up with Hilda in New York City, named Will Burtin, Inc., in 1949.

Burtin also taught advertising art briefly as a visiting instructor at Black Mountain College in 1946, part of staff roster that also included Josef and Anni Albers, Jacob and Gwendolyn Knight Lawrence, Leo Lionni, Leo Amino, Jean Varda, and others. In 1950, Burtin also started working at the Parsons School of Design, leading AIGA to name him a director with in the Institute.

=== United States Information Agency, 1958 ===
Through his contacts with the OSS, Burtin was able to obtain USIA as a regular client. The most successful exhibits made for USIA was "Kalamazoo…and how it grew!" Kalamazoo was selected by USIA to represent everyday life in an average American city, to be displayed to Europe. Burtin used personal thoughts and perspectives of the average citizen from Kalamazoo in this exhibit. This exhibit was so successful many different versions were created to be displayed in different European countries, such as England and Germany.

=== Eastman Kodak, 1960–1962 ===
In 1962, Burtin was able to gain Eastman Kodak as another major client. Burtin's work with Eastman Kodak included new construction techniques and a unique roof design. The goal was to create the illusion that Kodak's roof was a sea of clouds adults and children could walk on. These new techniques and designs brought considerable attention to Burtin's Eastman Kodak Pavilion at the 1964–1965 World's Fair. According to The Will Burtin Papers, the pavilion included an "eighty foot high photo tower and moon deck". Due to constant dispute with Kodak, Burtin's agreement with the company was ceased before the pavilion was officially built; the Concrete Industry Board gave Burtin a special award in 1964 for its design.

=== Union Carbide, 1962 ===
Union Carbide was developing uranium to make nuclear fuel; therefore the company launched a huge campaign surrounding this and requested Burtin to design "The Atom in Action". His exhibit was showcased at Union Carbide's headquarters in New York City and represented the physics of nuclear energy. The depiction of the density of atomic energy was also presented. This exhibit also became a huge successful and remained popular for many years. "The Atom in Action" was exhibited at Union Carbide headquarters for several years.

=== Upjohn Company, 1949–1971 ===
Burtin took the position as art director of Upjohn Company's publication Scope, while still art directing for Fortune, but did leave Fortune the same year. Scope was a magazine dedicated to conveying medical, scientific and pharmaceutical information. In 1959, Upjohn conducted a survey to see how many doctors or medical workers viewed their publication and the results were not as they would have liked. These results led Burtin to suggest one of the most notable projects he would design for Upjohn, creating a model of a human cell. "The Cell" exhibit was the first exhibit Burtin would design that demonstrated a human function as a gigantic three-dimensional visual. As explained in the book Design and Science: the Life and Work of Will Burtin, "The Cell demonstrated the inter relatedness of cellular function, linkage among organelles, and a vision – Burtin's vision – of a cell's physical structure." Being biology had not yet found out all the functions of a human cell, the exhibit was described as a "generalized" human cell. "The Cell" was an instant success, reaching several U.S. cities, including San Francisco, Kalamazoo, New York City, and Chicago. The exhibit also reached England. The exhibit was reviewed in Newsweek and Life Magazine and reached about 40 million people. Due to the huge success with "The Cell", Burtin went on to create many other exhibits representing biology principles for Upjohn Company, including "The Brain" and "The Chromosome", both were very successful.

Burtin received many awards for his designs. He received the Art Directors Club medal in 1939, 1941, 1955 and 1958. He received the AMA award in 1958 for his exhibit of The Cell. In 1971, Burtin was awarded a gold medal from AIGA for all his successful contributions to the field of design. He was inducted into the Art Directors Club Hall of Fame in 1974.

== Style ==
Mr. Burtin's own practice had transcended the "commercial art" model prevalent in the 1950s and 60s. He went on to merge design theory with education and technology. Will Burtin focused on the relationship between spatial forms and their functions. With a designer's vision, he saw how molecules of a certain shape could be expressed through visual art. Examples of Burtin's work include "The Cell", "The Genes in Action", and other processes or microstructures that required a unique understanding of both art and science. His work was publicized in world press and a variety of scientific journals.

== Personal life ==
In 1930, Burtin started teaching in Berlin, where he met art student Hilde Munk. Burtin and Munk were married in 1932. Will and Hilda Burtin spent most of their lives dedicated to design and typography. Both worked in Burtin's design studio. The couple had one child named Carol, born on October 10, 1942. Will and Hilda were married from 1932 to 1960, when Hilda lost her battle to cancer. Hilda Burtin died on October 10, 1960. She was fifty years old at the time her death; Will and a friend stood by her side as she passed. October 10, 1960, was the same day as the Burtins' daughter, Carol, had her eighteenth birthday. Will was determined to hide the sad news from his daughter Carol; he had a friend call the next day, October 11, to break the news of her mother's death. Will kept this a secret until he passed and it wasn't until seeing a copy of her mother's death certificate did Carol realize her father's effort to shield the sad news from her.

In January 1961, Burtin remarried the graphic designer Cipe Pineles, a long time family friend. Burtin and his daughter Carol moved in with Pineles because their house had too many sad memories of Hilda Burtin. Pineles later adopted Carol in 1973, after the passing of Will Burtin.

Will Burtin died on January 18, 1972, in Mount Sinai Hospital in New York. Burtin's cause of death was mesothelioma, which is cancer caused by exposure to asbestos. George Klauber, a long time friend, was by Burtin's side at the time of his death. Burtin's doctor determined it was possible Hilda Burtin died of the same cancer, which was unnamed at the time of her death.

== Dedication ==
After Burtin's death in 1972, The Cleveland Health Museum and Education Center took The Cell, Defense of Life, The Brain, and The Chromosome as permanent exhibits.

A biography of Will Burtin, "Design and Science: The Life and Work of Will Burtin" was published in 2007 by Lund Humphries, in London; jointly with Ashgate Publishing, in New York. Authors: R. Roger Remington and Robert S. P. Fripp, Burtin's son-in-law.
