= Henry Wolf =

American graphic designer (1925–2005)

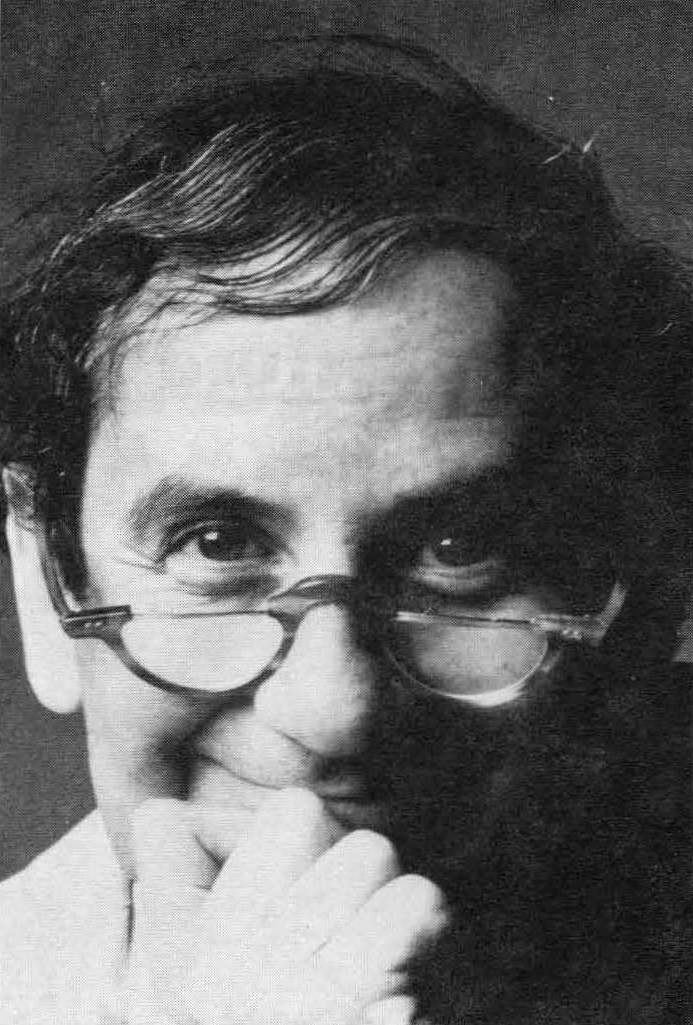
- Wolf circa 1980
- Born: May 23, 1925; Vienna, Austria
- Died: February 14, 2005 (aged 79); New York, New York, U.S.
- Occupations: Art director, graphic designer, photographer, author, teacher
- Years active: 1946–2005

Henry Wolf (May 23, 1925 – February 14, 2005) was an Austrian-born, American graphic designer, photographer and art director. He influenced and energized magazine design during the 1950s and 1960s with his bold layouts, elegant typography, and whimsical cover photographs while serving as art director at Esquire, Bazaar, and Show magazines. Wolf opened his own photography studio, Henry Wolf Productions, in 1971, while also teaching magazine design and photography classes. In 1976, he was awarded the American Institute of Graphic Arts Medal for Lifetime Achievement and, in 1980, was inducted into the New York Art Directors Club Hall of Fame.

== Early life and education ==
Henry Wolf was born into a Jewish family in Vienna, Austria, on May 23, 1925. With the Anschluss and Nazi occupation of Austria in 1938, his secure childhood in Vienna ended, and his family left Austria and began a three-year odyssey through France and North Africa. Wolf studied art in Paris, but after hiding from the Germans and living in two detention camps in Morocco, the family relocated to the United States in 1941. He continued his art studies at New York City's School of Industrial Art. Wolf joined the Army in 1943, serving with an intelligence unit in the Pacific until 1946.

== Career ==
Wolf worked with photographers Richard Avedon, Melvin Sokolsky and Art Kane before he launched his own photography studio on the Upper East Side of Manhattan. He became the art director of Esquire, in 1952, his designs becoming the sophisticated image for which the magazine is now known.[3] In 1958, he became the art director of Harper's Bazaar, succeeding Alexey Brodovitch and worked with Richard Avedon and Man Ray. After a tenure of three years at Harper's Bazaar, he left to start a new a new progressive arts magazine Show for A&P heir Huntington Hartford.

In 1965, Wolf began working for McCann Erickson where he directed high-profile advertisement campaigns like Alka-Seltzer, Buick, Gillette, and Coca-Cola. he later joined advertising executive Jane Trahey, forming Trahey/Wolf, serving as vice president and creative director. For the next few years, Wolf worked on many commercial campaigns, including Saks Fifth Avenue and I Magnin, as well as advertisements for Xerox, IBM, Revlon, De Beers, Blackgama Mink, Charles of the Ritz, Elizabeth Arden, and Union Carbide.

In 1971, Wolf launched Henry Wolf Productions, a studio devoted to photography, film, and design. For the next three decades, he worked as both photographer and designer, creating over 500 television commercials and nine films, shooting for Van Cleef & Arpels, RCA, Revlon, Borghese, Olivetti and Karastan among others. His work was published in many magazines, including Esquire, Town and Country, Domus, and New York.

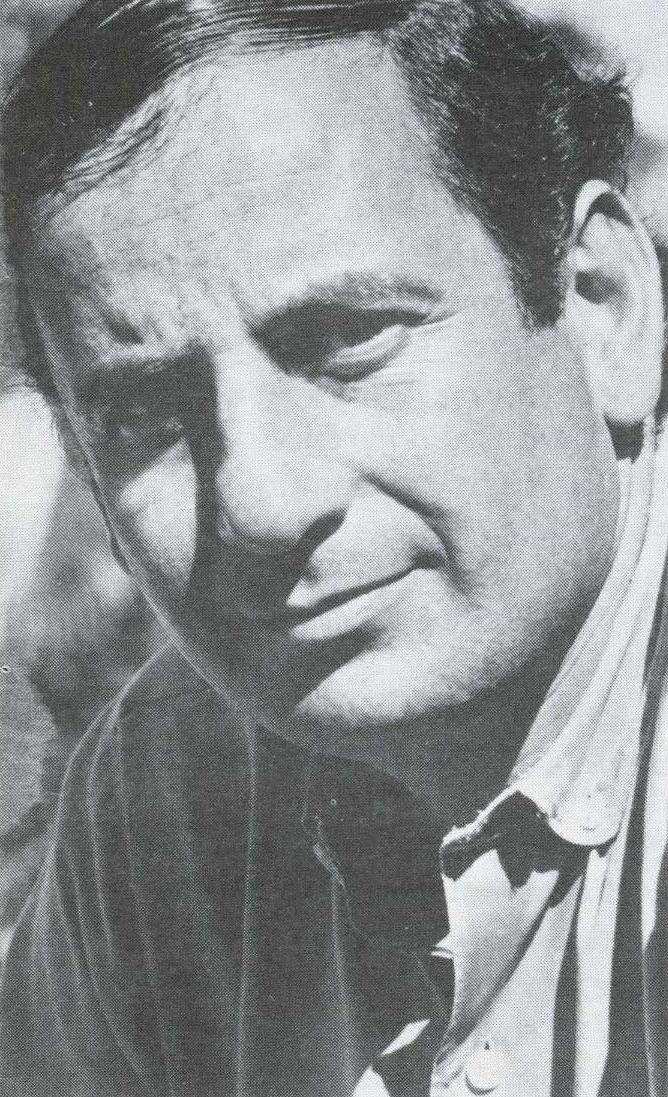
Wolf circa 1978

Wolf taught graphic design at Parsons School of Design in New York City, as well as the School of Visual Arts and The Cooper Union.

== Personal life ==
Henry Wolf died on February 14, 2005, just short of age 80.

== Awards ==
- Received the American Institute of Graphic Arts Lifetime Achievement Award on October 12, 1976,
- Inducted in the Art Directors Club Hall of Fame and the Royal Society of Arts in 1980
- Received the Herb Lubalin Award from the Society of Publication Designers in 1989
- Awarded Doctor of Fine Arts honorary degree by Parsons School of Design in 1996

== Publications ==
- Wolf, Henry. Visual Thinking: Methods for Making Images Memorable (1988) *Wolf, Henry. Photographed by Henry Wolf
- Kane, Art. Photography Book (with introduction by Henry Wolf)
- AIG Henry Wolf: A Retrospective (1976)

== See also ==
- List of AIGA medalists
