= School of Visual Arts =

Art school in New York

- Former names: Cartoonists and Illustrators School (1947–1956)
- Type: Private for-profit art school
- Established: 1947
- Affiliations: AICAD
- President: Christopher Cyphers, Interim President
- Faculty: 971
- Undergraduates: 2,901 (fall 2025)
- Postgraduates: 524 (fall 2025)
- Location: New York City, New York
- Campus: Urban
- Website: sva.edu

The School of Visual Arts New York City (SVA NYC) is a private for-profit art school in Manhattan. It was founded in 1947 and is a member of the Association of Independent Colleges of Art and Design.

== History ==
This school was started by Silas H. Rhodes and Burne Hogarth in 1947 as the Cartoonists and Illustrators School, with three teachers and 35 students, most of whom were World War II veterans who had a large part of their tuition underwritten by the US government's G.I. Bill. It was renamed the School of Visual Arts in 1956 and offered its first degrees in 1972. In 1983, it introduced a Master of Fine Arts in painting, drawing and sculpture.

In 2024, the intersection of 23rd Street and 3rd Avenue was co-named SVA Way to recognize the school's institutional presence in the neighborhood since 1960.

On September 1, 2025, ownership of the school transitioned from the Rhodes family to the SVA Alumni Society. This was part of a plan which began in 2019 as the school began the process of converting to a nonprofit organization; the SVA alumni organization is already an IRS tax-exempt entity.

== Academics ==
The school has a faculty of more than 1,100 and a student body of over 3,000. It offers undergraduate and master's degree programs and is accredited by the Middle States Commission on Higher Education and the National Association of Schools of Art and Design.

The interior design Bachelor of Fine Arts degree program is accredited by the Council for Interior Design Accreditation. The art therapy Master of Professional Studies degree program is approved by the American Art Therapy Association. The art education Master of Arts degree program is accredited by the Council for the Accreditation of Educator Preparation.

The continuing education division offers noncredit courses from most departments; a selection of advertising, branding, cartooning, copywriting, illustration and marketing courses taught in Spanish; professional development and corporate training courses; and summer residency programs. The school also offers short-term study abroad programs in various creative fields.

== Campus and locations ==
The school has several buildings in the Gramercy Park neighborhood, on Manhattan's east side, and in the Chelsea neighborhood, on the west side. There is a residence hall on Ludlow Street, on the Lower East Side. From 1994 to 1997, it had a branch campus in Savannah, Georgia which was closed following a lawsuit from the Savannah College of Art and Design.

=== Library ===
The library holds books, periodicals, audio recordings, films and other media; the Milton Glaser Design Study Center and Archives, which comprises the collections of Chermayeff & Geismar, Seymour Chwast, Heinz Edelmann, Milton Glaser, Steven Heller, Ed McCabe, James McMullan, Tony Palladino, George Tscherny and Henry Wolf; and the SVA Archives, a repository for materials pertaining to the college's history.

=== West 21st Street buildings ===
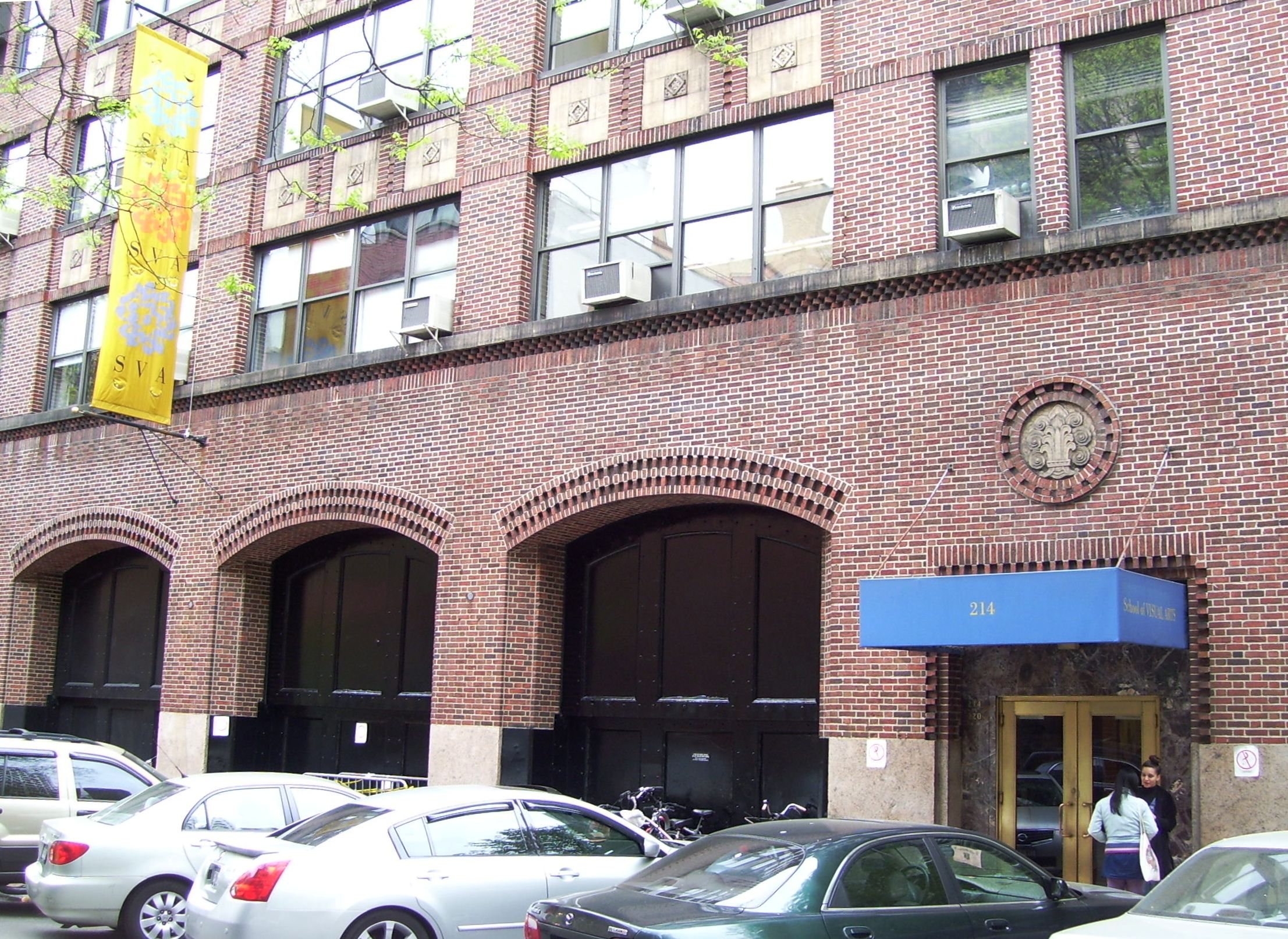
The 214 East 21st Street building

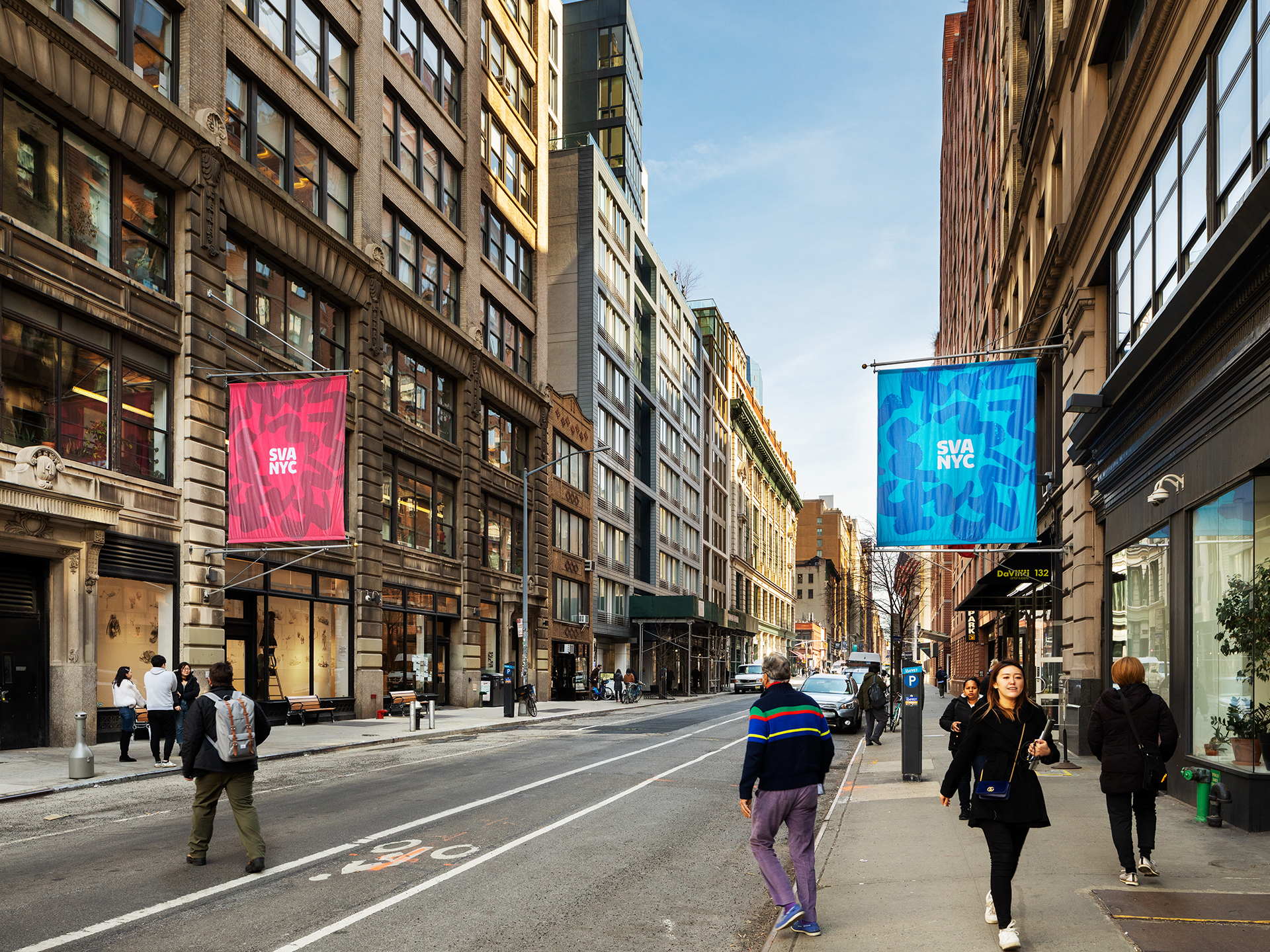
West 21st Street buildings

The building at 133 to 141 West 21st Street, between Sixth Avenue and Seventh Avenue in Chelsea, has studios for drawing and painting classes, and a small library called Library West which houses books specifically on animation, comics, illustration and art therapy.

The buildings at 132 and 136 West 21st Street have offices, classrooms and studios for art criticism, art education, art therapy, cartooning, computer art, design, illustration and writing. The building at 132 West 21st Street houses the Visible Futures Lab, a workshop featuring traditional and emerging fabrication technology, which regularly hosts artists in residence.

=== Residence halls ===
There are several residence halls available for students at SVA, including:

- 23rd Street Residence (formerly New Residence), at 215 East 23rd Street, is an apartment-style dormitory reserved for new students.
- 24th Street Residence, is a 146,000-square-foot (13,600 m^{2}), 14-story residence hall that opened in August 2016. The site was purchased by Magnum Real Estate Group and 40 North in April 2015 for $32.25 million from the nonprofit International Center for the Disabled. It houses 505 residents in 242 suites, including office space, and serves as the flagship residence hall for the school.
- Gramercy Women's Residence, at 17 Gramercy Park, is an apartment-style dormitory reserved for upper year students alongside Gramercy Park.
- Ludlow Residence, at 101 Ludlow Street (abutting Delancey Street), on the Lower East Side, opened in 2009. This tower has 259 single and 47 double rooms.

==== Former residence halls ====
- George Washington Residence, at 23 Lexington Avenue (between 23rd Street and 24th Street).

=== SVA Galleries ===
SVA maintains three permanent gallery locations across its campus—SVA Gramercy Gallery, SVA Flatiron Gallery, and SVA Chelsea Gallery—which exhibit work from both students and established creative professionals. Every year, the SVA Chelsea Gallery stages an exhibition for its Masters Series recipient, who are honored with both an award and retrospective exhibition. The 2022 Masters Series Recipient was MacArthur Genius Grant- and Pulitzer Prize-winning photographer Lynsey Addario for her documentation of civilian life in conflict zones; the retrospective was covered by publications such as The New York Times, The Guardian, and Vanity Fair.

=== Theatre ===
SVA Theatre
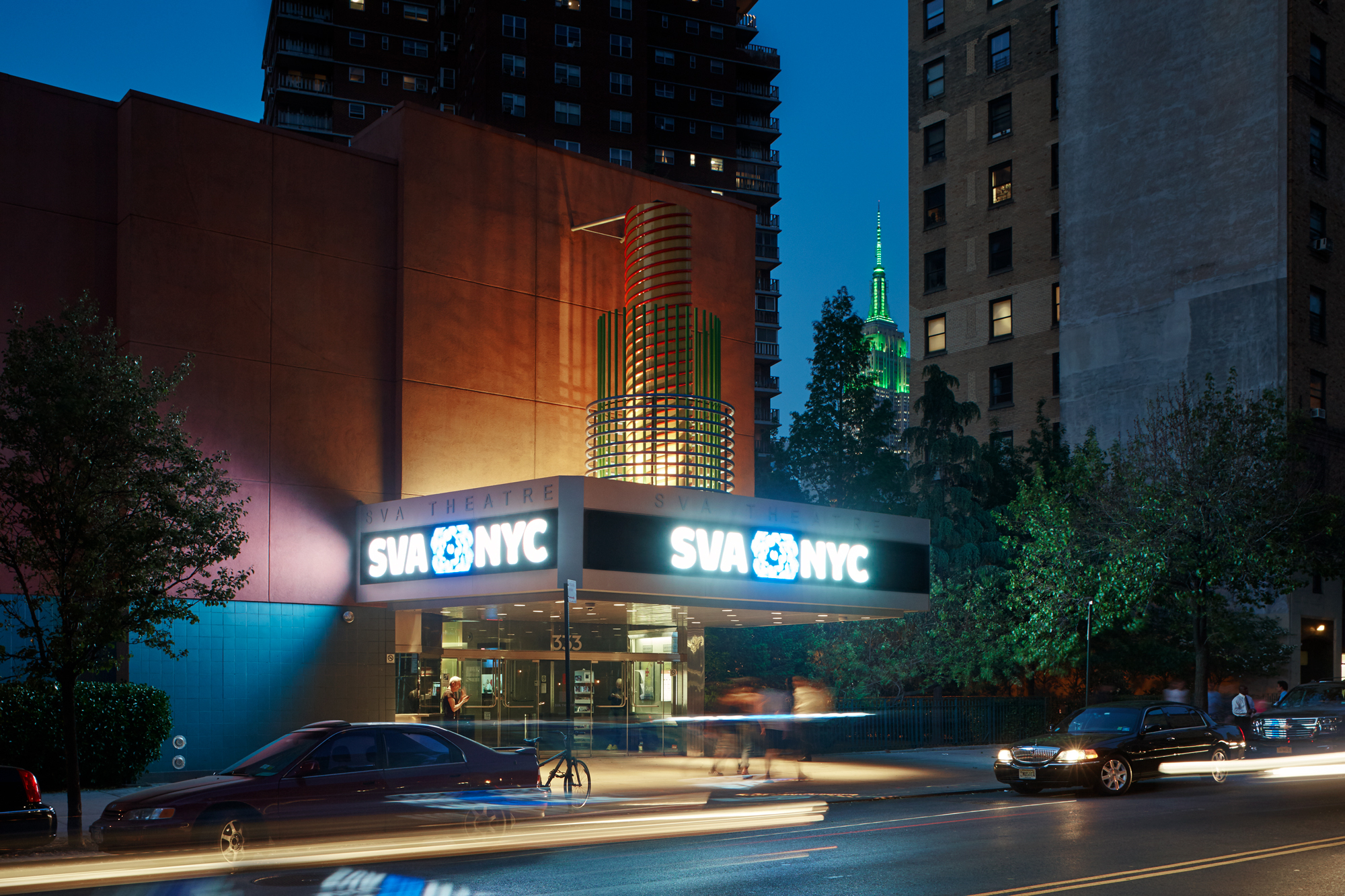
- The theater in 2022
- Interactive map of SVA Theatre
- Former names: 23rd Street Theatre
- Address: 333 West 23rd Street
- Location: New York City, New York
- Coordinates: 40.7461922°N 73.9998454°W
- Owner: School of Visual Arts
- Capacity: 480 (Silas), 265 (Beatrice)

Construction
- Opened: 1963
- Renovated: 2008
- Architect: Milton Glaser

Website
- svatheatre.com

The Theatre, also known as the SVA Theatre, is at 333 West 23rd Street, between Eighth Avenue and Ninth Avenue, in Chelsea.

The site was formerly called the 23rd Street Theatre, It first opened as an RKO theatre to replace the former Grand Opera House. It later served as the home of the Roundabout Theatre Company, from 1972 until 1984; when their lease expired, the venue was converted into a movie theatre, the Clearview Chelsea West Cinema.

It was purchased in 2008, renovated, and reopened in January 2009. Milton Glaser designed the theatre's renovated interior and exterior, including the sculpture situated atop its marquee. The 20,000-square-foot (1,900 m^{2}) facility houses two separate auditoriums, one with 265 seats and one with 480, and hosts class meetings, lectures, screenings and other public events. It has also hosted the red-carpet New York première of Ethan Hawke's The Daybreakers and a diverse list of world premières, ranging from Lucy Liu's 2010 feature documentary Redlight, to the 2011 Fox animated comedy Allen Gregory; and the 2012 film The Hunger Games. In 2013, Beyoncé held a release party and screening for her self-titled visual album at the theatre. Community partners that have used the theatre include the Tribeca and GenArt film festivals, Mayor Michael Bloomberg's PlaNYC environmental initiative, and the Mayor's Office of Film, Theatre & Broadcasting. The theater is also home to the Dusty Film & Animation Festival, held annually since 1990, which showcases the work of emerging filmmakers and animators from the college's BFA Film and Video and BFA Animation programs.

=== Gallery ===
The Ludlow Residence (2021)

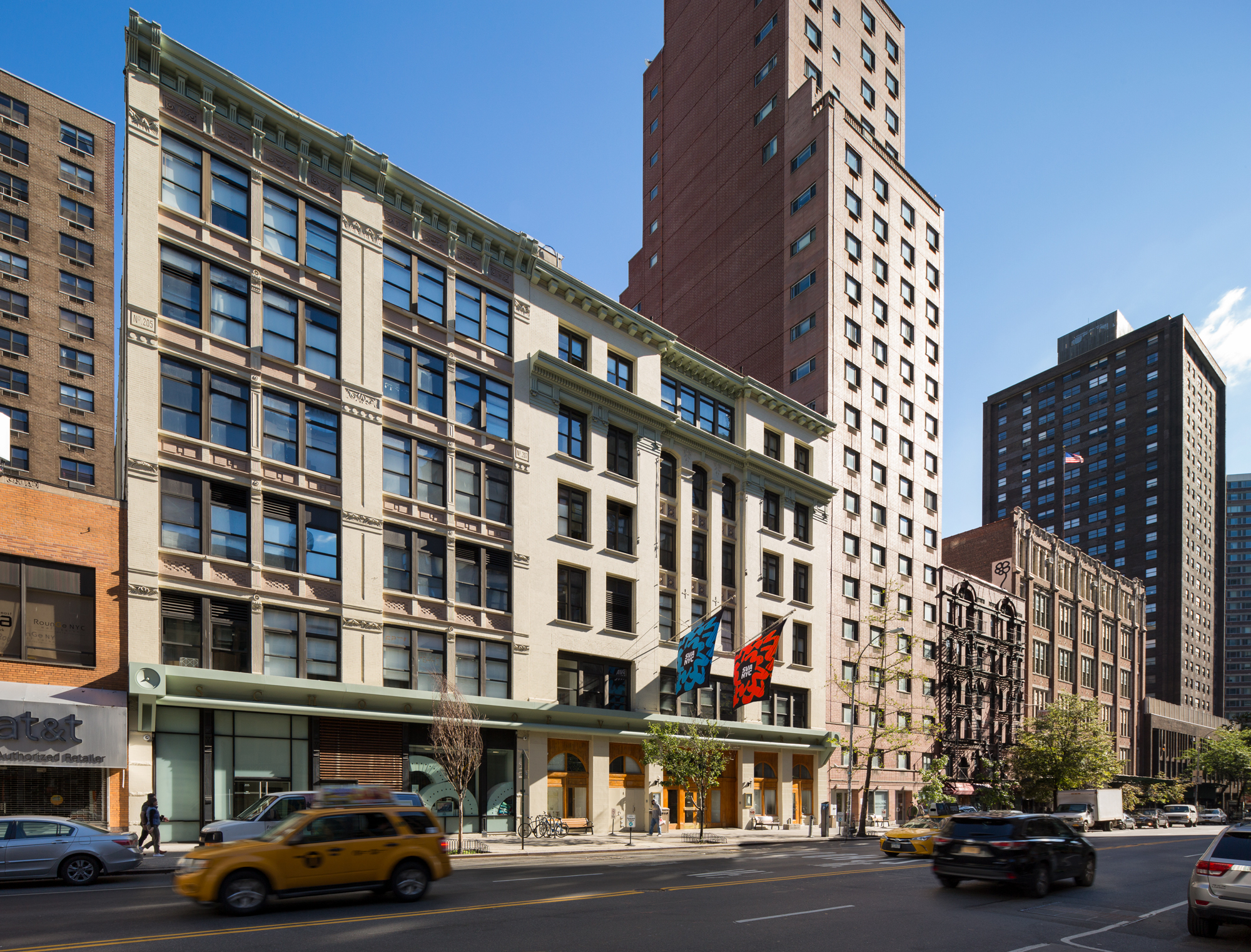
209 East 23rd Street

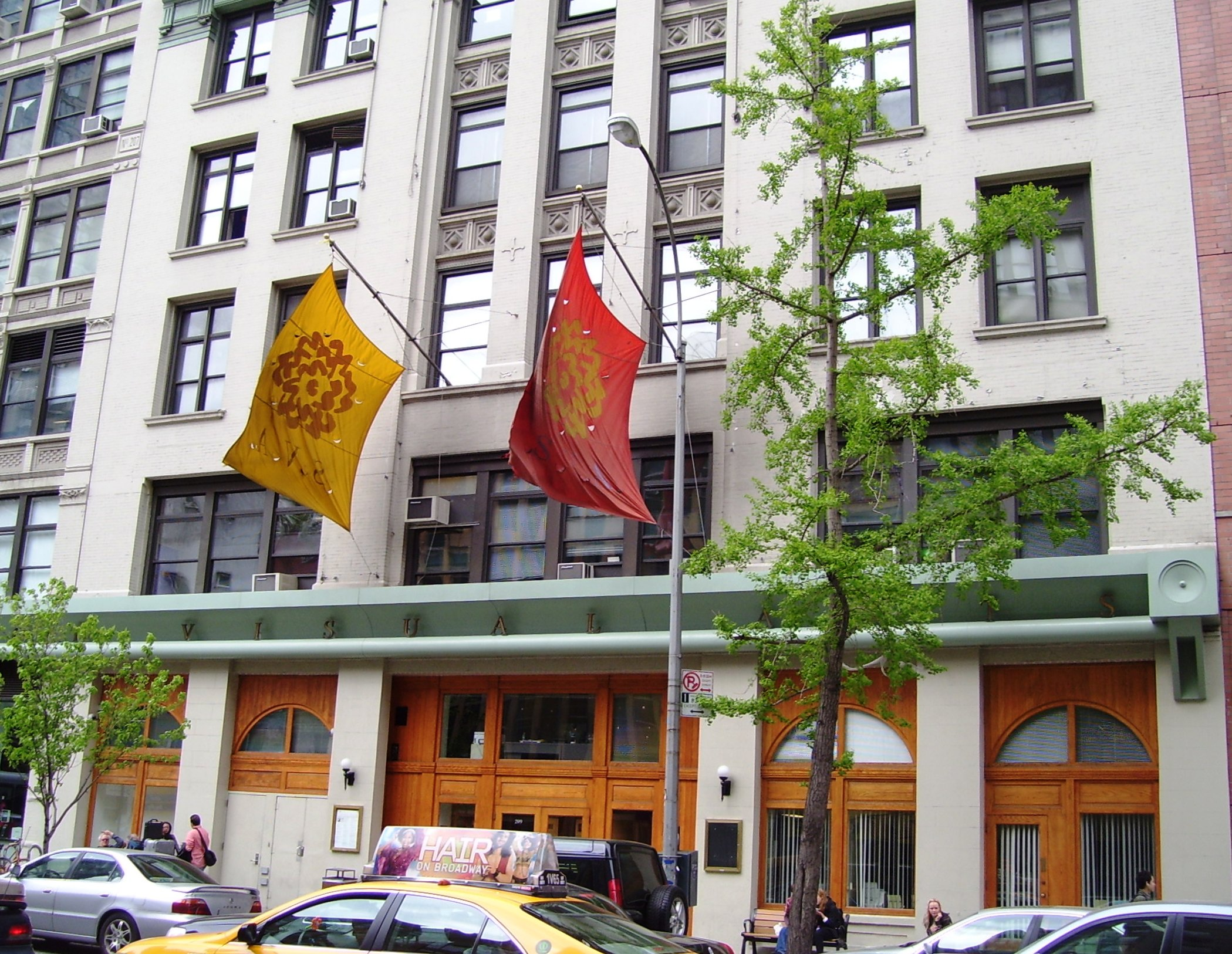
Close-up of 209 East 23rd Street

== Marketing and promotion ==
=== Subway posters ===
Since its establishment in 1947, SVA has been notable for running annual advertising campaigns across the New York City subway system that feature original artworks by prominent designers and school's faculty members like Milton Glaser, Paula Scher, Ivan Chermayeff, Louise Fili, and George Tscherny. As of 2023, the resulting collection contains over 200 posters, some of which have been exhibited in more than 10 countries including India, Italy, Ireland, Serbia, Turkey, Argentina, and Brazil.
