= Art Directors Club of New York =

American organization for art directors

The Art Directors Club of New York is an organization for art directors in New York City. It was founded in 1920, and has grown as an industry group, promoting art directors' work through exhibitions and awards, including the annual DESI award for design excellence.

== History ==
The Art Directors Club of New York (sometimes referred to as the ADC) was founded in 1920 by Louis Pedlar and Earnest Elmo Calkins. With Fred Lamb, Calkins had organized the first advertising art exhibits in New York City in 1908, and saw a need for an organization that would “dignify the field of business art in the eyes of artists”, emphasizing his belief that “artistic excellence is vitally necessary to successful advertising”. By 1947, the Club's work was being credited with a gradual increase in advertising art standards throughout the United States.

In 1921, the club hosted their first juried exhibition with original work from over 250 contributors. The exhibition organized by Calkins and opened with an inaugural dinner on March 2, 1921. The awards that evening went to: Fred R. Cruger for black and white illustration; W.E. Hoitland for painting; and Rene Clark for poster design.

The Art Directors Club was restrictive in its membership during its early years. Women were not admitted until 1942. George Olden, an art director with the Columbia Broadcasting Company, was the first African-American member, having been elected to the Club in 1952.

The Art Directors' Club includes art directors working in film and New media.

The Club inspired many similar initiatives around the world, such as Design and Art Direction (London, 1964), Le Club des D.A. (Paris, 1967) and the Art Directors Club of Europe (Barcelona, 1990).

=== Logo ===
The first logo was an interpretation of Albrecht Dürer’s signature. In 2009, ADC rebranded with the help of Trollbäck + Company. The new logo moved away from a monogram and introducing a word mark in bold hues. In 2014, they updated their logo with a monogram created by Sid Lee that references historical ADC monograms.

== Awards ==
=== ADC Annual Awards ===
Earnest Elmo Calkins organized the first juried exhibition in 1921. The ADC evolved this exhibition into its ADC Annual Awards that receives up to 11,000 entries from around the world. Several awards are given out annually to recognize industry excellence internationally. The Award for Design Excellence is known as the "DESI" award. The main categories for the award, as of 2012, are: Advertising; Design; Illustration; Integrated; Interactive; Motion; Photography; and Special Awards.

=== ADC Young Guns ===
In 1991, ADC created the Young Guns award. ADC Young Guns are annual international awards given out to promising art directors under the age of 30. ADC GrandMasters recognizes experienced educators in art direction who have created a notable legacy in the industry.

=== ADC Hall of Fame ===
In 1971, ADC established their Hall of Fame. Those chosen for the Hall of Fame have made significant contributions throughout their lifetime to the graphic design profession.

== Art Directors Annual ==
The Art Directors Annual is a review of the year's outstanding achievements in art direction. It has appeared yearly since 1922.

== See also ==
- Art director
- Type Directors Club
- Communication Arts
- Adweek
- D&AD
