= John Alcorn (artist) =

American commercial artist, illustrator and designer

- Alcorn at his drawing board at his house in Lyme, Connecticut, 1989
- Born: February 10, 1935; Corona, New York City, U.S.
- Died: January 27, 1992 (aged 56)
- Education: Cooper Union
- Known for: Graphic design, Film titles, Children's books
- Awards: see full list below

John Alcorn (February 10, 1935 – January 27, 1992) was an American commercial artist and designer, and an illustrator of children's books. He was associated with the visual style developed at Push Pin Studios, which helped reshape American commercial illustration during the 1960s through the revival and reinterpretation of historical graphic styles.

In addition to his accomplishments in the areas of packaging, corporate and dimensional design, Alcorn designed the opening titles for several Federico Fellini films. During his career, Alcorn created numerous book jackets and paperback covers, and his work appeared in many major exhibits.

== Biography ==
=== Early life and education ===
A native New Yorker, John Alcorn was born in Corona, Queens, in 1935. His maternal grandparents were born in Settimo Rottaro, a village in northern Piedmont, Italy. When he was five years old, his family moved to Great Neck, Long Island. He was educated in the local schools. He studied graphic arts at The Cooper Union. During his first two years at Cooper Union, he studied drawing, calligraphy, architecture, the mechanics of typography, and dimensional design. In his last year, his studies consisted of illustration, graphics and advertising design.

=== Early career ===
Alcorn's early career included work in the art department of Esquire magazine, a brief stint with a pharmaceutical advertising agency, and sound training at the Push Pin Studios, the celebrated design studio founded by Milton Glaser, Seymour Chwast, Reynold Ruffins, and Edward Sorel.

In 1958, Alcorn joined CBS Radio and subsequently the CBS-TV art department, where he worked with Lou Dorfsman. In 1961, Alcorn left CBS to work as a freelancer.

=== 1960s ===
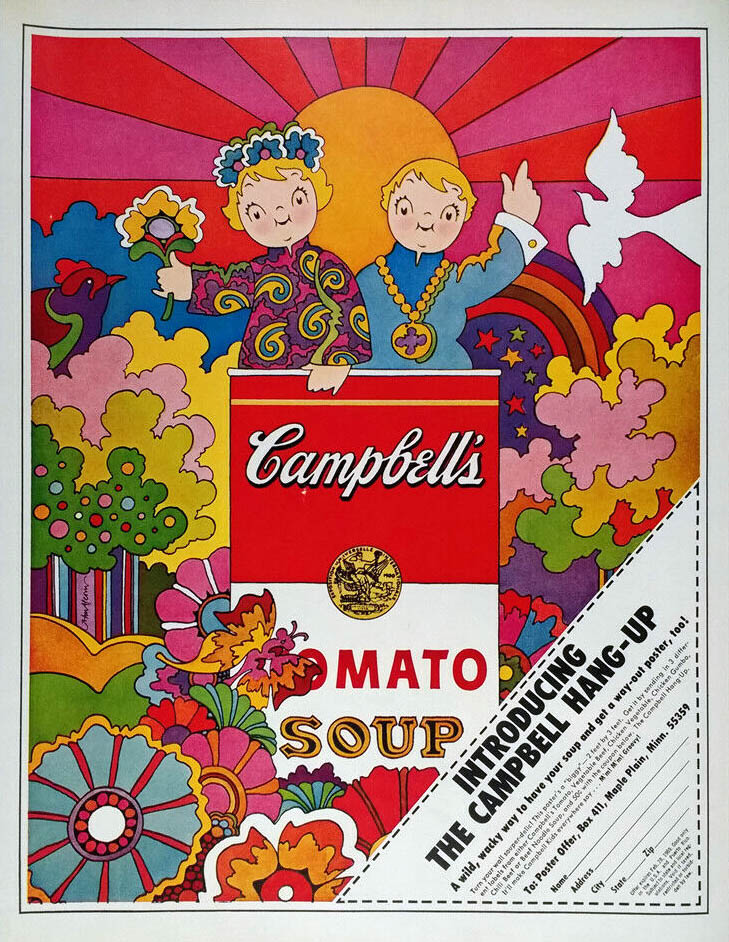
Campbell's Tomato Soup poster by Alcorn, 1968

In 1962, Alcorn designed and illustrated Books! by Murray McCain, which was selected as one of the best fifty books of the year by the American Institute of Graphic Arts. His other illustrations for children's books include The Abecedarian Book, Where in the World Do You Live?, Money Round the World, A Letter to Anywhere, as well as books for language teaching (La Petite Famille, La Festa). In 1969, Alcorn's book Pocahontas in London won the "Critici in Erba" Prize at the 6th Bologna Children's Book Fair.

Besides book illustrations, Alcorn designed numerous paperback covers, jackets, editorials, posters and advertisements. He worked with leading publishers such as Simon& Schuster, Little, Brown and Company, Pantheon Books, Random House, and others. In 1969, Alcorn was invited to join a group of international artists who were selected to create illustrations for Alan Aldridge's The Beatles Illustrated Lyrics. Alcorn was assigned to interpret the song Eight Days a Week.

Alcorn created a series of works for Morgan Press: covers for its catalogues and yearly calendars (from 1963 through 1971).

In 1970, Alcorn received the Augustus Saint-Gaudens Award.

In 1971, the Japanese magazine IDEA dedicated an issue to John Alcorn's work and described him as one of the principal protagonists of the contemporary American graphic design.

=== Italian Period ===
In 1969, John Alcorn visited the village where his maternal grandparents were born, and was fascinated by the country and its culture. He spent two subsequent summers in Italy traveling across the country. In 1971, Alcorn and his family moved to Florence. He started collaborating with the Rizzoli publishing house and played an important role in redesigning the brand, its book covers and catalogues. Alcorn created the title designs for Federico Fellini's film Amarcord as well as Ginger and Fred and And the Ship Sails On.

=== Return to the United States ===
In 1977, Alcorn moved back to the United States, and worked on designing book covers and illustrations for various publishing houses (e.g., Knopf, Simon& Schuster, Atheneum, Random House, etc) as well as designing advertising materials.

=== Personal life ===
Following graduation from Cooper Union, Alcorn married and in 1962 settled in Ossining, New York, where he lived with his wife Phyllis, and their four sons. In 1971 he moved with his family to Florence, Italy. In 1977 he returned with his family to the United States, settling in Cold Spring, New York. In 1983 Alcorn and his wife moved to Hamburg Cove in Lyme, Connecticut.

== Exhibitions and collections ==
Group exhibitions:

- The Push Pin Style, (Paris, Louvre, Musée des Arts Décoratifs, March 18-May 18, 1970); Milan, Castello Sforzesco, Sala Balla, May 25-June 25, 1971).
- Grafica sperimentale per la stampa, 36° Venice Biennale, 1972.
- Stephen, Sabina & John Alcorn, Atrium Gallery, School of Fine Arts/Department of Art, University of Connecticut at Storrs, December 5–23, 1988.
- Stephen & John Alcorn, Lustrare Gallery, Soho, New York, October 29-November 23, 1991.

One-Man exhibitions:

- New York Art Directors Club, late 1960s.
- Peter Cooper Gallery, New York, February 2–26, 1970.
- John Alcorn, Hopkins Center, Dartmouth College, 1970.
- Gallerie Delpire, Paris, December 1971.
- Centro Rizzoli, Galleria Vittorio Emanuele, Milan, December 2, 1975 - January 6, 1976.
- Beaumont-May Gallery & Artist in Residence, Dartmouth College, 1981.

== Awards ==
John Alcorn received numerous awards from the New York Art Directors Club, the Society of Illustrators, AIGA (The American Institute of Graphic Arts), the Society of Publication Designers, and others. In 1968, he won first prize at the Bologna Children's Book Fair. He was the recipient of the prestigious Augustus Saint-Gaudens Medal from Cooper Union. In 1970, he was selected as the first graphic artist to be Artist-In-Residence at Dartmouth College. In 1987, he was Artist-In-Residence at the Maryland Institute College of Art. Other awards include:

- New York Times choice of Best Illustrated Children's Books of the Year
  - 1962 for Books!
  - 1966, for Wonderful Time

== Illustration work ==
Books illustrated by Alcorn are all for children, except as indicated.

- Wadeeha Atiyeh, "Scheherazade Cooks!," Channel Press, 1960 (cookbook)
- Murray McCain, Books! (nonfiction), J. Cape, 1962
- Al Hine, Where in the World Do You Live? (fiction), Harcourt, 1962
- Mary Kay Phelan, The Circus, Holt, 1963
- Ogden Nash, Everyone but Thee and Me (adult poems), Dent, 1963
- Hine, Money Round the World, Harcourt, 1963
- Stella Standard, The Art of Fruit Cookery, Doubleday, 1964
- Sesyle Joslin, The Petite Famille (French language reader), Harcourt, 1964
- Television Note Book: 1964, Columbia Broadcasting System, Inc., 1964
- McCain, Writing! (nonfiction), Ariel, 1964. Hine, A Letter to Anywhere (nonfiction), Harcourt, 1964
- Marie Winn and Alan Miller, The Fireside Book of Children's Songs, Simon & Schuster, 1966
- Phyllis McGinley, Wonderful Time (poems), Lippincott, 1966
- Joslin, La Fiesta (Spanish language reader), Harcourt, 1967
- Jan Wahl, Pocahontas in London (fiction), Delacorte, 1967
- Martin Gardner, Never Make Fun of a Turtle, My Son (poems), Simon & Schuster, 1969
- One, Two, Three, Hallmark, 1970
- The Great Book of Puzzles and Perplexities, 1978

He also illustrated and designed numerous book jackets and paperback covers, two print catalogs, and contributed illustrations to many periodicals, including McCall's, Playboy, and Sports Illustrated.
