= List of Fiorello H. LaGuardia High School alumni =

The following people are notable alumni of New York City's Fiorello H. LaGuardia High School (LaG) and its two legacy schools, The High School of Music & Art (MA), and High School of Performing Arts (PA).

== Actors ==
- Nadia Alexander (LaG)
- Pico Alexander (LaG)
- Jennifer Aniston (LaG)
- Hale Appleman (LaG)
- Karina Arroyave (PA)
- Morena Baccarin (LaG)
- Ellen Barkin (PA)
- Zazie Beetz (LaG)
- Richard Benjamin (PA)
- Corbin Bleu (LaG)
- Chaz Bono (LaG)
- Julie Bovasso (MA)
- Adrien Brody (LaG, 1991)
- Cara Buono (LaG)
- Charles Busch (MA)
- Owen Campbell
- Pauline Chalamet (LaG)
- Timothée Chalamet (LaG)
- Thom Christopher (PA)
- Lorna Courtney (LaG)
- Keith David (PA)
- Michael DeLorenzo (PA)
- Dom DeLuise (PA)
- Micaela Diamond (LaG)
- Dagmara Domińczyk
- Ansel Elgort (LaG)
- Omar Epps (LaG)
- Alex Garfin (LaG)
- Sarah Michelle Gellar (LaG)
- Cliff Gorman (MA)
- Adrian Grenier (LaG)
- Ben Harney (MA, 1970)
- Anna Maria Horsford (PA)
- David Iacono (LaG)
- Jharrel Jerome (LaG)
- Sean Kaufman (LaG)
- Yunjin Kim (PA)
- Zohra Lampert (MA)
- Dawnn Lewis (MA)
- Hal Linden (MA)
- Samantha Logan (LaG)
- Priscilla Lopez (PA)
- Janet Margolin (PA)
- Arlene Martel (PA)
- Matt McGorry (LaG)
- Lily McInerny (LaG)
- Esai Morales (PA)
- Julia Murney (LaG)
- Claudette Nevins
- Keith Nobbs (LaG)
- Ana Ortiz (LaG)
- Al Pacino (PA)
- Sarah Paulson (LaG)
- Elizabeth Peña (PA)
- Brock Peters (MA)
- Suzanne Pleshette (PA)
- Ving Rhames (PA)
- Tony Roberts (MA)
- Amy Ryan (PA)
- Jennifer Salt (PA)
- Helen Slater (PA, 1982)
- Wesley Snipes (PA)
- Corey Stoll (LaG)
- Susan Strasberg (PA, MA)
- Joy Sunday (LaG)
- Brian Tarantina
- Gina Torres (LaG)
- Lola Tung (LaG)
- Glynn Turman (PA)
- Christina Vidal (LaG)
- Jessica Walter (PA)
- Lesley Ann Warren (MA)
- Marlon Wayans (LaG, 1990)
- Steven Weber (PA)
- Billy Dee Williams (MA)

== Architects ==
- Charles Gwathmey (MA)

== Artists ==
- Amy Adler (MA, 1984)
- Ross Andru (MA, c. 1940)
- James Bama (MA)
- R. O. Blechman (MA)
- Frank Bolle (MA)
- Charles Bragg (MA)
- Robbie Conal (MA)
- Harvey Dinnerstein (MA)
- Byron Dobell (MA, 1944)
- Will Elder (MA)
- Mike Esposito (MA, c. 1940)
- Audrey Flack (MA)
- Mary Frank (MA)
- Milton Glaser (MA)
- Dave Gantz (MA, c. 1939)
- Laurence Gartel (MA)
- Grace Graupe-Pillard (MA)
- Ilana Halperin (PA)
- Dean Haspiel (LaG, 1985)
- Robin Holder (MA, 1969)
- Al Jaffee (MA)
- Wolf Kahn (MA)
- Maira Kalman (MA, 1967)
- Allan Kaprow (MA)
- Harvey Kurtzman (MA)
- George Lois (MA)
- Whitfield Lovell (MA)
- Emily Mason (MA, 1950)
- Frank Herbert Mason (MA)
- Josh Neufeld (LaG, 1985)
- Diane Noomin (MA)
- Reginald Pollack (MA)
- Nicolaia Rips
- Erika Rothenberg (MA, 1967)
- Reynold Ruffins (MA)
- Aaron Shikler (MA, 1940)
- Burton Silverman (MA)
- Steve Stiles (MA, c. 1960)
- Fred Wilson (MA)
- Jerome Witkin (MA)

== Classical instrumentalists ==
- Sanford Allen (MA)
- Ik-Hwan Bae (PA, 1976)
- Isidore Cohen (MA)
- Stanley Drucker (MA)
- Eugene Drucker
- Roy Eaton (MA, 1946)
- Timothy Eddy
- Béla Fleck (MA)
- Bernard Garfield (MA, 1942)
- Steven Lubin (MA)
- Murray Perahia (PA, 1963)
- Richie Ray (PA, 1962)
- Joshua Rifkin (MA, 1960)
- Marcus Thompson (MA)
- Andor Toth (MA, 1941)
- Roland Vamos (MA, 1948)
- Allan Vogel (MA)
- Arthur Weisberg (MA, 1948)
- Pinchas Zukerman (PA, 1967)

== Classical singers ==
- Patricia Brooks (MA)
- Gloria Davy (MA)
- Reri Grist (MA)
- Isabel Leonard (LaG, 2000)
- Catherine Malfitano (MA)
- Julia Migenes (MA, 1960)

== Composers ==
- Martin Bresnick (MA)
- Cy Coleman (MA)
- Robert Dick (MA, 1967)
- Morton Feldman (MA)
- Charles Fox (MA)
- Gerald Fried (MA, 1945)
- Joel Hirschhorn (PA)
- Michael Kamen (MA)
- Edward Kleban (MA)
- Meyer Kupferman (MA)
- Ezra Laderman (MA)
- Paul Lansky (MA)
- Ben Lanzarone (MA, 1956)
- Mitch Leigh (MA)
- Mathew Rosenblum (MA)
- Coleridge-Taylor Perkinson (MA)
- Seymour Shifrin (MA)
- Jonathan Tunick (PA)
- James Yannatos (MA)

== Conductors ==
- Leon Botstein (MA)
- James Conlon (MA)
- Paul Lustig Dunkel (MA)
- Leslie Dunner (MA, 1974)
- James Gaffigan (LaG)
- Eve Queler (MA, 1948)
- Gerard Schwarz (PA, 1965)
- Jonathan Strasser (MA, 1965)
- David Zinman (MA, 1953)

== Dancers/choreographers ==
- Camille A. Brown (PA)
- Jacqulyn Buglisi (PA)
- Gregg Burge (PA, 1975)
- Michael Callen
- Luis Camacho
- Christopher Chadman (PA)
- George de la Peña (PA)
- Louis Falco (PA)
- Eliot Feld (PA)
- Christian Holder (PA)
- William Isaac (LaG)
- Baayork Lee (PA)
- Bruce Marks (PA)
- Arthur Mitchell (PA)
- Tony Mordente (PA)
- Eleo Pomare (PA)
- Michael Peters (PA, 1965)
- Desmond Richardson (PA)
- Llanchie Stevenson (PA)
- Edward Villella (PA, 1954)
- Dudley Williams (PA, 1958))

== Designers ==
- Isaac Mizrahi
- Franklin Rowe
- Rus Yusupov

== Directors/writers ==
- Robert Brustein (MA)
- James Burrows (MA)
- Martin Charnin (MA)
- Matthew Diamond (PA)
- Kelman Duran (LaG)
- Rodman Flender (PA)
- David Hamilton Golland (LaG, 1989)
- Herb Gardner (PA)
- Peter Hyams (MA)
- Erica Jong (MA)
- Michael Kahn (PA)
- Jonathan Lethem (MA)
- Peter Manso (MA, 1957)
- Lynn Nottage (MA)
- Toby Orenstein (PA)
- Lonny Price (PA)
- Carl Hancock Rux (MA)
- Esmeralda Santiago (PA)
- Charles Van Doren (MA)
- Art Wolff (PA, 1955)

== Entertainers ==
- Awkwafina (LaG)
- Kelis (LaG)
- Tichina Arnold (LaG)
- Azealia Banks (LaG)
- Northern Calloway (PA, 1966)
- Diahann Carroll (MA)
- Michael Che (LaG, 2001)
- Eagle-Eye Cherry (PA, LaG)
- Lisa Fischer (MA)
- Jackée Harry (PA)
- Eartha Kitt (PA)
- Shari Lewis (MA)
- Melissa Manchester (PA)
- Nicki Minaj
- Liza Minnelli (PA)
- Peter Nero (MA)
- Laura Nyro (MA)
- Freddie Prinze (PA)
- Paul Stanley (MA, 1970)
- Elly Stone (MA)
- Suzanne Vega (PA, 1977)
- Ben Vereen (PA)
- Eric Weissberg (MA)
- Peter Yarrow (MA)

== Jazz musicians ==
- Nat Adderley, Jr.
- Don Byron
- Sterling Campbell (MA)
- Bill Charlap (PA, 1984)
- Ray Chew (LaG)
- Billy Cobham (MA, 1962)
- Eddie Daniels (PA, 1959)
- Charley Drayton (PA, 1980)
- Kenny Drew (MA)
- Sue Evans (MA)
- Sharon Freeman (MA, 1966)
- Bernie Glow (MA, 1943)
- Eddie Gómez (MA)
- Andy Gonzalez (MA)
- Omar Hakim (MA, 1977)
- Chuck Israels (PA, 1954)
- Steve Jordan (MA, 1974)
- Carolyn Leonhart (MA)
- Michael Leonhart (LaG)
- Jason Lindner (LaG)
- Marcus Miller
- Charnett Moffett (LaG)
- Jimmy Owens (MA)
- Noel Pointer (MA)
- Shorty Rogers (MA)
- Jeremy Steig (MA)
- Dave Valentin (MA)
- Kenny Washington (MA, 1976)
- Buddy Williams (MA, 1971)
- Larry Willis (MA, 1960)
- Bernard Wright (PA, 1980)

== Lyricists ==
- Carole Bayer Sager (MA)
- Marilyn Bergman (MA)

== Media ==
- Margot Adler (MA)
- Roberta Baskin (PA, 1969)
- Alexis Christoforous (LaG,1988)
- Janine Fondon (MFA, 2022)
- Max Frankel (MA, 1948)
- Bess Myerson (MA, 1941)
- Marcus Raskin (MA, 1951)
- Susan Stamberg (MA, 1955)

== Photographers ==
- Neal Slavin (MA, 1959)

== Producers ==
- Steven Bochco (MA, 1961)
- Sean Daniel (MA, 1969)
- Robert Greenwald (PA)
- Lynne Littman (MA, 1958)
- Daniel Melnick
- Stuart Ostrow (MA)
- Michael Pressman (MA, 1968)

== Singer/songwriters ==
- Steve Augeri (MA, freshman year only)
- Janis Ian (MA)
- Lara Raj (LaG)
- Nicki Minaj (LaG)
- Sombr (LaG)
- Natalie Gelman (LaG)
- Aaron Schroeder (MA)
- Whatmore (LaG)

== See also ==
- List of people from New York City
