= Barry Zaid =

Canadian illustrator

- Born: June 8, 1938 (age 88); Toronto, Ontario, Canada
- Education: University of Toronto
- Known for: Graphic design
- Awards: Society of Illustrators Gold Medal, 1974

Barry Zaid (born June 8, 1938) is a graphic artist and designer.

Zaid has contributed covers and drawings to numerous magazines and newspapers including Canadian publications The Globe and Mail, the Star Weekly, Chatelaine, Toronto Life and Maclean's; the Australian edition of Vogue; British magazines such as British Vogue, The Times, Queen, and The Sunday Times; the French Mademoiselle Age Tendre; and numerous American publications, including The New York Times, Time, Audience, TV Guide, Woman's Day, National Lampoon, Esquire, Sesame Street Magazine, New York magazine, Seventeen, McCalls, Highlights for Children, and Denver Magazine.

In addition, Zaid has designed several billboards for 7-Up, and hundreds of logos, including Miami Beach Sports, Upper Crust Sandwich Shop, The Dawg House, Florida Bay Mortgage, The Conch Farm, Chateau Le Chat, and The Market Company, and packaging for Kleenex tissues, Celestial Seasonings Herb Teas, Florence Gunnarson Perfumed Essentials, Captain Condom, Tropical Delicious, Tropic Lines (Jamaica), We Take The Cake, and Granny Bear Honey.

== Biography ==
=== Education ===
Born in Toronto, Ontario, Canada, Zaid studied English, Architecture and Archaeology at the University of Toronto (1957–1961). While a student, he designed posters for the Hart House Theatre and Neptune Theatre in Halifax, Nova Scotia and had a one man show of drawings and paintings at Toronto's Pollock Gallery in 1961.

=== Career ===
After graduating, he worked in a design studio (Rapier Arts Ltd.) in London, England and traveled throughout Europe (1961–1962). Following his return to Canada, he worked as a freelance graphic designer and illustrator and as a studio art director (Colopy Associates) in Toronto (1963–66). He then returned to London where he freelanced for two years, represented by Artist Partners Ltd. (1966–68), before joining the New York design consortium Push Pin Studios, (principals: Seymour Chwast and Milton Glaser) with whom he worked for six years (1969–75). His work appeared in the exhibition, 'The Push Pin Style' in the Museum of Decorative Arts of the Louvre, Paris, France, as well as numerous cities in Europe, Brazil and Japan (1970–72). In 1975, he traveled to Scotland, where he lived at the Findhorn Foundation commune, then lived in Bienne, Switzerland where he worked with Swiss ceramist, Lou Schmidt, Amsterdam, and Pondicherry, India where he designed the facade of a girls' school residence.

From 1979–87, he lived in Boulder, Colorado, where, as creative director, he created trendsetting packaging for Celestial Seasonings Herb Teas, posters for the Colorado Music Festival, and decorative hand crafted furniture for Bunnyville Studios Inc. He returned to Manhattan in (1987–92) where he pursued his career illustrating publications, wrote and designed a book "Wish You Were Here" (Crown Publishing). In 1992, he moved his studio to Miami Beach, Florida, where he produced graphics for The Miami Beach Chamber of Commerce, The Market Company and Proper Sausages, and decorative packaging for We Take The Cake and Florence Gunnarson Perfumed Essentials. In 2014, he traveled to San Miguel de Allende, Mexico, to develop a line of colorful housewares and complete his forthcoming illustrated children's book, "The Little Square ABC Of Things To Be."

=== Teaching ===
From 1976–68, Zaid taught at Virginia Commonwealth University in Richmond, Virginia. He has also taught at New York's School of Visual Arts and Parson's School of Design, the Rocky Mountain School of Art in Denver, Colorado, and The Miami Ad School in Miami Beach.

== Awards ==
Zaid's illustrated Chicken Little (New York, NY: Random House, 1973), was awarded a Gold Medal by the Society of Illustrators.

== Bibliography ==
As illustrator and/or designer:

- Rimes de la Mere Oie: Mother Goose Rhymes in French (Boston: Little, Brown & Co.1971) — co-illustrated with Seymour Chwast and Milton Glaser
- Chicken Little (New York, NY: Random House, 1973)
- The Chocolate Moose by Gwendolyn MacEwen (Toronto, Ontario: New Canadian Publications, 1981)
- Wish You Were Here: A Tour of America's Great Hotels During the Golden Age of the Picture Post Card (NY: Crown Publishers,1990) — writer and designer
- Toyland by Pamela Prince (New York, NY: Harmony Books, 1990)
- Jenifer Lang Cooks for Kids by Jenifer Lang (New York, NY: Harmony Books, 1991)
- Enola Prudhomme's Low-Calorie Cajun Cooking (New York, NY: Hearst Books, 1991)
- South Beach Style (NY: Harry N. Abrams, 2002)

Cover designer:

- Art Deco by Bevis Hillier (Studio Vista/Dutton, 1968)
- No Nudes is Good Nudes by P.G. Wodehouse (New York, NY: Simon & Schuster, 1970)
- My Revolution: Promenades in Paris 1789–1794, Being The Diary of Restif de la Bretonne by Alex Karmel (New York, NY: McGraw-Hill, 1970)
- The First to Fly: Aviation's Pioneer Days (New York, NY: Macmillan, 1970)
- Arrive at Easterwine by R.A. Lafferty (New York, NY: Charles Scribner's Sons, 1971)
- Patience & Sarah by Isabel Miller (NY: McGraw-Hill, 1972)
- Sandmouth by Ronald Frame (New York, NY: Alfred A. Knopf, 1988)
- The Past is Another Country (New York, NY: Simon & Schuster, 1988)
