= Paul Degen =

Swiss artist (1941–2007)

- Born: 24 March 1941; Basel, Switzerland
- Died: 30 May 2007 (aged 66); Basel, Switzerland
- Education: Kunstschule Basel; Académie Julian
- Known for: Illustration, Caricature, Painting, Sculpture
- Awards: Basel Innovation Prize, 1992

Paul Degen (24 March 1941 – 30 May 2007) was a Swiss illustrator, caricaturist, painter and sculptor. He is mostly known for the cartoons he did for The New York Times and his 34 title illustrations for The New Yorker magazine in the 1970s and 1980s. In 1992 he was awarded the Basel Innovation Prize for inventing the "ROMA birth wheel."

== Biography ==
=== Early life and education ===
Paul Degen was born on 24 March 1941 in Basel, Switzerland. After his education as a lithographor at the Wassermann Ag in Basel and graduation from the Kunstschule Basel (Basel College of Commercial Art), Degen continued his education at the graphic design studio of Theo Ballmer and at the Académie Julian in Paris.

=== Career ===
In the 1960s Degen worked as a freelance graphic designer and illustrator with Herbert Leupin, Celestino Piatti, and Fritz Bühler at the Atelier Eidenbenz in Switzerland.

In 1970 Degen moved to New York and worked, besides freelancing as a cartoonist and illustrator for The New York Times, Esquire, Harper's Magazine and The Atlantic Monthly, at the Push Pin Studios with Milton Glaser and Seymour Chwast.

After living in Brazil, Peru, Hawaii, Bali, and his return to New York at the end of 1988, Degen moved back to Liestal near Basel in 1990.

==== ROMA Birth Wheel ====
In the mid-1980s, while hospitalized for a spinal disc herniation, Degan suffered from chronic constipation and the helplessness of being forced to lie on his back. Obsessing about the desire to be upright and hold onto something, he realized that women in labor must have the same desires. While still bedridden, Degan produced initial drawings which six years later led to the first ROMA Birth Wheel. The device allows women in labor to achieve an upright, natural position for delivery of the child.

=== Death ===
Paul Degen died on 30 May 2007, in Basel following an operation.

== Exhibitions ==
- Architecture for Children (1000 boxes), Hudson River Museum, New York
- 34 American Architects Travelling Exhibit - Rome, Venice, Milan, Bologna and the United States
- 1979 - Gallerie Commercio, Zurich
- 1979/81 - Hotel Engel, Liestal
- 1981 - Susumo Gallery, Sydney
- 1985 - Hotel Engel, Liestal
- 2006 - HP-GARCIA Gallery, Hell's Kitchen/ New York

== Book illustrations ==
- The Emperor's New Clothes, Hans Christian Andersen, Random House (1978), ISBN 0-394-83840-8
- O Thou Improper Thou Uncommun Noun, Clarkson N Potter Inc, NY (1978), ISBN 0-517-53511-4
- David Copperfield, Charles Dickens, Franklin Library (1980), ASIN: B000BWRFP0
- Die Abenteuer der 3 T Buch:Ingrid Tschan, Illustrationen: Paul Degen ISBN 978-3-033-01215-8
