= Ballmer =

Ballmer is a surname. Notable people with the surname include:

- Karl Ballmer (1891–1958), Swiss painter, anthroposophical philosopher, and writer
- Steve Ballmer (born 1956), American businessman who formerly served as the chief executive officer of Microsoft
- Théo Ballmer (1902–1965) Swiss graphic designer, photographer, and professor

== See also ==
- Balmer (surname)
