= 207 East 32nd Street =

Historic building in Manhattan, New York

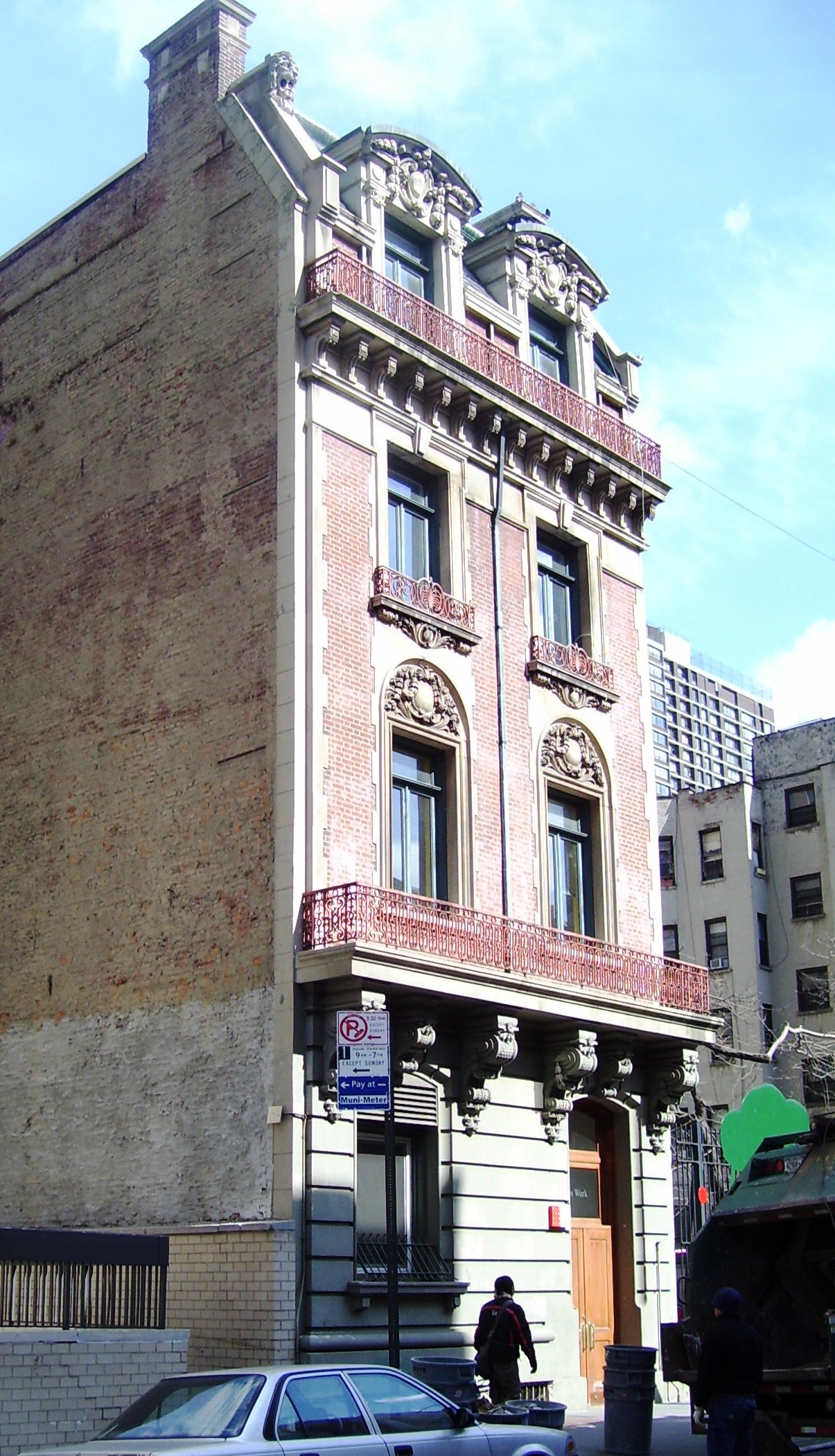
- The building's facade in 2011

General information
- Architectural style: Beaux Arts
- Location: 207 East 32nd Street; Manhattan, New York, US
- Coordinates: 40°44′40″N 73°58′42″W
- Completed: 1902
- Cost: US$40,000

Technical details
- Floor count: 4
- Floor area: 9,000 sq ft (840 m^{2})

Design and construction
- Architect: Robert T. Lyons

207 East 32nd Street is a historic building located between Second and Third avenues in the Kips Bay neighborhood of Manhattan in New York City. Designed by architect Robert T. Lyons, the building was completed in 1902 as a clubhouse for the Tammany Central Association, replacing the organization's former building that had occupied the site. It was subsequently used as a municipal courthouse from 1911 to 1939 and converted into offices by the 1950s.

The building was purchased in 1965 by graphic designers Milton Glaser and Seymour Chwast, who moved their firm Push Pin Studios to the site. The building served as the headquarters of New York magazine from the publication's founding in 1968 until 1974. Ms. magazine also began at this location in 1971. Glaser continued to use the building as his studio until 2019. The property was purchased in 2020 by The New York Review of Books; the magazine moved its office into the building in the fall of 2023.

== History ==
The building was originally completed in 1902 as a clubhouse for the Tammany Central Association to serve as a replacement for its former house located at 207 East 32nd Street. Headed by Richard Croker, the Tammany Central Association was one of the local districts of the Tammany Hall political organization. Plans for a new four-story building on the site were filed on June 12, 1901. The new structure was built on a land lot with a frontage of 24.7 feet (7.5 m) and a depth of 98.9 feet (30.1 m) at a cost of $40,000.

Once considered to be "the strongest district in Tammany", the Tammany Central Association began to lose its influence after the establishment of the nearby Civic Club and ran into financial troubles following a loss of members, taking out a mortgage on the property. The organization decided to move to another location and leased its building to the city beginning in 1911, which used the site for the Fourth District Municipal Court. That same year, the Tammany Central Association purchased 226 East 32nd Street to serve as its clubhouse, which was a four-story building located on the same block. 207 East 32nd Street continued to be rented by the city from the Tammany Central Association until 1939, when the city ended its lease and moved the courthouse to 325 East 38th Street. Ownership of the property was taken by the Emigrant Savings Bank following a foreclosure auction in May 1940. The bank sold the property to Nelson A. Miller later that year.

By the 1950s, 207 East 32nd Street had been converted into offices. Architect Marcia Mead moved her office into the building in 1952. In 1965, Milton Glaser and Seymour Chwast purchased 207 East 32nd Street and moved their firm Push Pin Studios into the building. Along with Clay Felker, Glaser founded New York magazine at the site in 1968; the magazine remained at the location until 1974. Ms. magazine also started publication at the building in 1971 as an insert to New York magazine. Glaser left Push Pin Studios in 1974 and formed Milton Glaser Inc., which operated out of the building until 2019.

In 2017, the block that the building is located on was renamed "Ms. Magazine Way" in honor of the location where the publication was launched and a new street sign was erected at the southeast corner of Third Avenue and East 32nd Street. A dedication ceremony for the street renaming was held on November 15, 2017, and attended by Gloria Steinem, a co-founder of Ms. magazine, along with Rosie Méndez, the local City Councilwoman who sponsored the legislation to rename the street.

Glaser decided to list the building for sale in 2019 as he approached his 90th birthday and his health was deteriorating. The 9,000-square-foot (840 m^{2}) building was sold for $7.5 million in 2020 to The New York Review of Books. The magazine moved its office into the building in the fall of 2023.

In 2025, the Historic Districts Council, in partnership with the Rose Hill/Kips Bay Coalition, requested the New York City Landmarks Preservation Commission evaluate the building for potential designation as an individual landmark.

== Architecture ==
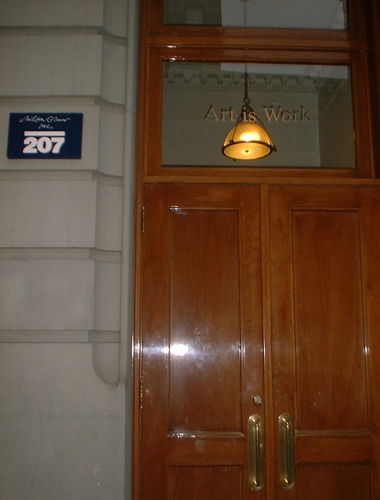
The front entrance to Glaser's studio in 2003

The house was designed in the Beaux Arts style by architect Robert T. Lyons. The building's decorative façade consists of red brick and limestone with two ornamental balconies and a mansard roof, which Christopher Gray of The New York Times described as being "showy for 32nd Street east of the Third Avenue El" and "worthy of any lot on Fifth Avenue". The front entrance to the building originally contained a stoop; the entrance was later modified to include a transom window with the motto "Art is Work" etched in the glass.

Lyons' design for the Tammany Central Association's clubhouse included a foyer hallway and a grand staircase along with a meeting room containing an elevated platform. The second floor consisted of a library, card rooms and lounges; the third floor contained committee and billiard rooms; the top floor included the superintendent's apartment, a gymnasium, and a shower room. Additional recreational space for bowling and shuffleboard was provided in the basement. Marble hallways and mosaic tile floors were used in building's flooring. According to The Sun, the building "was one of the best equipped political club houses in the city" and had "all the necessary conveniences for club life."
