= Balmer =

Balmer may refer to:

- Balmer (crater), lava-flooded remains of a lunar crater
- Balmer (surname)
- the Balmer series of spectral lines
