= High School of Music & Art =

Former specialized high school in Manhattan, New York

Coordinates: 40.818379°N 73.95005°W

The High School of Music & Art

Location
- 443-465 West 135th Street; New York, New York; United States

Information
- Type: Public specialized school High school
- Established: 1936
- Founder: Fiorello H. LaGuardia
- Closed: 1984
- Principal: Richard A. Klein (1969–1987)
- Grades: 9–12
- Campus: urban
- Colors: burgundy & light blue
- Nickname: M&A
- Merged with: High School of Performing Arts
- To form: Fiorello H. LaGuardia High School of Music & the Arts
- Website: alumniandfriends.org

The High School of Music & Art (informally known as Music & Art or M&A) was a public specialized high school located at 443-465 West 135th Street in Manhattan, New York, from 1936 until 1984. In 1961, Music & Art and the High School of Performing Arts (est. 1947) were formed into a two-campus high school. The schools fully merged in 1984 into the Fiorello H. LaGuardia High School of Music & the Arts.

Colloquially known as "The Castle on the Hill," the building which once housed Music & Art is located in the Hamilton Heights neighborhood of Harlem, in the campus of the City College of New York across the street from St. Nicholas Park. The building now houses the A. Philip Randolph Campus High School, a magnet school of the New York City Department of Education.

== History ==
New York City Mayor Fiorello H. LaGuardia started the high school in 1936, an event he described as "the most hopeful accomplishment" of his administration. As the mayor of New York City he wanted to establish a public school in which students could hone their talents in music, art and the performing arts. Music & Art was made up of three departments: Art, Instrumental Music, and Vocal Music. It was a magnet school, meant to draw talented students from all boroughs. In 1948, a sister school–the High School of Performing Arts–was created in an effort to harness students' talents in dance.

Future Mad magazine contributors Al Jaffee, Will Elder, Harvey Kurtzman, John Severin, and Al Feldstein all attended Music & Art together in the 1930s. Comic book artists Ross Andru and Mike Esposito, did as well, although they were slightly younger than Jaffee and the others.

R. O. Blechman, Milton Glaser, Ed Sorel, and Reynold Ruffins–three of the four co-founders of the design firm Push Pin Studios–were M&A students in the 1940s. Other M&A graduates from the 1940s include Bess Myerson, Allan Kaprow, and Hal Linden. Notable graduates from the 1950s include Gloria Davy, Diahann Carroll, Susan Stamberg, Jonathan Tunick, Billy Dee Williams, Peter Yarrow, Tony Roberts, James Burrows, Erica Jong, Felix Pappalardi, Joanna Frank, and Jeremy J. Shapiro.

Notable M&A graduates from the 1960s include Peter Hyams, Steven Bochco, Robbie Conal, Graham Diamond, Maira Kalman, Bob Mankoff, Diane Noomin, and Margot Adler; while notable graduates from the 1970s include musicians Paul Stanley and Kenny Washington. Notable M&A grads from the 1980s include writers Jonathan Lethem and Lynn Nottage, and hip-hop musicians Slick Rick.

=== Merger with Performing Arts ===
As per Mayor LaGuardia's vision, Music & Art and Performing Arts merged on paper in 1961 and were to be combined in one building. However, this took many years and it was not until 1984 that the sister schools were merged into a new school, the Fiorello H. LaGuardia High School of Music & Art and Performing Arts, at a new building designed by Eduardo Catalano in the Lincoln Square area of Manhattan. The Board of Education posthumously honored Mayor LaGuardia by naming the new building after him.

== Architectural significance ==
The 1924 Gothic Revival building was designed by William H. Gompert, Architect & Superintendent of School Buildings for the New York City Board of Education, to house the New York Training School for Teachers. The Training School became the New York Teachers Training College from 1931 to 1933. That school was abolished during the Depression when there was a surplus of teachers for the city's school system, and Mayor LaGuardia used the opportunity to create the High School of Music & Art.

Architecturally, the building blends in with the older gothic revival buildings of the City College campus, designed by architect George B. Post around 1900 to create a setting that came to be known as "the poor man's Harvard."

Music & Art students and graduates often referred to the building as "The Castle on the hill," a reference to the design of its gothic towers, and the decorative gargoyles done in a quirky and playful style that the Landmarks Commission report describes as "finials in the shape of creatures bearing shields." The tower rooms have dramatic acoustics, which Music & Art used as choral practice rooms. The large gymnasium features large Tudor-arch-shaped windows on two sides that at certain times during the day stream sunlight into the room. The auditorium has excellent acoustics, and features diamond-shaped amber windows that during daylight cast a warm glow on its dark wood interior. The iron ends of the auditorium seats have a casting with an image of the Tudor window arches in the gymnasium.

The building won status as a landmark by the New York City Landmarks Preservation Commission in 1997. According to the Landmark Commission report, this was not an expensive building for its time, and many of the structural components (like the staircase bracings in the stairwell) were left exposed to save money. Yet much thought went into humanizing the space and creating a good environment for learning, with plenty of natural light and air, expansive collaborative spaces, and much playful decoration thrown in for good measure:

The five- and six-story (plus basement and central tower) L-shaped [building] was designed in an abstracted contemporary Collegiate Gothic style and clad in limestone and mottled buff-to brown iron-spot brick, with large window bays filled with unusual folding-casement steel sash windows. Exterior articulation, divided vertically by pavilions, buttresses, and square towers, also differentiated the model school and training school portions, as well as a "churchlike" wing housing an auditorium, above which is a gymnasium.

== Notable alumni ==
Note: students who graduated after 1984 are considered graduates of Fiorello H. LaGuardia High School, not Music & Art.

- Margot Adler (1964), radio journalist
- Ross Andru (c. 1940), comic book artist
- Eleanor Antin (1952), artist
- Louis Abolafia (1958), artist, presidential candidate, and countercultural figure
- Stanley Aronowitz, academic and activist
- Ray Billingsley (c. 1974) – cartoonist, creator of the syndicated comic strip Curtis
- R. O. Blechman (c. 1948), animator, illustrator, children's-book author, and cartoonist
- Steven Bochco (1961), TV producer & writer
- Frank Bolle, cartoonist
- Leon Botstein (1963), conductor and President of Bard College
- Nancy Brooks Brody (1980), artist
- Steven Brower (1970), designer and author
- James Burrows (1958), director
- Harriet Camen (1946), ceramics artist
- Diahann Carroll (1953), singer
- Jerome Charyn (1955), novelist
- Kvitka Cisyk (1970), singer
- Billy Cobham (1962), jazz drummer
- Gil Coggins, jazz pianist and composer
- Sal Cuevas (1972), bassist
- Kenny Drew, jazz pianist
- Robbie Conal (1961), artist
- Gloria Davy (1951), operatic soprano
- Gemze de Lappe (1939), dancer
- Graham Diamond (1963), speculative fiction writer
- Will Elder (1940), cartoonist
- Alvin Epstein (1943), actor and director
- Mike Esposito (c. 1940), comic book artist
- Morton Feldman, composer
- Al Feldstein, cartoonist and editor
- Audrey Flack, painter and sculptor
- Bela Fleck (1976) banjo player
- Charles Fox (1958) composer
- Dennis Francis (c. 1974), comic book artist and illustrator
- Joanna Frank, actress
- Peter Freeman, multi-instrumentalist, bassist and music composer
- Gerald Fried, composer, conductor, and oboist
- Dave Gantz (c. 1939), cartoonist
- Lenora Garfinkel (1930–2020), architect
- Milton Glaser (1947), designer
- Bernie Glow (1942), trumpet player
- Johnny Dorelli (1937), singer, actor, pianist
- Andy González (1968), bassist
- Jerry González (1967), bandleader, trumpeter
- Christopher Guest (~1966), screenwriter, actor, director, composer
- Charles Gwathmey (1956), architect
- Larry Harlow (musician) (1957), pianist, composer
- Peter Hyams (1960), director
- Janis Ian
- Chris Iijima, activist, lawyer and member of Yellow Pearl
- Al Jaffee (1940), cartoonist
- Erica Jong (1959), author
- Maira Kalman (1967), illustrator, writer, artist, and designer
- Michael Kamen (1965), composer
- Susan Kamil, book editor and publisher
- Allan Kaprow (1945), painter and performance artist
- Amy A. Kass, educator and anthologist
- Everett Raymond Kinstler, artist, portrait painter
- James Howard Kunstler (1966), author, social critic
- Harvey Kurtzman (1941), cartoonist, creator of Mad Magazine
- Paul Lansky (1961), composer
- Michael Lax (1947), industrial designer
- Jonathan Lethem (1982), author
- Shari Lewis (née Sonia Phyllis Hurwitz) (c. 1951) actress, puppeteer
- Hal Linden (1948), actor
- Bob Mankoff (1962), cartoonist and long-time The New Yorker magazine cartoon editor
- Ray Marcano, medical reporter and music critic
- Barbara Mendes (1966), underground cartoonist and painter
- William A. Moses, real estate developer
- Bess Myerson (1941), actress and politician
- Diane Noomin (c. 1964), cartoonist
- Lynn Nottage (1982), playwright
- Laura Nyro (née Nigro), (1965), singer/songwriter
- Frank J. Oteri (1981), composer and music journalist
- Frank Owens, pianist, arranger, composer, and conductor
- Brock Peters, actor
- Margaret Ponce Israel, painter and ceramist
- Nancy B. Reich musicologist
- Slick Rick (1983), hip-hop musician
- Joshua Rifkin (1961), conductor and musicologist
- Tony Roberts (1957), actor
- Julie Robinson Belafonte, dancer and actress
- Arlen Roth (1969) Guitarist, author, singer
- Reynold Ruffins (1948), designer
- Sandi Russell, jazz singer and writer
- Bernard Safran (1939), illustrator, artist
- Ed Seeman cartoonist, cinematographer, photographer, abstract artist, movie director
- John Severin (1940), cartoonist
- Jeremy J. Shapiro (1957), critical theorist
- Joel Shatzky (c. 1960), writer and literary professor
- Mark Snow (1964), composer
- Ed Sorel (c. 1947), illustrator and cartoonist
- Eulalie Spence (1894–1981), writer, teacher, director, actress and playwright
- Susan Stamberg (1955), radio journalist
- Paul Stanley (1970), musician
- Jeremy Steig (1960), improvising flutist
- Daniel Stern (1946), writer, musician
- Steve Stiles (c. 1960), cartoonist
- Susan Strasberg (1956), actress
- Beth Ames Swartz, artist
- Allen Swift (1924–2010), actor, writer and magician, best known as a voiceover artist who voiced characters Simon Bar Sinister and Riff-Raff on the Underdog cartoon show
- Richard Taruskin (1961), music historian
- Jonathan Tunick (1954), composer and orchestrator, EGOT recipient
- Dave Valentin (1969), Latin jazz flutist
- Charles Van Doren, writer and editor
- Daniel Waitzman (1961), flutist and composer
- Kenny Washington (1976), jazz musician
- Billy Dee Williams (1955), actor
- Peter Yarrow (1955), singer/songwriter
- Sherman Yellen (1949), playwright, memoirist
- Marian Zazeela (1956), artist, musician, performer
- Kristi Zea (1966), production designer
