= Karl Ballmer =

Swiss painter, anthroposophical philosopher and writer

- Born: 23 February 1891; Aarau, Switzerland
- Died: 7 September 1958 (aged 67); Lugano, Switzerland
- Known for: Painting

Karl Ballmer (23 February 1891 – 7 September 1958) was a Swiss painter, anthroposophical philosopher, and writer.

== Life ==
In 1918, he met Rudolf Steiner. In 1922 he settled in Hamburg. After studying anthroposophy as autodidact for seven years, he tried to bring Rudolf Steiner into the discussions of the scientific world. In 1928, he published the Rudolf Steiner-Blätter for those who wanted to comprehend the so-called Rudolf Steiner Event. In 1935, an exhibition was organized for him by Hildebrand Gurlitt, who would later be tasked with selling degenerate art on the international market. In 1936, he was prohibited from painting by the Nazi Government.

In 1938, together with his friend, Edith van Cleef, he leaves Hamburg, Germany and moves back to Switzerland. In Lamone near Lugano he lives painting and writing for the remaining 20 years in almost total solitude. He writes about physics, philosophy, and theology – as anthroposophy. In his writings he targets fundamentals without compromises; he possesses huge natural scientific and spiritual scientific knowledge, thus the level of his publications was mostly very high. His acquaintance with Gurlitt later enabled him to facilitate the sale of several paintings of degenerate art to the Kunstmuseum Basel.

In studying his works readers can experience sensitive self-encounters, (sadly) often without further consequences (in their own development). Ballmer, similar to Steiner, could be himself seen as an "Event" in development of mankind – as confrontation with the world process, of which he takes part.

Karl Ballmer's research in cognitive science and the evolution of the human self-awareness was influenced mainly by two books, 1) Rudolf Steiner's "Occult Science" (1909) and 2) Louis-Claude de Saint-Martin's "Irrthümer und Wahrheit, oder Rückweiß für die Menschen auf das allgemeine Principium aller Erkenntniß" (1782). (See quote from Karl Ballmer's "Deutsche Physik — von einem Schweizer" in the latter.)

== Works ==
- Rudolf Steiner und die jüngste Philosophie, Hamburg 1928
- Ernst Haeckel und Rudolf Steiner, Hamburg 1929
- Das Goetheanum Rudolf Steiners, in: Bau-Rundschau, Hamburg 1930
- Aber Herr Heidegger! Zur Freiburger Rektoratsrede Martin Heideggers. Foreword by Fritz Eymann, Basel 1933
- Der Macher bin ich, den Schöpfer empfange ich, 1933
- Rembrandt oder die Tragödie des Lichtes, 1933
- A. E. Biedermann heute! Zur theologischen Aufrüstung, Bern 1941
- Das Christentum der Berner Universität, Aarau 1941
- Ein Schweizerischer Staatsrechtler: Karl Barth, Melide 1941
- Elf Briefe über Wiederverkörperung, Besazio 1953
- Briefwechsel über die motorischen Nerven, Besazio 1953
- Editorin Marie Steiner, Besazio 1954
- Philologin Marie Steiner, Besazio 1954
- Die erste Mitteilung über soziale Dreigliederung, Besazio 1957

Posthumous:

- Die Rolle der Persönlichkeit im Weltgeschehen, Besazio 1964
- Deutschtum und Christentum in der Theosophie des Goetheanismus, Besazio 1966
- Troxlers Auferstehung, Besazio 1966
- Die Judenfrage, Besazio 1975
- Die Zukunft des deutschen Idealismus, Besazio 1975
- „Wissenschaft“, Besazio 1976
- Erlösung der Tiere durch Eurythmie. Zu Rudolf Steiners „Eurythmie“, Besazio 1976
- Die Aktie, Symbol der Schande, Besazio 1976
- Rudolf Steiners Philosophie der Freiheit als Analyse des Christusbewusstseins, Besazio 1979
- Von der Natur zur Schöpfung. Thomismus und Goetheanismus, Besazio 1979
- Anthroposophie und Christengemeinschaft, Besazio 1980
  - Siegen 1995, ISBN 3-930964-52-X
- Abschied vom „Leib-Seele-Problem“, Siegen 1994, ISBN 3-930964-21-X
- Die moderne Physik, ein philosophischer Wert?, Siegen 1994, ISBN 3-930964-20-1
- Synchronizität. Gleichzeitigkeit, Akausalität und „Schöpfung aus dem Nichts“ bei C. G. Jung und Rudolf Steiner, Siegen 1995, ISBN 3-930964-25-2
- Das Ereignis Rudolf Steiner, Siegen 1995, ISBN 3-930964-51-1
- Max Stirner und Rudolf Steiner. Vier Aufsätze, Siegen 1995, ISBN 3-930964-24-4
- Deutsche Physik – von einem Schweizer, Siegen 1995, ISBN 3-930964-50-3
- Anknüpfend an eine Bemerkung über James Joyce, Siegen 1996, ISBN 3-930964-23-6
- Die Überwindung des Theismus als Gegenwartsaufgabe, Siegen 1996, ISBN 3-930964-53-8
- Umrisse einer Christologie der Geisteswissenschaft. Texte und Briefe, hg. v. Karen Swassjan. Verlag am Goetheanum, Dornach 1999, ISBN 3-7235-1072-8
- Ehrung – des Philosophen Herman Schmalenbach, Siegen 2006, ISBN 3-930964-56-2
- Briefwechsel über die motorischen Nerven — Erweiterte Neuausgabe, www.edition-lgc.de, 2013
