= Lenora Garfinkel =

American architect (1930–2020)

Lenora Garfinkel (12 Apr 1930 – 29 Apr 2020) was an American architect, specializing in the design and construction of Jewish ritual buildings.

== Childhood and education ==
Born Lenora Fay Josephy on April 12, 1930, in the Bronx, Garfinkel attended the High School of Music & Art in Manhattan and was among the first women to enroll in Cooper Union’s architecture program in the class of 1950. She took the Cooper Union entrance exam on a Sunday instead of Saturday, the Jewish Sabbath; she tested under a pseudonym to increase her chances of admission.

== Career ==
Garfinkel maintained an architecture office in Monsey, New York, for more than 50 years. The business was ranked in the top 8% of New York licensed contractors.

She designed the Atrium, an Ultra-Orthodox events space in Monsey, the Viznitz Synagogue, and the Masores Bais Yaakov school in Brooklyn. She became an authority on the religious regulations and design specifications for Jewish ritual institutions, including mikvahs and synagogues.

== Personal ==
She was married to Sam Garfinkel, a pharmacist, in 1958. The couple had five children, 20 grandchildren, and over 50 great-grandchildren. Two of her sons are also architects.

Garfinkel died in April 2020, from COVID-19 in The Bronx during the COVID-19 pandemic in New York City. Her son and grandson died from the virus within a week of her death.
