= 325 East 38th Street =

Commercial building in Manhattan, New York

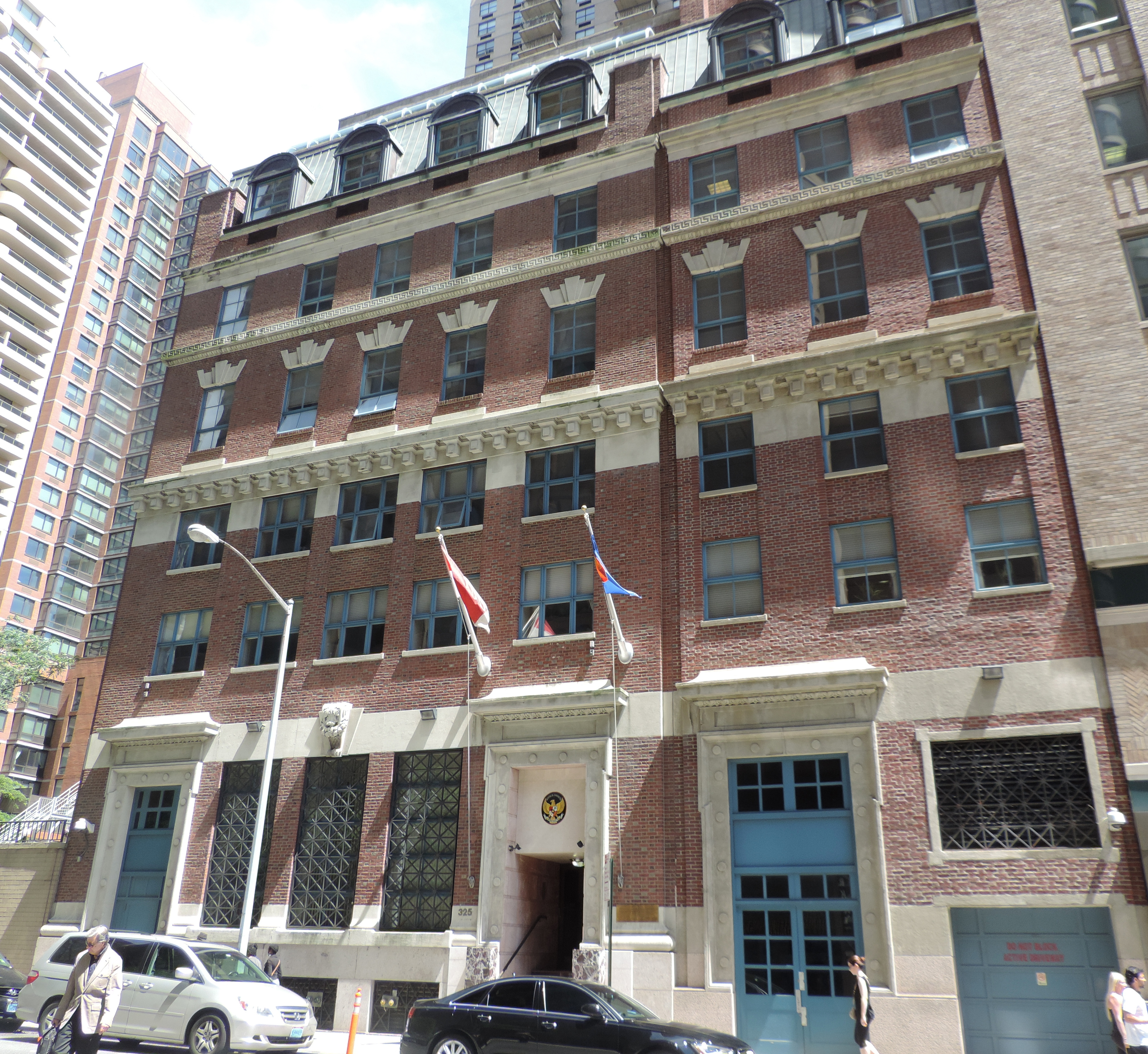
- The building in 2016, shown as the Permanent Mission of Indonesia to the United Nations
- Interactive map of the 325 East 38th Street area

General information
- Status: Completed
- Location: New York City, United States
- Coordinates: 40°44′49″N 73°58′21″W
- Opened: 1904
- Renovated: 1914, 1919, 1926, 1969–1970, 1999–2000

Technical details
- Floor count: 7
- Floor area: 44,000 sq ft (4,100 m^{2})

Design and construction
- Architect: Charles A. Rich
- Main contractor: Andrew J. Robinson Company

Renovating team
- Architects: Renwick, Aspinwall & Guard (1926); Stephen B. Jacobs (1999–2000)

325 East 38th Street is a seven-story commercial building located between First and Second avenues in the Murray Hill neighborhood of Manhattan in New York City. The building originally opened in 1904 as public baths and was subsequently renovated and expanded, later housing other entities including a wet wash laundry, medical centers, and a nursing school. It currently serves as the permanent mission for Indonesia to the United Nations.

== History ==
=== Opening and early years ===
In 1902, it was announced that the philanthropist Elizabeth Milbank Anderson had purchased a plot of land measuring 50 by 98.9 feet (15.2 by 30.1 m) at 225 to 227 East 38th Street that would be used for the construction of public baths to be donated to the Association for Improving the Condition of the Poor (AICP). Plans for the new structure were designed by architect Charles A. Rich. Rich had previously designed other projects for the Anderson family in New York City, including Milbank Hall at Barnard College and Bryant Park Studios. The site of the new building on East 38th Street was previously occupied by two-story brick tenements with one- and two-story frame buildings at the rear of the lots.

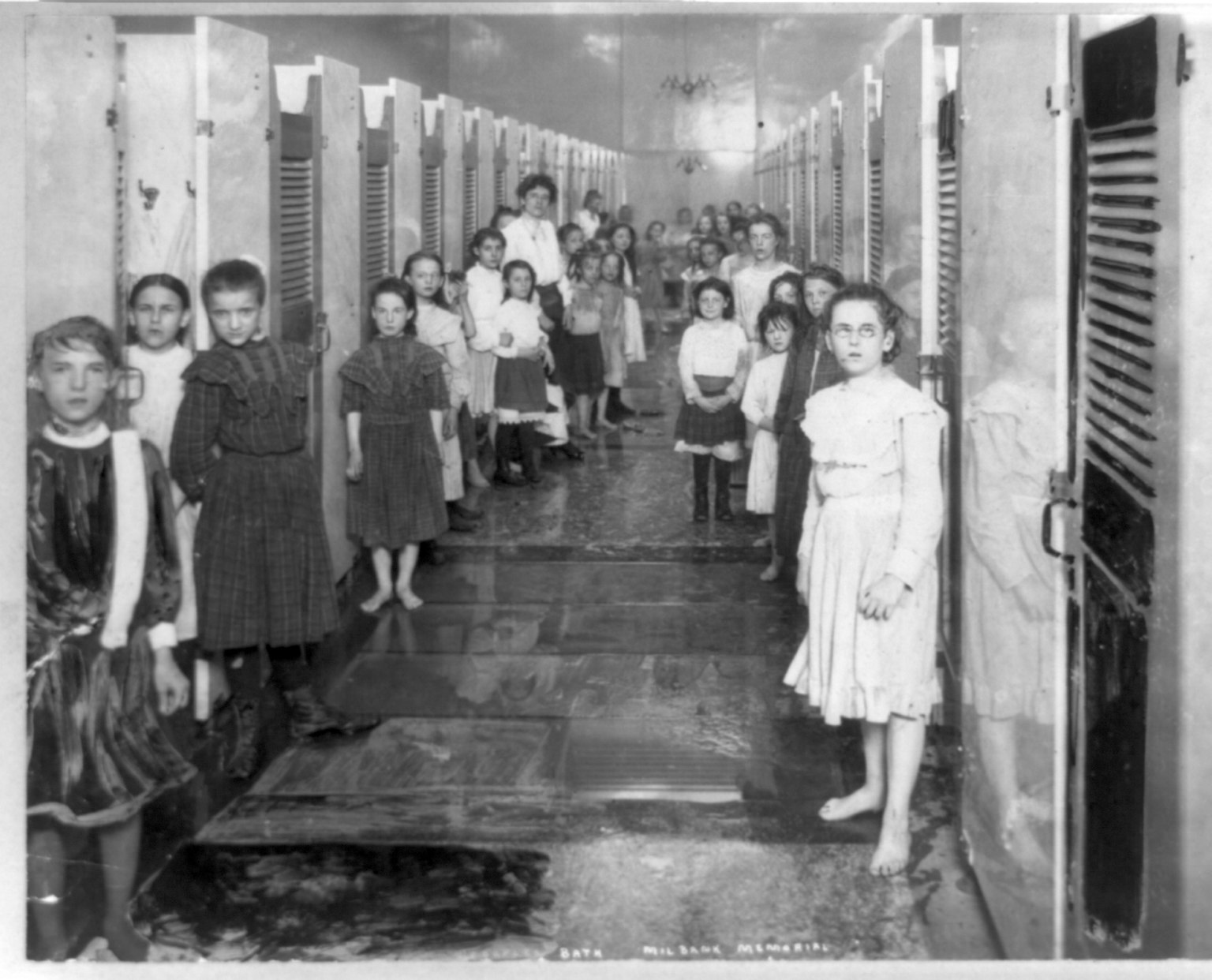
Milbank Memorial Baths in 1908

The public baths, named the Milbank Memorial Baths in memory of Elizabeth's father, were opened to the public on May 19, 1904. At the time of the building's completion, it was estimated that there was a total of 50,000 people living in the area that did not have access to bathing facilities in their own homes. The new bath house had a total of 59 shower baths and 3 tub baths for men and 26 shower baths and 6 tub baths for women; it had an overall capacity of 4,800 people per day. Admission to the baths was free for those who brought their own towel and soap; an admission fee of five cents was charged for bathers who needed soap and towels. The front of the three-story building, which had a brick façade with limestone trimming, had separate entrances for men and women. The first floor had an office and separate bathing facilities for men and women, the second floor contained men's baths, and the third floor contained a residence for the superintendent. The interior of the building was finished with Italian marble and tile and included maple and oak woodwork.

After the AICP's Bureau of Public Health and Hygiene conducted a study on the availability of commercial laundry facilities in the area near the bath house, it was decided to repurpose the second floor of the building into a model wet wash laundry, which opened on November 16, 1914. The facility contained a single eight-compartment washing machine and four hydroextractors, having a capacity of 500 bundles of laundry per week. The public was charged a fee of 25 cents to have a 30-pound (14 kg) bundle of laundry washed if they dropped it off and picked it up, or 50 cents if they had the bundle picked up and delivered by wagon. In addition to providing a beneficial service to the local community, the model wet wash laundry was used as a laboratory to test different methods of laundry sanitation. It was determined that the use of hot water at 90 °C (194 °F) alone was sufficient in killing bacteria compared to using soap or bleach. The remaining baths on the first floor of the building were removed in 1919, when the entire facility was converted into a wet wash laundry. The building operated as a laundry facility until 1925.

=== Other uses ===
The property was acquired from the AICP by the Milbank Memorial Fund, which renovated the building and expanded it to five floors to serve as a model health center with clinics for dentistry, infant welfare, social hygiene, and tuberculosis. The site had been selected to serve as the headquarters for the Milbank Memorial Fund's metropolitan health demonstration, which was conducted in the Bellevue-Yorkville district covering the area on the east side of Manhattan from East 14th to 64th streets, running from Fourth Avenue to the East River. The vacant lot on the east side of the building (No. 329) was also purchased by the fund to ensure an adequate supply of light and air around the structure. It opened as the Bellevue-Yorkville Health Building on November 30, 1926. The ground floor included a lobby and auditorium, and the remainder of space on this floor and the second floor were occupied by medical clinics operated by the New York City Department of Health. The third and fourth floors contained administrative offices for the health demonstration project and district offices for some of the cooperating agencies, including the AICP, Charity Organization Society, Henry Street Visiting Nurse Association, and Kips Bay Neighborhood Association. An assembly room was located on the fifth floor.

In May 1939, following the completion of the Bellevue-Yorkville health demonstration, the Fourth District Municipal Court moved into a portion of the building from a site the city had been leasing at 207 East 32nd Street. At that time, part of 325 East 38th Street was occupied by a new district emergency relief unit that had been established by the city's Department of Welfare. The building later served as the interim location of the Institute of Rehabilitation and Physical Medicine, which opened on June 17, 1948, and was directed by Howard A. Rusk. The institute remained at the location until January 1951, when its new facility opened at First Avenue and East 34th Street, the first building to be completed in the development of the New York University-Bellevue Medical Center. In 1954, the building was leased by the Chiropractic Institute of New York, which occupied the site until the institute closed in 1968 and merged with the National College of Chiropractic in Illinois.

In 1969, Skidmore College announced that it had leased the building to house its Irene Ward McClellan Department of Nursing, which was previously located in Fahnestock Hall at 304 East 20th Street. The interior of the building was remodeled to include the addition of a mezzanine floor and was designed to accommodate residences for 86 students in their sophomore and junior years. Students began occupying the renovated building in November 1970. The college purchased the building a few years later with financing from the United States Department of Housing and Urban Development, but decided in 1982 to close its nursing program due to declining enrollment. The college sold the building for $6 million in 1984 to the government of the Republic of Indonesia, and it is now used as the Permanent Mission of the Republic of Indonesia to the United Nations. In the late 1990s, architect Stephen B. Jacobs designed an addition to the east side of the building, which was made on the former vacant lot at No. 329.
