= Ray Marcano =

American journalist

Ray Marcano is an American journalist, music critic, and award-winning opinion columnist for the Dayton (OH) Daily News. He was a leader in the nascent internet business for Cox Media Group. In 2000, he became president of the Society of Professional Journalists (SPJ), the largest journalism organization in the United States, only the second Black president of the organization in its history. He was one of the directors of the Cox Media Group, which owns the Dayton Daily News.

== Early life and work ==
Marcano grew up in The Bronx's Monroe housing project. He attended The High School of Music & Art, studying voice, percussion and piano, with the hope to become a R&B star. At school, he was in a band jazz band with jazz bass guitarist Marcus Miller, who later worked with Miles Davis and Herbie Hancock, but felt that he did not have the talent to make it as a professional jazz musician.

Marcano began his career as a journalist in the early 1980s. Around 1981, he began working for a newspaper in Vinita, Oklahoma, and after a two-year stint he joined Tulsa World. A year later, in 1984, Marcano began a long term working for the Dayton Daily News, specializing in medicine. His first news story was a report on the state analysis of hospital charges and how some hospitals overcharge patients. In 1993, the US government reported that when the Ohio Department of Health "turned over floppy disks with hospital admission information", Marcano "easily turned [them] into revealing stories on discrepancies in health care costs and procedures". He has worked for newspapers as a reporter and editor in New York, Ohio and Oklahoma and is also an editor of the book Back in Orbit. Writing for Dayton Daily News, as its news manager for sports, he observed: "I think it's important for newsrooms to be diverse....newspapers have to be able to reflect things that go on in the whole community."

== Later work ==
In 2000, he became president of the Society of Professional Journalists (SPJ), the largest journalism organization in the United States with 300 chapters and 10,000 members. He was only the second black president in the history of the organization, which was founded in 1909. He became the director of digital audience growth for Cox Media Group, a company which owns the Dayton Daily News. He was a lecturer at Wright State University and left in 2023. Marcano received a Fulbright Special Grant at the University of Iceland in 2013.

In 2014, he became editor of the sports website FanBuzz.com where he served for three years. Starting in 2017, he began freelancing for some of the country's largest brands as an editor, including CNN and the Southern Poverty Law Center. As a writer, his editorial work has appeared in USA Today, the Columbus (Ohio) Dispatch and Yahoo News. He has written a weekly Sunday opinion column in the Dayton Daily News since 2021 and continues to write freelance news articles for several national publications.

He was named the best columnist in Ohio two years in a row by the Ohio Society of Professional Journalists He began writing a Fine Wine and Dining column for the Dayton Daily News in 2026. He became a contributing columnist for the Columbus Dispatch and the USA Today Network in 2026.
