= Jerome Snyder =

American graphic designer

Jerome Snyder (1916 – May 2, 1976) was an American illustrator and graphic designer. He is best known as the first art director of the magazine Sports Illustrated and as the co-author of the popular New York City restaurant guidebook The Underground Gourmet written with Milton Glaser.

== Career ==
Snyder was the art director for several significant magazines: serving from 1954 as the first art director of Sports Illustrated he introduced contemporary illustration to editorial matter in an arena previously the domain of photography. He then spent ten years with Scientific American. As a commercial artist, he won a number of awards. He also illustrated children's books and coauthored with Milton Glaser The Underground Gourmet, a popular guidebook to inexpensive restaurants in his native New York City that launched a review column in New York Magazine. He also taught art at such places as Yale University, the Pratt Institute and the Parsons School of Design.

== Personal life ==
Snyder was born in 1916 in New York City and graduated Stuyvesant High School before embarking on his art career. During World War II he served with the infantry as a captain in Europe in the United States Army. He died in 1976 of a heart attack following a touch football game in New York's Central Park.

Snyder shared two sons with his wife, Gertrude, a book illustrator.
