= Edward Sorel =

American cartoonist (born 1929)

- Born: Edward Schwartz; March 26, 1929 (age 97); The Bronx, New York, U.S.
- Occupations: Illustrator, writer

Edward Sorel (born Edward Schwartz, March 26, 1929) is an American illustrator, caricaturist, cartoonist, graphic designer and author. His work is known for its storytelling, its left-liberal social commentary, and its criticism of right-wing politics and organized religion. Formerly a regular contributor to The Nation, New York Magazine and The Atlantic, his work is today seen more frequently in Vanity Fair. He has been hailed by The New York Times as "one of America's foremost political satirists". As a lifelong New Yorker, a large portion of his work interprets the life, culture and political events of New York City. There is also a large body of work which is nostalgic for the stars of 1930s and 1940s Hollywood when Sorel was a youth. Sorel is noted for his wavy pen-and-ink style, which he describes as "spontaneous direct drawing".

== Early life ==
Sorel was born and grew up in The Bronx, the son of Jewish immigrants. His father was a door-to-door dry goods salesman, and his mother worked full-time in a hatmaking factory. When a case of double pneumonia confined Sorel to bed for nearly a year, he passed the time learning to draw and it evolved into a career path. He attended the High School of Music & Art, and graduated from the Cooper Union in 1951.

As he explains in Mary Astor's Purple Diary, he took his name from the character Julien Sorel of The Red and the Black by Stendhal, with whom he felt akin because both hated their fathers, the clergy and the corrupt society of their time.

== Career ==
Sorel was a co-founder of Push Pin Studios with Milton Glaser, Seymour Chwast, and Reynold Ruffins in 1953.

In 1956 Sorel went freelance. His first published illustration was A War for Civilization, which he sold to the satirical magazine The Realist; in 1961. He then sold the magazine a cartoon satirizing the glamor of the Kennedy family, an early example of his parody movie posters. Victor Navasky appointed him art director for the satirical magazine Monocle in 1963. The illustrations that accompanied the 1966 article “Frank Sinatra Has a Cold” were made by Sorel, who also did the artwork for the front cover of the Esquire issue the article was in. In the later 1960s he produced full-color satirical bestiaries for the left-wing journal Ramparts, and a series called "Sorel's Unfamiliar Quotations" for The Atlantic. A profile of Sorel in Time 15 October 1968 was instrumental in selling "Sorel's News Service" by King Features to 44 syndicated newspapers for 14 months from later 1969 through 1970. Clay Felker founded New York magazine in the late 1960s and Glaser hired Sorel as its art director in the late 1970s.

Sorel also contributed covers and features to early issues of National Lampoon. When Felker bought the Village Voice in 1974 Sorel was given a weekly spot there, which lasted for most of the 1970s. By the mid-1980s Sorel moved to The Nation, now edited by his old colleague Navasky, and to which he contributed for the next decade. Sorel joined The New Yorker in late 1992 contributing a cover to the first issue edited by new editor Tina Brown. He has contributed many illustrations, features, and 44 covers to The New Yorker.

He has contributed many features to Vanity Fair. His art has also appeared on the covers of Harper's Magazine, Fortune, Forbes, Esquire, Time, American Heritage, Atlantic Monthly. Sorel also had a lengthy association with Penthouse, often lavishly reworking earlier drawings and ideas from his work for The Village Voice and The Nation.

In 2007 he completed the celebrated mural for the Waverly Inn in New York's Greenwich Village, which was published as a book, The Mural at the Waverly Inn in 2008. In 2009 he completed the mural for the redesigned Monkey Bar Restaurant in New York City.

As a writer, Sorel has reviewed books and exhibitions of fellow cartoonists and illustrators for such publications as The New York Times, The New York Observer, and American Heritage magazine.

In February 2010 he was named to the Freedom From Religion Foundation's Honorary Board of distinguished achievers.

In 2016, Sorel published "Mary Astor's Purple Diary," which was received with praise. In late December 2016, Sorel received a rave book review by Woody Allen.

== Personal life ==
Sorel has been married twice. He met his second wife, Nancy Caldwell, in 1963 at a Quakers Morningside Friends Meeting, and married her in 1965. Sorel and Caldwell have collaborated on two books, with Caldwell writing the text and Sorel doing the illustrations. Sorel has four children: Madeline Sorel Kahn, Leo Sorel, Jenny Sorel, Katherine Sorel; and six grandchildren: Saskia Kahn, Sabella Kahn, Walter Sorel, Adam Sorel, Dulio Sorel, and Thelonious Sorel.

== Exhibitions ==
In 1998, the National Portrait Gallery in Washington, DC, devoted several rooms to an exhibition of his caricatures. Other solo shows include the Graham Gallery and the Davis and Langdale Gallery in New York City, the Susan Conway Gallery in Washington, DC, The Art Institute of Boston, Galerie Bartsch & Chariau in Munich, Germany, and Chris Beetles Gallery in London.

== Awards ==
He is a recipient of the Auguste St. Gaudens Medal for Professional Achievement from Cooper Union (his alma mater), the Hamilton King Award from The Society of Illustrators, the Page One Award from the Newspaper Guild, the Best in Illustration Award from the National Cartoonists Society, the George Polk Award for Satiric Drawing, and the "Karikaturpreis der deutschen Anwaltschaft" from the Wilhelm Busch Museum in Hanover, Germany. He received the National Cartoonist Society Advertising and Illustration Award for 1993. In 2001, Sorel was given the Hunter College James Aronson Award for Social Justice Journalism Lifetime Achievement Award. In 2001 the Art Directors Club of New York elected him to their Hall of Fame, the first cartoonist since John Held Jr. to be so honored. Ed Sorel serves as an Honorary Board Member of the Freedom From Religion Foundation.

In 2011, the School of Visual Arts in Manhattan honored Sorel as part of their Masters Series, an award and exhibition that honors great visual communicators. The SVA produced a documentary about Sorel entitled Nice Work if You Can Get It directed by his son, Leo. The documentary is now streaming on Vimeo.

In 2022, he was awarded the Reuben Award for Outstanding Cartoonist of the Year by the National Cartoonists Society.

== Bibliography ==
=== Adults' books ===
- How to be President: Some Hard and Fast Rules (Grove Press, 1960)
- Moon Missing (Simon & Schuster, 1962)
- Sorel's World's Fair (McGraw-Hill, 1964)
- Making the World Safe for Hypocrisy (Swallow Press, 1972)
- Superpen: the Cartoons and Caricatures of Edward Sorel (Random House, 1978)
- Unauthorized Portraits (Alfred A. Knopf, 1997)
- Literary Lives (Bloomsbury, 2006)
- Just When You Thought Things Couldn't Get Worse: The Cartoons and Comic Strips of Edward Sorel (W.W. Norton, 2007)
- The Mural at the Waverly Inn: A Portrait of Greenwich Village Bohemians (Pantheon, 2008)
- Mary Astor's Purple Diary: The Great American Sex Scandal of 1936 (Liveright Publishing, 2016)
- Sorel, Edward (2021). Profusely illustrated : a memoir (First ed.). New York: Alfred A. Knopf. ISBN 9780525521068.

=== Children's books ===
- The Zillionaire's Daughter (Warner Juvenile Books, 1989)
- Johnny-on-the-Spot (M.K. McElderry Books, 1998)
- The Saturday Kid, with Cheryl Carlesimo (M.K. McElderry Books, 2000)

=== Collaborations ===
- Word People, by Nancy Caldwell Sorel (American Heritage Press, 1970)
- First Encounters: a Book of Memorable Meetings, by Nancy Caldwell Sorel (Knopf, 1994)

=== As Illustrator ===
- King Carlo of Capri, by Warren Miller (Harcourt, Brace & Comp., 1958)
- Pablo Paints a Picture, by Warren Miller (Little, Brown, 1959)
- The Goings-on at Little Wishful, by Warren Miller (Little, Brown, 1959)
- Gwendolyn the Miracle Hen, by Nancy Sherman (Golden Press, 1961)
- Gwendolyn and the Weathercock by Nancy Sherman (Golden Press, 1963)
- What's Good For A Five-Year-Old, by William Cole (Holt, Rinehart & Winston, 1969)
- The Duck in the Gun, by Joy Cowley (Doubleday, 1969)
- Jay Williams' Magical Storybook (American Heritage Press, 1972)
- The Pirates of Penzance, by Ward Botsford (Random House, 1981)
- Jack and the Beanstalk, by Eric Metaxas (Rabbit Ears Books, 2006)
- The Complete Fables of la Fontaine: A New Translation in Verse, by Jean de la Fontaine and Craig Hill (Arcade Pub., 2008)
- Certitude: A Profusely Illustrated Guide to Blockheads and Bullheads, Past and Present, by Adam Begley (Harmony Books, 2009)
