= Janine Fondon =

American journalist

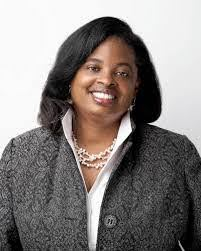
- Born: Janine Eva Denegall; 1960; Queens, New York, U.S.
- Education: New York University, Colgate University, Bay Path University
- Occupations: Journalist, author, professor, curator, public relations
- Writing career
- Pen name: Janine Fondon
- Website: www.janinefondon.com

Janine Eva Fondon (born 1960, Janine Eva Denegall) is a journalist, entrepreneur, African American public relations professional, exhibit curator, and professor. Janine Fondon is the president and CEO of diverse news company UnityFirst.com.

== Early life and college ==
In the mid-1960s, Fondon was bused from her neighborhood in Queens, New York, to the North Hills School in Little Neck, New York.

In 1975 she left the Louis Pasteur Middle School in Little Neck, New York, and entered the "Fame School", Fiorello H. LaGuardia High School of Music & Art and Performing Arts in Harlem.

She graduated high school at Carnegie Hall in 1978 and subsequently enrolled at Colgate University where she graduated in 1982. Janine Fondon earned a Bachelor of Arts degree in Sociology and Anthropology from Colgate University. She has studied abroad at the University of West Indies in Barbados and completed study tours to London and Paris.

She then went to graduate school at New York University and graduated in 1984 with a Master of Arts in Communications and Business. Janine graduated with an MFA in Creative Nonfiction Writing from Bay Path University's MFA Program.

=== Family history ===
Fondon's aunt is Irene Morgan Kirkaldy, a notable activist who refused to sit in the back of the bus to accommodate white passengers in 1944, more than ten years prior to Rosa Parks’ famous protest. Morgan Kirkaldy was represented in court by Thurgood Marshall.

== Career ==
Fondon has held management positions in corporate communications across a spectrum of industries: Digital Equipment Corporation, BankBoston, ABC-TV (New York and Washington, DC), and CBS-TV (New York).

=== UnityFirst.com ===
Janine Fondon co-founded UnityFirst.com with her husband Tom in 1996. UnityFirst.com is one of the earliest African American online newsletters that shares diversity-related content with more than 500,000 people. UnityFirst.com originally began as a print newspaper, but Fondon saw where news trends were heading. "As we moved from being a print publication to online, and more diversity consulting," Fondon said, "we saw companies had all the pieces, so we would work to help them connect the dots."

=== On the Move Forum and Voices of Resilience ===
Janine launched the On the Move Forum to Advance Women Forum in 2017 to engage women and women of color across industries and levels in conversations to promote leadership. To preserve the history of women of color in various disciplines, she has cultivated an exhibit called "The Intersection." In 2020, she curated an exhibit entitled, "Voices of Resilience: The Intersection of Women on the Move" at the Springfield Museums, a Smithsonian Museum affiliate. The exhibit shares the untold and lesser-known stories of women and women of color during the early fight for women's rights, abolition and more. The "Voices of Resilience: The Intersection of Women on the Move" traveling exhibit that has been featured at Westfield State University, Framingham State University, Longmeadow Adult Center, and Center Church South Hadley.

=== Education ===
Fondon has been chair of the Undergraduate Communications Department, and assistant professor of Undergraduate Communications at Bay Path University. She is one of the longest-running African American educators at Bay Path. Fondon's experience in education includes teaching appointments at Bay Path University, Westfield State University, Cambridge College, and Charter Oak State College. Throughout her career, she has taught many subjects: mass communication, principles of public relations, integrated marketing, entrepreneurship, marketing principles, consulting skills, intercultural communication, management, diversity in the workplace, women in the workplace, human communications, social media, and journalism/digital media. Fondon leads educational tours to New York City, Boston and Washington, D.C. with a focus on media and communications.

== Honors and awards ==
2018 – Janine Fondon was named one of the top African American female professors by the AAFPA (African American Female Professors Association) and was also recognized by Bay Path University with an award for her leadership. Fondon has been recognized with the Alpha Kappa Alpha Sorority Regional Entrepreneurial Award, National Council of Negro Women's Regional Women of Conviction Award, and Massachusetts Women's Political Caucus Abigail Adams Leadership Award, among others. In 2011, Fondon received an honorary degree from Springfield Technical Community College, citing her leadership at WTCC 90.7 FM radio, the City of Springfield's most diverse radio station with some 20+ culturally inclusive programs. She was also chosen as one of the "Western Massachusetts Women to Watch" by Western Massachusetts Women's Magazine. NYC's Network Journal named her one of the 25 Influential Black Women in Business.

2011 – Women Business Owners Alliance awarded Janine Fondon the WBOA Outstanding New Member Award.

2020 – Janine Fondon was awarded the Advertising Club of Western Massachusetts William Pynchon Medal.

== Publications ==
=== Articles ===
- Early African American grads set high standard, Janine Fondon and Kathryn Gibson. Springfield Republican; 2010.
- Commentary: Future success in Pioneer Valley depends on collaboration, common ground, Janine Fondon. Springfield Republican; 2012.
- One People, One House: Truth-telling now is path forward to address racism in America, Janine Fondon. Springfield Republican; 2020.
- Suffrage 100: Journey to right to vote shows intersection of lives of Black, white women, Janine Fondon. Springfield Republican; 2020.
- Leaders with a message – Tuskegee airmen, Janine Fondon. UnityFirst.com; 2023.
- Photographer Chester Higgins NYC Exhibit, Janine Fondon. UnityFirst.com; 2023.
- Chief Diversity Officers Report 2024, Janine Fondon. UnityFirst.com; 2024.
- Massachusetts Prostate Cancer Coalition, Janine Fondon. UnityFirst.com; 2024.
- Stirring the Pot, Janine Fondon. Multiplicity Magazine.

=== Books ===
Fondon is presently working on her first historical fiction book, publication expected by January 2025.

- The Power of Women: Celebrating women from Western and Central Massachusetts from the 1600's to the Present Day, Wayne E. Phaneuf, contributor: Janine Fondon. Springfield Republican; 2018.
- It's Our Movement Now: Black Women's Politics and the 1977 National Women's Conference, Laura Lovett, contributor: Janine Fondon. University Press of Florida; 2022.
