= Balmer (surname) =

Balmer is a surname. Notable people with the surname include:

- Billy Balmer (1875–1961), English footballer who played for Everton
- Bob Balmer (1882–?), English footballer who played for Everton
- Charles Balmer (1817–1892), German-born American musician
- Earl Balmer (1935–2019), former NASCAR Cup Series driver
- Edwin Balmer (1883–1959), American science fiction writer
- George Balmer (c.1806–1846), English painter
- Jack Balmer (1916–1984), English football player
- Jacqueline Balmer or Jacquie de Creed (1957–2011), British stuntwoman
- John Balmer (1910–1944), Royal Australian Air Force officer
- Johann Jakob Balmer (1825–1898), Swiss mathematician and physicist
- Josephine Balmer (born 1959), British poet and translator
- Kofi Balmer (born 2000), Northern Irish footballer
- Lori Balmer, Australian pop singer
- Randall Balmer (born 1954), American author
- Robert Balmer (1787–1844), Scottish theologian
- Thomas A. Balmer (born 1952), Oregon Chief Justice

== See also ==
- Ballmer, surname
