= Alois Emanuel Biedermann =

Swiss Protestant theologian (1819–1885)

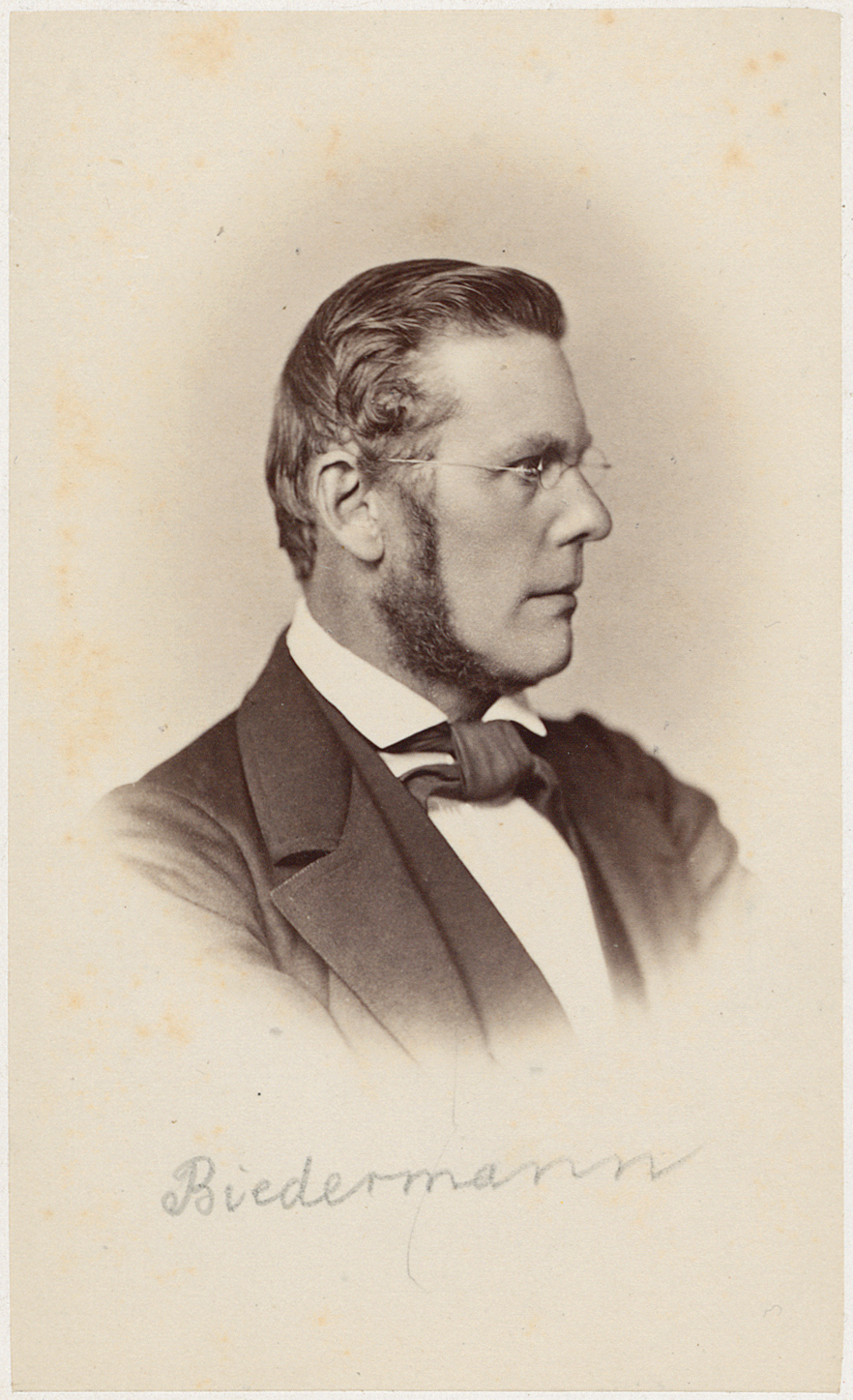
Alois Emanuel Biedermann

Alois Emanuel Biedermann (2 March 1819, in Münchhof near Bendlikon – 25 January 1885, in Zürich) was a Swiss Protestant theologian. He was a prominent dogmatician of the so-called "Young Hegelian" school of thought, and an important advocate of "free Christianity" in Switzerland.

He studied theology at the University of Basel as a pupil of Wilhelm Martin Leberecht de Wette and Wilhelm Wackernagel, and where, with his good friend, Jacob Burckhardt, he tried his hand at poetry. In 1839 he relocated to the University of Berlin, where he was student of Wilhelm Vatke. At Berlin, he engaged himself in studies of works by Friedrich Daniel Ernst Schleiermacher and Georg Wilhelm Friedrich Hegel. In addition to Schleiermacher and Hegel, another important influence was a contemporary, the German theologian David Friedrich Strauss.

From 1843 to 1850 he served as pastor in the town of Münchenstein, and during this time period (1845–50), with David Fries (1818–1875), he was editor of Kirche der Gegenwart, a publication of speculative-critical theology. In 1850, despite opposition from conservatives, he was named an associate professor of theology at the University of Zürich. In 1860 he attained a full professorship of dogmatics at Zürich.

He was a member of the Schweizerischer Zofingerverein (Swiss Zofinger Society) and a participant in Alfred Escher's Mittwochsgesellschaft. From 1871 onward, he was active in cantonal politics, being a member of the liberal-conservative party.

== Selected works ==
- Die freie Theologie oder Philosophie und Christentum in Streit und Frieden, 1844 – The free theology or philosophy and Christianity in conflict and peace.
- Unsere junghegelsche Weltanschauung oder der sogennante neuste Pantheismus, 1849 – Young Hegelian philosophy or the latest so-called Pantheism.
- Christliche Dogmatik, 1869 – Christian dogmatics.
- Heinrich Lang, 1876 – a biography of Heinrich Lang.
- Strauss et la théologie contemporaine, 1882 (translated from German by Charles Ritter and Pierre Vaucher) – David Friedrich Strauss and contemporary theology.
- Ausgewählte Vorträge und Aufsätze, 1885 – Selected lectures and essays with a biographical introduction by Johann Kradolfer (1835-1897).

Books written about Alois Emanuel Biedermann:

- Der junge Alois Emanuel Biedermann: Lebensweg und theologische Entwicklung bis zur "Freien Theologie" 1819-1844 by Thomas K. Kuhn : Mohr Siebeck, 471 pages (1997) – The young Alois Emanuel Biedermann : Journey and theological development to "open theology" 1819-1844.
