= Miami Ad School =

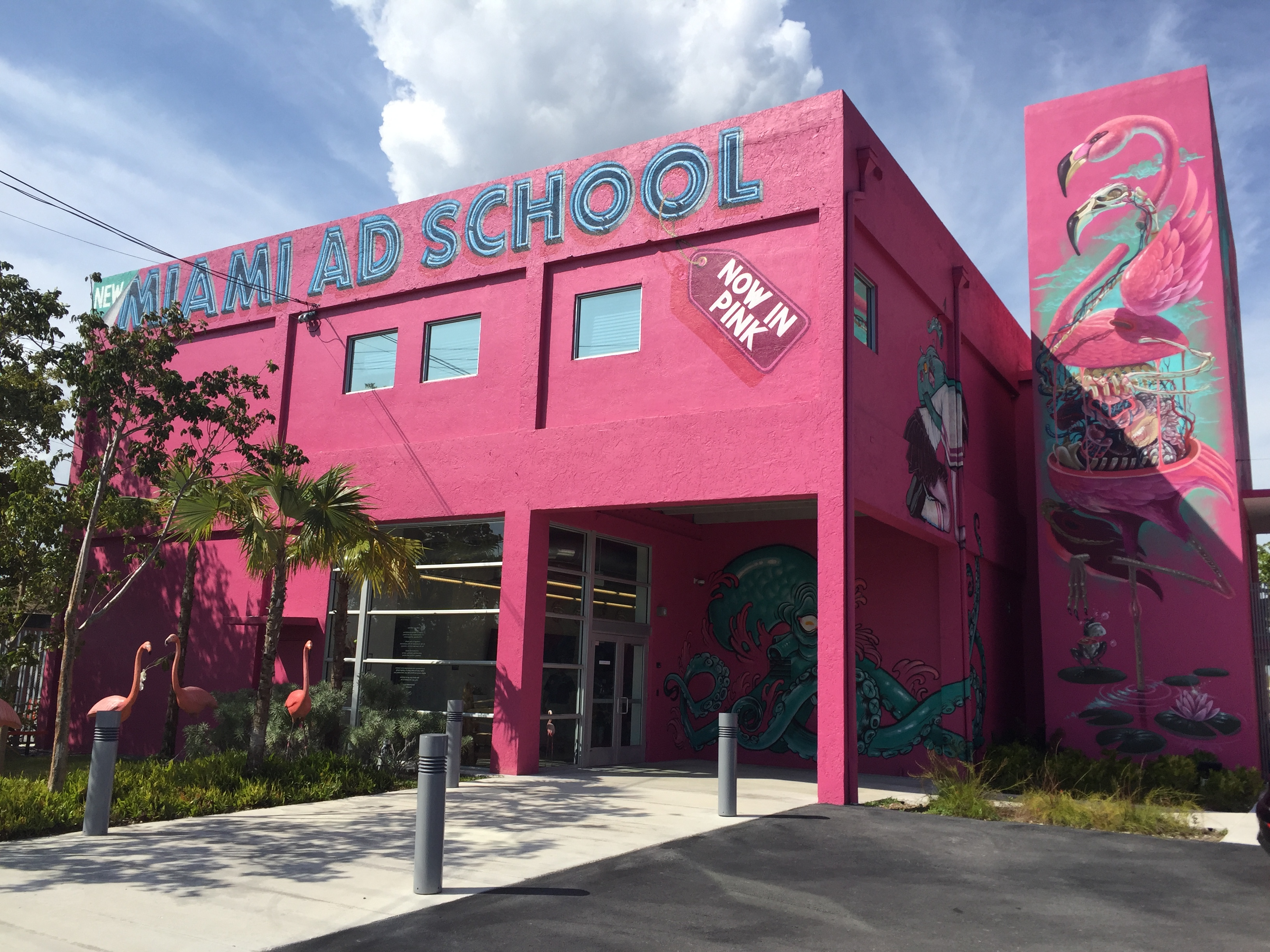
- Facade of the main building of Miami Ad School in Miami, Florida, featuring work from international street artists
- Type: Private for-profit portfolio school
- Founders: Ron Seichrist, Pippa Seichrist
- Location: Miami, Florida, United States; 25°46′49″N 80°08′26″W
- Website: www.miamiadschool.com

Miami Ad School is a private for-profit portfolio school headquartered in Miami, Florida. The school was founded by Ron and Pippa Seichrist in 1993 in Miami Beach. It has locations in three other U.S. cities and affiliate schools in eight other countries.

== Foundation and programs ==
Miami Ad School was founded in 1993 by Ron Seichrist, a former creative director, and his wife, Pippa, also a former creative director. Miami Ad School's four US locations are accredited by the Council on Occupational Education, having initially been a candidate for accreditation in 1994, and received accreditation in 1995. It has since been described as among "the most prestigious institutions of higher education" in the field of design.

Among its programs, the school offers three-month Boot Camps for Strategic Planning and Social Media. According to industry journal Adweek: "The facility operates in many ways like a traditional agency, in that students direct spots, write advertising copy, and learn to manage budgets." In May 2012, the school also launched its professional training workshops to provide instruction on recent trends for advertising industry professionals. The program was launched in Brooklyn, New York City.

== Notable campaigns ==
=== Words Can Kill ===
In 2013, Miami Ad School students in the school's San Francisco campus created an ad campaign for The Trevor Project, highlighting the danger of the bullying of LGBT youth leading to suicide.

=== The Underground Library ===
Also in 2013, Miami Ad School students in New York developed "a fictional promotion for the New York Public Library that would leverage public transportation," allowing commuters to temporarily download excerpts from best-selling books. The proposal drew some interest from local libraries, and a similar promotion was eventually launched in train stations in Philadelphia.

=== Underground Stations ===
In a similar campaign in 2014, "Miami Ad School students teamed up with Pandora to create the "Underground Stations" campaign highlighting subway musicians."

=== Other Campaigns ===
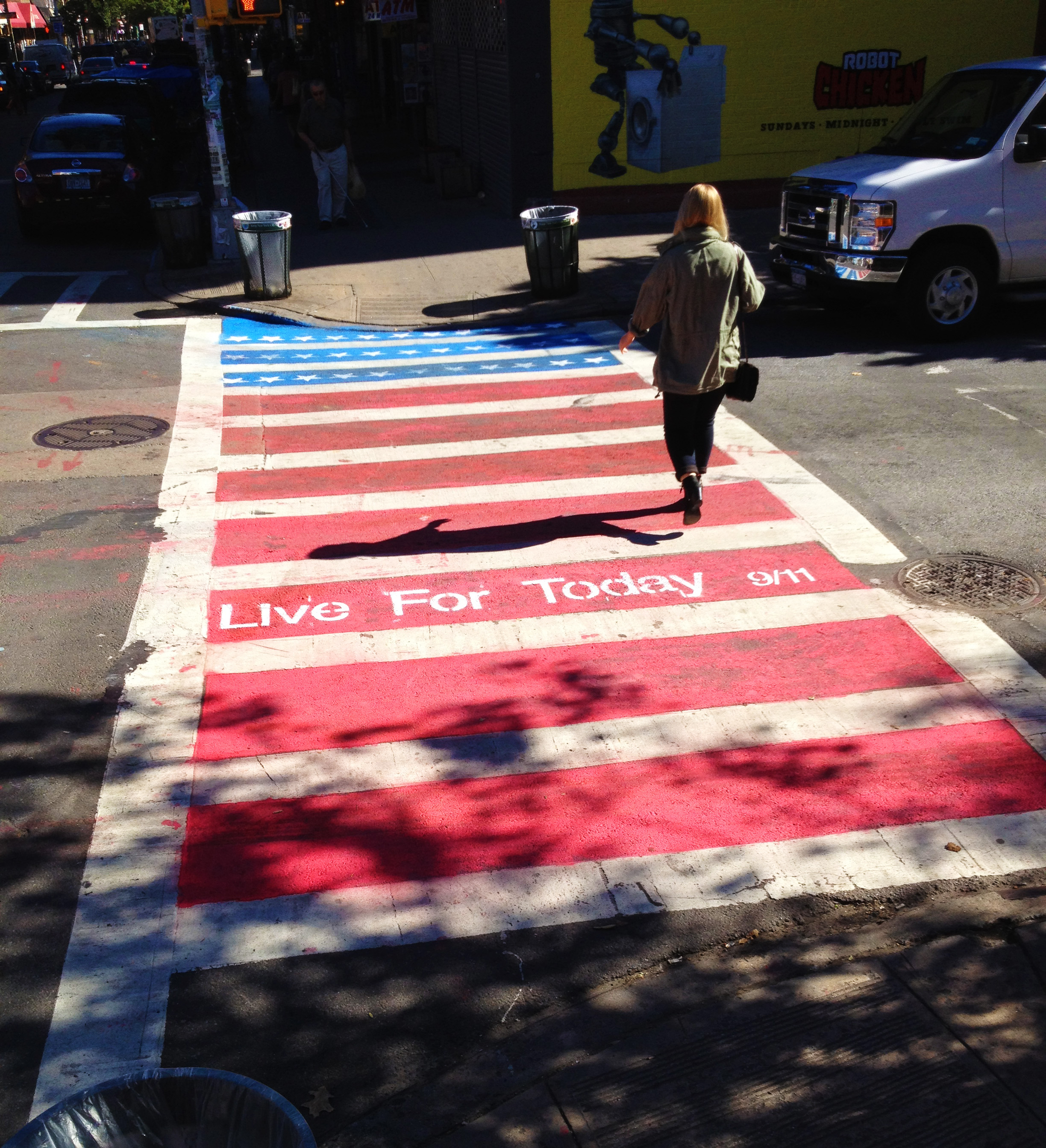
Patriotic American flag crosswalks found in NYC on 9/11/12

In 2012, Miami Ad School New York students created an unsanctioned guerrilla installation of American-flag crosswalks across SoHo, the Financial District and Williamsburg, Brooklyn, to mark the anniversary of September 11. The crosswalks — painted with red and white stripes, white stars on blue, and the words “Live For Today 9/11” — were intended to "symbolize unity and remembrance" through everyday urban space. While short-lived, the project anticipated a wider movement of crosswalk art later adopted by cities as part of public art and placemaking initiatives.

In 2011, students developed a marketing campaign for a Russian vodka brand involving a virtual "Russian roulette," where four participants would provide their Facebook login details, with the "loser" having his Facebook account permanently deleted, and the "winners" being entered in a sweepstakes to win a trip to Russia.

In 2007, the school advertised its own programs by creating a magazine ad containing perforated trading cards representing famous advertising industry people, and in 2010 it did so by creating its own bottled water brand, named "Smudge Slobber" after the founder's dog.

== Locations ==
=== United States ===
- Atlanta, Georgia
- Miami, Florida
- New York City, New York

=== International ===
- Berlin, Germany
- Buenos Aires, Argentina
- Madrid, Spain
- Mexico City, Mexico
- Mumbai, India
- Punta Cana, Dominican Republic
- Rio de Janeiro, Brazil
- Sao Paulo, Brazil
- Sydney, Australia
- Colombo, Sri Lanka
