= Reynold Ruffins =

American graphic designer (1930–2021)

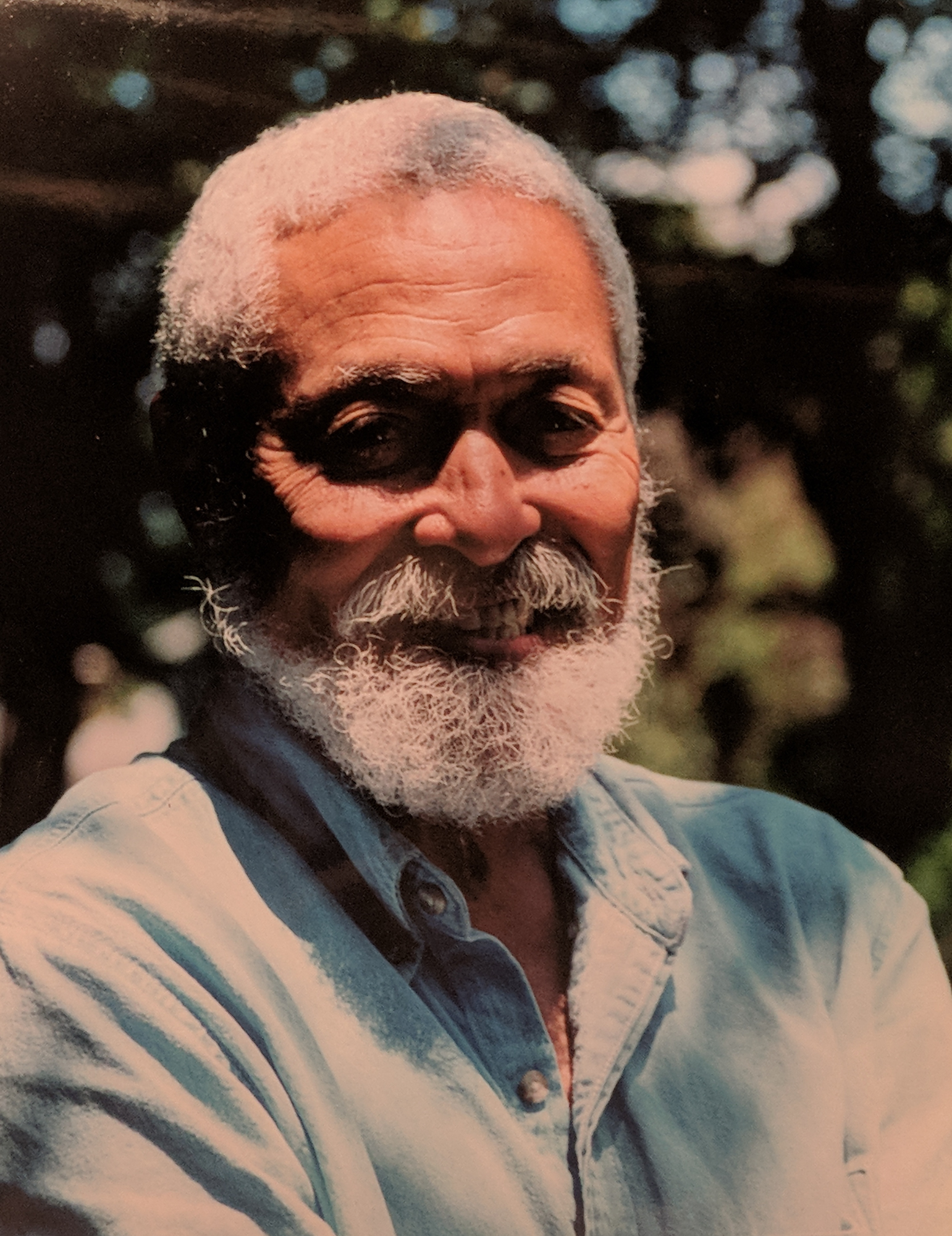
- Ruffins in 2013
- Born: August 5, 1930; New York City, U.S.
- Died: July 11, 2021 (aged 90); Sag Harbor, New York, U.S.
- Education: Cooper Union
- Known for: Painting, children's book illustration, graphic design
- Awards: Augustus St. Gaudens Award (Cooper Union); Cooper Union Presidential Citation; Coretta Scott King Illustrator Honor Award, 1997; New York Art Directors Club; Silver Medal, the Society of Illustrators

Reynold Dash Ruffins (August 5, 1930 – July 11, 2021) was an American painter, illustrator, and graphic designer. With Milton Glaser, Edward Sorel, and Seymour Chwast, Ruffins founded Push Pin Studios in 1954. An illustrator of more than twenty children's books, Ruffins is known for his "stylistic versatility, vibrant colors, and penchant for fanciful creatures." He has had many solo exhibitions and been part of group show exhibitions at Paris's Musée du Louvre, and in Milan, Bologna, and Tokyo.

== Biography ==
Ruffins attended the High School of Music & Art in New York City and Cooper Union. While a student at Cooper Union he co-founded Design Plus with Seymour Chwast, Milton Glaser, and Edward Sorel. It was a short-lived venture. After graduation the collaborative partnership evolved and in 1954, he co-founded Push Pin Studios with fellow Cooper graduates Glaser, Sorel, and Chwast. In 1963, after leaving Push Pin, Ruffins co-founded another design studio with Simms Taback, a partnership which lasted for more than thirty years. Commercial clients included IBM, AT&T, Coca-Cola, CBS, Pfizer, the New York Times, Time Life, Fortune, Gourmet Magazine, and the U.S. Post Office.

Ruffins entered the field of children's book illustration in 1969, and throughout the 1970s and early 1980s he frequently collaborated with writer Jane Sarnoff.

In 1991, Ruffins teamed with Whoopi Goldberg and Herbie Hancock to produce "Koi and the Kola Nuts," a highly praised video for children which was part of Rabbit Ears Productions' We All Have Tales series.

Ruffins died at home on Sunday July 11, 2021, surrounded by family. He lived in Sag Harbor, New York; his wife Joan died in 2013.

=== Teaching ===
A professor emeritus at CUNY's Queens College, Ruffins has also taught at the School of Visual Arts, Parsons The New School for Design, and was a visiting adjunct professor at Syracuse University.

== Awards ==
Ruffins was the recipient of the Augustus St. Gaudens Award (presented by Cooper Union) for outstanding professional achievement in the arts. The Cooper Union Presidential Citation was also presented to Ruffins for his work and prominence in his profession. Ruffins's work led to awards from the New York Art Directors Club and a Silver Medal from the Society of Illustrators. Ruffins won the Coretta Scott King Illustrator Honor Award in 1997 for the book Running the Road to ABC (written by Denize Lauture). His illustrations for the Haitian author earned Mr. Ruffins international honors.

== Bibliography ==
As illustrator, unless otherwise noted:

- The Amazing Maze (E. P. Dutton, 1969) – written by Harry Hartwick (co-illustrated with Simms Taback)
- Camels: Ships of the Desert (HarperCollins, 1974) – written by John Frederick Waters
- The Chess Book (Scribner, 1973) – written by Jane Sarnoff
- The Monster Riddle Book (Scribner, 1975) – written by Jane Sarnoff
- The Code & Cipher Book (MacMillan, 1975) – written by Jane Sarnoff
- Space (Scribner, 1978) — written by Jane Sarnoff
- My Brother Never Feeds the Cat (Scribner, 1979) – writer and illustrator
- Misoso: Once Upon a Time Tales from Africa (Knopf, 1994) – written by Verna Aardema
- Running the Road to ABC (Simon & Schuster, 1996) – written by Denize Lauture
- Everywhere Faces Everywhere (Simon & Schuster, 1997) – written by James Berry
- There Was an Old Lady Who Swallowed a Trout! (Henry Holt, 1998) – written by Teri Sloat
- The Gift of the Crocodile: A Cinderella Story (Simon & Schuster, 2000) – written by Judy Sierra
- Marco's Run (Green Light Readers, 2001) – written by Wesley Cartier
- A Friend for King Amadou (Houghton Mifflin, 2006) – written by Robert McKissack
