= Push Pin Studios =

American graphic design studio

- Industry: Graphic design, Illustration, Communications, Advertising, Marketing
- Founded: 1954; 72 years ago
- Founder: Milton Glaser and Seymour Chwast
- Headquarters: New York City
- Key people: Milton Glaser; Seymour Chwast; Reynold Ruffins; Edward Sorel
- Products: album covers, book covers, posters, packaging, advertisements, and corporate and environmental logos and graphics
- Website: www.pushpininc.com

Push Pin Studios is a graphic design and illustration studio founded by the influential graphic designers Milton Glaser and Seymour Chwast in New York City in 1954. The firm's work, and distinctive illustration style, featuring "bulgy" three-dimensional "interpretations of historical styles (Victorian, art nouveau, art deco),"made their mark by departing from what the firm refers to as the "numbing rigidity of modernism, and the rote sentimental realism of commercial illustration." Eye magazine contextualized the results in a 1995 article for their "Reputations" column:

In an era dominated by Swiss rationalism, the Push Pin style celebrated the eclectic and eccentric design of the passé past while it introduced a distinctly contemporary design vocabulary, with a wide range of work that included record sleeves, books, posters, corporate logotypes, font design and magazine formats.

== History ==
After graduating from Cooper Union, Sorel and Chwast worked for a short time at Esquire magazine, both being fired on the same day. Joining forces to form an art studio, they called it "Push Pin" after a mailing piece, The Push Pin Almanack, which they self-published during their time at Esquire. Sorel and Chwast used their unemployment checks to rent a cold-water flat on East 17th Street in Manhattan. A few months later, Glaser returned from a Fulbright Fellowship year in Italy and joined the studio.

Sorel left Push Pin in 1956, the same day the studio moved into a much nicer space on East 57th Street. For twenty years Glaser and Chwast directed Push Pin, along with graphic designers and illustrators such as John Alcorn (in the late 1950s), Paul Davis (1959–1963), Barry Zaid (1969–1975), Paul Degen (1970s) among others. Today, Chwast is principal of The Pushpin Group, Inc.

Over the last six decades, the firm's work, and that of the founding designers, along with Reynold Ruffins, Edward Sorel and several other designers who have been associated with it, has led to several books, as well as publication in The New York Times, The New Yorker, The Wall Street Journal, Vanity Fair, The Atlantic, and Print (magazine) and traveling exhibitions, such as "The Push Pin Style," which traveled to the Museum of Decorative Arts of the Louvre, as well as numerous cities in Europe, Brazil, and Japan in 1970–72.

== Related publications ==
The firm's in-house publications included The Push Pin Almanack and The Push Pin Graphic. Out of house, the founding team served as art directors of Audience magazine, a high-end, subscription-only bimonthly arts and literature periodical, for whom Glaser and Chwast "used photographs, drawings, big pictures and lavish colors to accompany articles by Donald Barthelme, Herbert Gold, Martin Mayer, Thomas Whiteside and Frank Capra, among others." Founded in 1971, under Glaser and Chwast's direction, it won the top award of the Society of Publication Designers in 1972. In 1973, however, it folded due to lack of funding.

== Gallery ==
(Selection was limited by availability.)

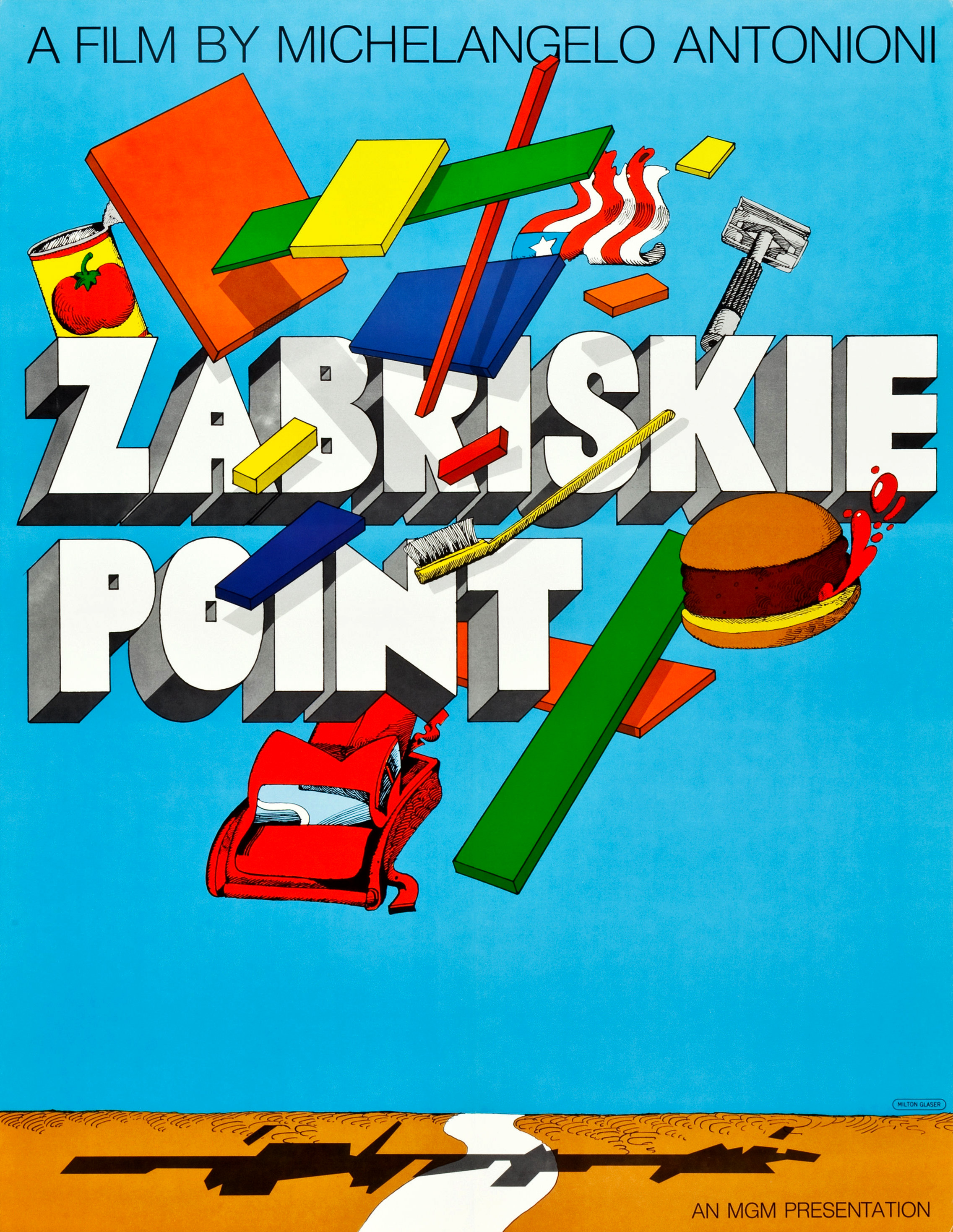
A 1970 movie poster by Milton Glaser.

Milton Glaser's typeface "Baby Teeth."

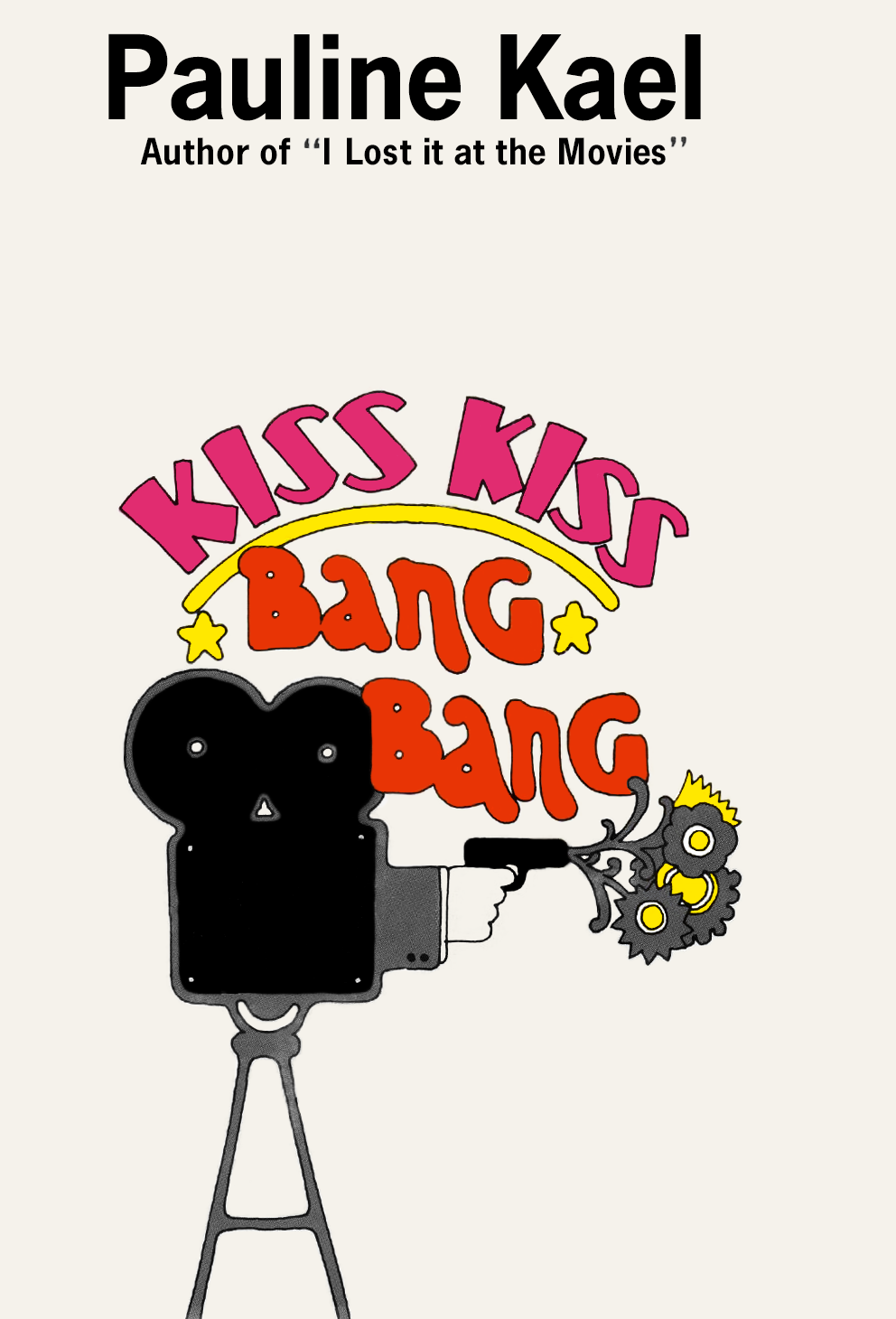
Book Jacket design by Seymour Chwast in 1968.

== Bibliography ==
- Chwast, Seymour. Push Pin Graphic: A Quarter Century of Innovative Design and Illustration. Chronicle Books, 2004.

== Exhibitions ==
- 1970 "The Push Pin Style" — Musée des Arts décoratifs, Paris (March 18 – May 18, 1970); later traveled to Brazil and Japan
- 2021 "The Push Pin Legacy" — Poster House (September 2, 2021–February 6, 2022)
