= Théo Ballmer =

Swiss artist, graphic designer and photographer

Theo Ballmer
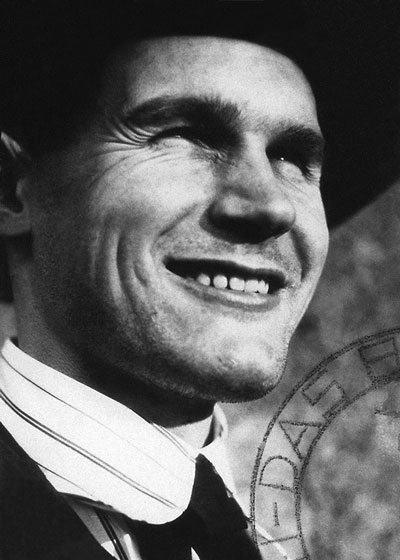
- Born: Auguste Théophile Ballmer; 29 September 1902; Lausanne, Switzerland
- Died: 10 December 1965 (aged 63); Basel, Switzerland

Théo Ballmer (1902-1965) was a Swiss graphic designer, photographer, and professor. He is best known for his Modernist poster designs which influenced the development of the International Typographic Style.

== Life and career ==
Auguste Théophile Ballmer was born in Lausanne in 1902. He trained as a draftsman and studied under Ernst Keller at the Zurich Kunstgewerbeschule. Ballmer began professional work in Basel as a designer for Hoffmann-La Roche in 1926. In his years at the company, Ballmer became acquainted with a number of avant-garde contemporaries, including Hannes Meyer.

In 1928, Ballmer enrolled in the Bauhaus, then under the direction of Meyer. At the school, he studied photography under Walter Peterhans. Ballmer left the Bauhaus in 1930, motivated by his left-leaning political beliefs. Ballmer is best known for his political poster designs, produced directly after his departure from the school. The works are characterized by their use of red and black linocut silhouettes and leftist messages.

In 1931, Ballmer joined the faculty of the Allgemeine Gewerbeschule Basel, where he taught photography and design. Ballmer remained associated with the school until his death in 1965.After 1930, Ballmer additionally worked for a number of corporate clients; among the work he produced in this capacity is the logo for the Basel municipal authority.

In the mid 1940s, Ballmer and his contemporary, Max Bill, pioneered a new style of graphic design characterized by the use of photography, sans serif typefaces, and logical arrangement of elements. The work produced by the two designers in this period proved foundational to the later emergence of the International Typographic Style.

Théo Ballmer died in 1965.

He is the father of Theo Ballmer II, who is famous for having created the recognizable logotype of Ouest-France in 1971, which is the most read francophone newspaper in the world, ahead of French national newspapers Le Figaro and Le Monde.
