= Milton Glaser =

American graphic designer (1929–2020)

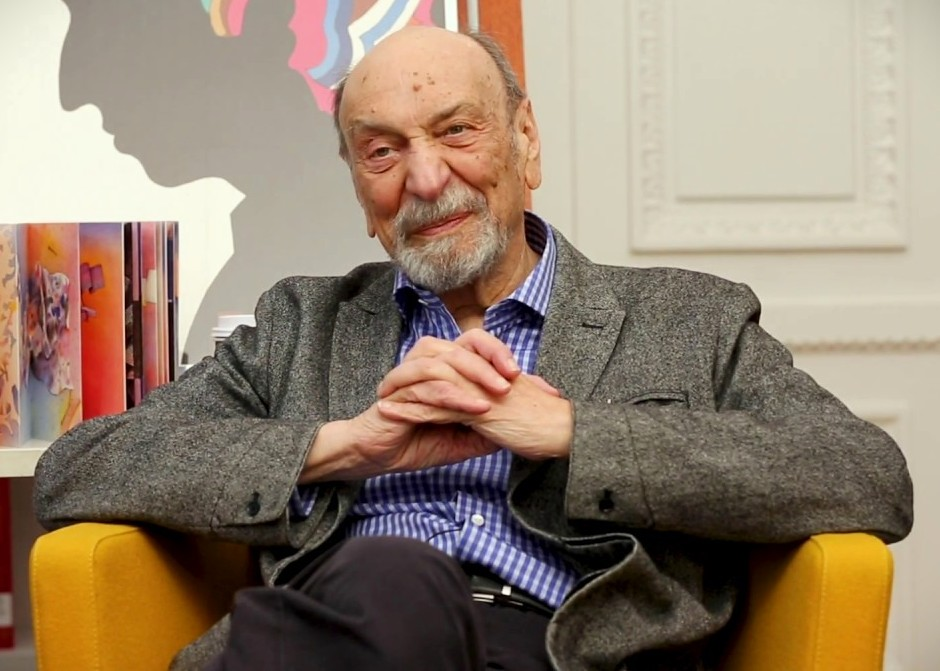
- Glaser pictured at the Cooper Hewitt museum with his iconic Dylan poster in the background (2016)
- Born: June 26, 1929; The Bronx, New York, U.S.
- Died: June 26, 2020 (aged 91); Manhattan, New York, U.S.
- Education: Cooper Union; Accademia di Belle Arti di Bologna
- Notable work: Dylan poster (1966); I ❤ NY logo (1977); DC Comics logo (1977)
- Spouse: Shirley Girton (m. 1957)
- Relatives: Steven Brower (first cousin once removed)
- Awards: National Design Award for lifetime achievement (2004); National Medal of Arts (2009)
- Website: MiltonGlaser.com

Milton Glaser (June 26, 1929 – June 26, 2020) was an American graphic designer whose most recognized works include the I ❤ NY logo, the 1966 Bob Dylan poster, as well as late 1960s publicity posters for the introduction of the Olivetti Valentine typewriter, and logos for DC Comics, Stony Brook University, and Brooklyn Brewery, among others.

In 1954, he co-founded Push Pin Studios, co-founded New York magazine with Clay Felker, and established Milton Glaser, Inc. In 1969, he produced and designed "Short Subject", commonly known as "Mickey Mouse in Vietnam", a short 16mm anti-war film directed by Whitney Lee Savage (father of Adam Savage). His artwork has been featured in exhibits, and placed in permanent collections in many museums worldwide. During his long career he designed many posters, publications and architectural designs. He received many awards for his work, including the National Medal of the Arts award from President Barack Obama in 2009, the first time a graphic designer received this award.

== Early life ==
Milton Glaser was born in The Bronx, New York City. His parents, Eugene and Eleanor (née Bergman), were Hungarian Jewish immigrants. The family resided in the South Bronx. His father owned a dry-cleaning and tailoring shop; his mother was a homemaker. Glaser took drawing classes with artists Raphael and Moses Soyer before attending the High School of Music & Art in Manhattan.

Glaser graduated from the Cooper Union in New York City, took a trip to Italy, and after returning, he founded, Glaser, along with Reynold Ruffins, Seymour Chwast, and Edward Sorel, Push Pin Studios in 1954.

== Career ==
In 1957, the Push Pin Monthly Graphic was sent out to friends and clients. The studio's work rejected tradition and favored "reinvigorated interpretations of historical styles". Glaser and Seymour Chwast directed Push Pin Studios for twenty years, while it became a guiding reference in the world of graphic design. The studio "redefined and expanded the imprimatur of the designer, illustrator, and visual culture at large".

Glaser started his own design firm, Milton Glaser Inc., in 1974 and left Push Pin Studios the following year. In 1983, Glaser formed a partnership with Walter Bernard and established a publication design firm called WBMG in New York City. WBMG has designed more than 50 magazines, newspapers and periodicals around the world.

Over his career, Glaser personally designed and illustrated more than 400 posters. Milton drew heavily from early 20th century artists to create his own signature style that consisted of playful, psychedelic graphics with controlled blasts of colors along with silhouettes and bold geometric outlines. His work is displayed in the Cooper Hewitt National Design Museum, New York; the Victoria and Albert Museum, London; and the Israel Museum, Jerusalem. His work has also been featured in exhibits internationally. He had one-man shows at the Centre Georges Pompidou in Paris and the Museum of Modern Art in New York City.

In 1988, Glaser designed the New York City Shelly Fireman-owned Italianate eatery Trattoria Dell'Arte across from Carnegie Hall.

Glaser was the subject of the 2008 documentary film To Inform and Delight: The World of Milton Glaser. A tribute to Glaser, still working in his 90th year, was published in The New York Times in 2019. That same year, Glaser decided to list his office townhouse at 207 East 32nd Street for sale given his age and deteriorating health. The building was sold for $7.5 million in 2020 to The New York Review of Books.

== Personal life ==
Milton Glaser was the uncle of Gabby Glaser, of the band Luscious Jackson. He was also a first cousin once removed of graphic designer Steven Brower; Glaser was Brower's mother's cousin. He died of a stroke and renal failure in New York City on his 91st birthday.

Glaser's parents were mildly observant Jews, and throughout his life Glaser himself was casually observant, which included fasting on Yom Kippur and hosting an annual Passover seder. Glaser stated that his Jewish background played a part in inspiring his designs, sometimes more than his American background.

He married Shirley Girton on August 11, 1957. His wife also graduated from the Cooper Union.

== Works ==
=== Bob Dylan poster ===
In 1966, Glaser designed a poster for Bob Dylan's Greatest Hits. It was one of Glaser's first posters. The poster depicts the profile of Dylan's face with psychedelic, swirly hair, with "Dylan" written at the bottom in Baby Teeth, one of Glaser's typefaces. His inspiration for the poster was Marcel Duchamp's 1957 Self-portrait; and Art Nouveau, saying "That was an influence for the colors and shapes in the picture." Six million posters have been printed and distributed, and sell for hundreds of dollars as collectibles.

=== I Love New York logo ===
I Love New York logo (1977)

One of Glaser's most recognizable works is his I Love New York logo. In the mid-1970s, New York City's crime rate was up and the city was widely perceived to be dangerous and was on the verge of bankruptcy. In 1977, the State of New York hired advertising agency Wells Rich Greene and Milton Glaser to design a logo to increase tourism. It was Glaser who came up with the design while sitting in the back of a taxi cab on the way to the meeting. The logo consists of the capital "I" and a red heart, stacked on top of the letters "NY" in American Typewriter typeface, symbolizing New York. His inspiration for the logo was Robert Indiana's LOVE design, with the four letters stacked on top of each other. "Glaser loved New York so much that he gave his work to the city for free, hoping it would become public property."

The logo earns New York state $30 million each year and has become a pop culture icon. It is reproduced on everything from coffee cups to T-shirts and hats. The logo can be seen everywhere in New York City. Robert Indiana's work influenced Glaser who in turn has inspired other designers to create variations on the layout, for example "I Heart Radio". The state has filed nearly 3,000 objections against them.

After the September 11 attacks, the logo became even more of a symbol, creating unity between the public. Glaser designed a modified version saying, "I Love New York More Than Ever", in response to the attacks. The red heart has a small blackened and burned area along one edge to symbolize the attack on the World Trade Center site.

The logo is included in MoMA's 2025 exhibition, Pirouette: Turning Points in Design, a collection of "widely recognized design icons [...] highlighting pivotal moments in design history," such as the Bean Bag chair, the Sony Walkman portable cassette player, and the NASA Worm insignia.

=== New York magazine ===
In 1968, Glaser and Clay Felker founded New York magazine. The magazine was aimed at people who enjoyed reading, according to Glaser, "It was about what was happening in New York City at the time." One example of this is "The Underground Gourmet". It was about cheap restaurants in New York. Glaser wrote the column for seven years with Jerome Snyder. It was one of the most popular columns in the magazine. New York "became the model for the city magazines, and stimulated a host of imitations". Glaser left the magazine in 1977. In 1993, thanks to Glaser's history with New York, he was tapped by John F. Kennedy Jr., in conjunction with his partner Michael J. Berman, to work with them to create the image they were seeking for their start-up magazine George.

=== Typography ===
In 1970, Glaser designed his namesake typeface, Glaser Stencil, which drew inspiration from geometric sans-serif fonts such as Futura and Avant Garde.

==== Fonts Designed ====
- Art Decko (Photo Lettering Inc.)
- Babycurls (Photo Lettering Inc.)
- Babyfat (1964, Photo Lettering Inc.)
- Babyteeth (1966, Photo Lettering Inc.)
- Eightway (1964, Photo Lettering Inc.), with George Leavitt
- Einstein (1979)
- Filmsense (1967, Photo Lettering Inc.)
- Futura Stencil (1970, Mergenthaler)
- Glaser Stencil (1970, Mergenthaler)
- Houdini (1969, Photo Lettering Inc.) with George Leavitt and Terry Wüdenbachs
- Kitchen (1977, P22 type foundry), with James Grieshaber
- Push Pin Art Deko (1970, Photo Lettering Inc.)
- Rainbow! (1987, Photo Lettering Inc.)
- Stencil Select (1970, Mergenthaler)

=== Pomilio Blumm ===
In 2019, Glaser redesigned the historical 'rhino' logo of the Italian communication agency Pomilio Blumm. Stemming from this experience, a documentary titled A Social Design Story was produced.

== Awards ==
In 2004, Glaser won a National Design Award Lifetime Achievement from the Cooper-Hewitt National Design Museum for his profound and meaningful long-term contributions to the contemporary practice of design.

In 2009, he was awarded the National Medal of Arts by President Barack Obama and First Lady Michelle Obama at the White House. Glaser is the first graphic designer to have received this award.

Glaser was honored as one of The New Jewish Home's 2015 Eight Over Eighty honorees.

== Logos designs by Glaser ==
Brooklyn Brewery

DC Comics (1977–2005; 2024–current)

LaGuardia High School

Stony Brook University

Stony Brook Southampton

== Publications ==
- Glaser, Milton (1983). Milton Glaser: Graphic Design. New York: The Overlook Press. ISBN 9780879511883.
- Glaser, Milton (2000). Art is Work: Graphic Design, Interiors, Objects and Illustrations. London: Thames & Hudson. ISBN 9781585670697.
- Glaser, Milton; Ilic, Mirko (2005). The Design of Dissent: Socially and Politically Driven Graphics. Massachusetts: Rockport Publishers Inc. ISBN 9781592533077.
- Glaser, Milton (2008). Drawing is Thinking. New York: Abrams. ISBN 9781585679942.
- Glaser, Milton (2012). In Search of the Miraculous, or, One Thing Leads to Another. New York: The Overlook Press. ISBN 9781590207222.
- Glaser, Milton (2020). Sketch and Finish: The Journey from Here to There. Hudson, N.Y.: Princeton Architectural Press. ISBN 9781616899615.

== See also ==
- Introducing Hedzoleh Soundz, a 1973 album by South African trumpeter Hugh Masekela—an example of his coverworks
