= Seymour Chwast =

American graphic designer

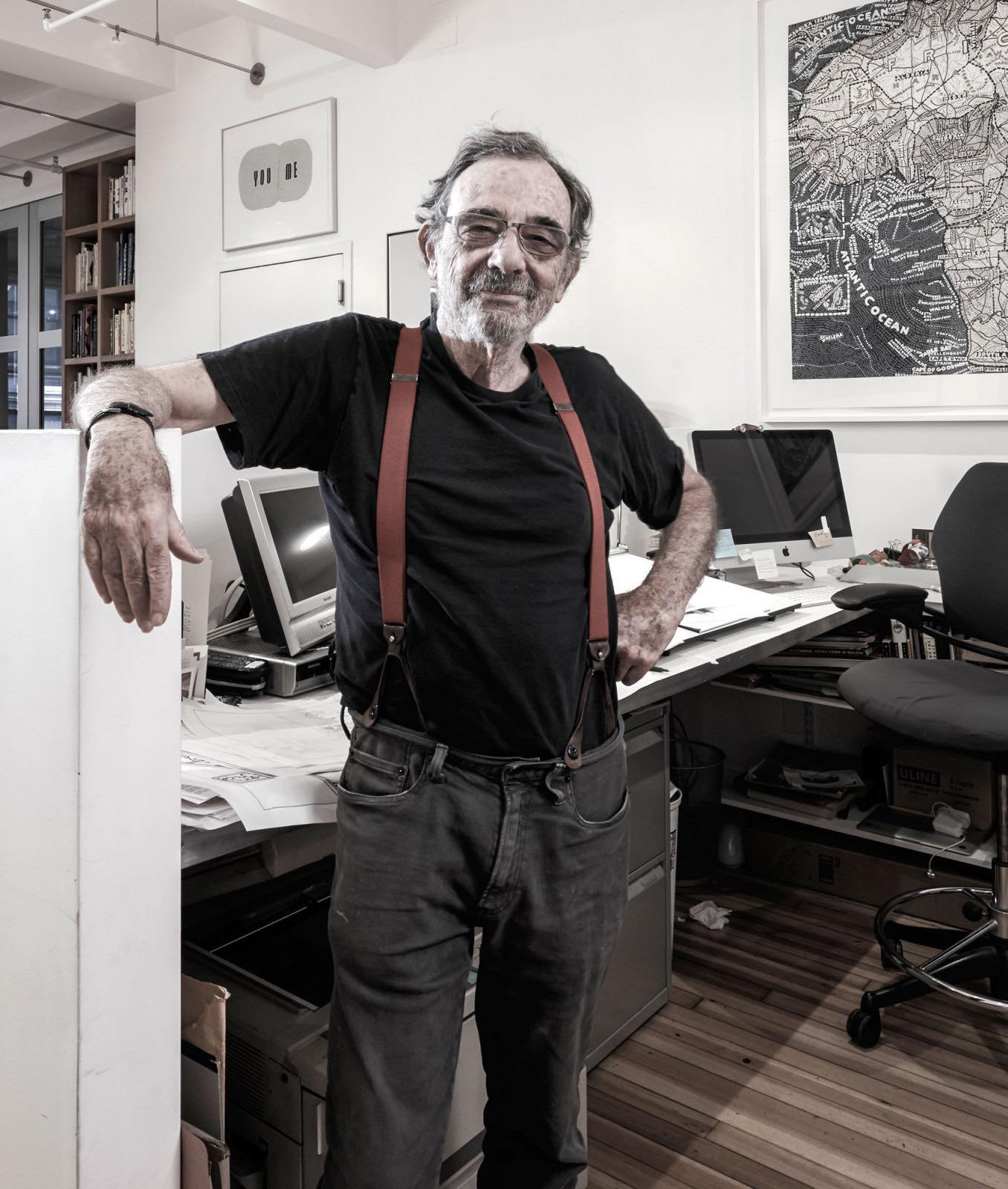
- Born: August 18, 1931 (age 94); The Bronx, New York City, New York, U.S.
- Education: Cooper Union
- Known for: Illustration, Graphic design, Type design
- Spouse: Paula Scher
- Awards: full list

Seymour Chwast (born August 18, 1931) is an American graphic designer, illustrator, and type designer.

== Biography ==
Chwast was born in the Bronx, New York City and in 1948 graduated from Abraham Lincoln High School in Brooklyn where he was introduced to graphic design by his art teacher, Leon Friend. He joined the school's elite art squad (alumni include Gene Federico and Alex Steinweiss). A portfolio was required for entry; he and the club would create on demand including posters, banners, and other materials for school events and social causes. That same year, he published his first illustration (a drawing of himself dancing at a party) in the “It’s All Yours” issue of Seventeen.

In Chwast's commentary on his career he states: "I have a strong suspicion the way I draw—and what I draw—were preordained by the time I was nine years of age."

He graduated with a Bachelor of Fine Arts from Cooper Union in 1951. After graduation, he went on to hold several jobs, which included working on promotional art for the New York Times. He also worked at Esquire magazine, where he reunited with fellow Cooper Union alum Edward Sorel. After both of them were fired in 1954, they founded Push Pin Studios along with Milton Glaser. Reynold Ruffins would join them shortly thereafter. The bi-monthly publication The Push Pin Graphic, a product of their collaboration, was launched in 1957.

1970 showed that American style had reached Europe. “The Push Pin Style,” was a Push Pin Studios exhibition offered by the Musée des Arts Décoratifs, at the Louvre in Paris, France. It was the first time that the Louvre had mounted a show of Graphic Art, and this show then traveled through Europe and to Japan.

Chwast is famous for his commercial artwork, which includes posters, food packaging, magazine covers, and publicity art. Often referred to as "the left-handed designer," Chwast's unique graphic design melded social commentary and a distinctive style of illustration which he refers to as his "Roxy Style". Today, he continues to work and is principal at Pushpin Group, Inc. in New York City.

In 1970, he met Paula Scher during an interview she had with him at Pushpin while she was still a senior at Tyler School of Art. They married in 1973 and divorced five years later. They remarried in 1989. Chwast has two daughters from a previous relationship, Pamela and Eve.

In 1985, he received the AIGA Medal. He is the font designer of Chwast Buffalo, Fofucha, Loose Caboose NF, and Weedy Beasties NF. He is a member of Alliance Graphique International (AGI).In 2023 he was awarded a National Design Award as a Design Visionary by the Smithsonian Design Museum in recognition of his work.

The newest show: "Yes, No, and WOW: The Push Pin Studios Revolution" is the latest retrospective of the group's work spanning the 50s into the 21st Century. It opened October 5, running through December 30, 2025 at The Church in Sag Harbor New York. This exhibit includes posters, books, vinyl record covers, and other objects from the six member artists: Seymour Chwast, Paul Davis, Milton Glaser, James McMullan, Reynold Ruffins and Ed Sorel.

== Fonts designed ==
- Artone (1964, Photo Lettering Inc.)
- Blimp (1970, Photo Lettering Inc.)
- Buffalo (1978, Mergenthaler)
- Filmsense (1970, Photo Lettering Inc.)
- Monograph (1972, Photo Lettering Inc.)
- Myopic (1971, Photo Lettering Inc.)

== Awards ==
- 1972 – Augustus Saint Gaudens Award, The Cooper Union School of Art
- 1983 – Art Directors Hall of Fame
- 1985 – American Institute of Graphic Arts Medal
- 1989 – National Jewish Book Award in the Children's Picture Book category for Just Enough Is Plenty
- 1992 – Honorary Doctorate, Parson's School of Design
- 1997 – Masters Series, School of Visual Arts
- 2011 – Inkpot Award
- 2023 – National Design Award, Cooper Hewitt Design Museum

== Works ==
- Poster Man : 50 Years of Iconic Graphic Design (by Seymour Chwast), Schiffer Publishing, 2021, ISBN 978-0764361227
- Docteur Dolittle (Sztajn Lili, Seymour Chwast, Lili Sztajn, Philippe Bretelle), Helium livres illustrés (French Edition), 2018 ISBN 978-2330090487
- At War with War: 5000 Years of Conquests, Invasions, and Terrorist Attacks, An Illustrated Timeline (by Seymour Chwast, Victor Navasky), Seven Stories Press, 2017 ISBN 978-1609807795
- The Pancake King (By Phyllis La Farge, Illustrated by Seymour Chwast, Ate by Seth Swerine), Princeton Architectural Press, 2016 (ISBN 978-1616894320)
- About Diabetes: Your Guide to Good Health (by Learning About Diabetes Inc., Seymour Chwast), Learning About Diabetes Inc., 2016 ISBN 978-0692670095
- Dr. Dolittle (by Seymour Chwast), Creative Editions, 2015 ISBN 978-1568462585
- Still Another Number Book: A Colorful Counting Book (by Seymour Chwast, Martin Moskof), Dover Publications, 2014 ISBN 978-0486492018
- Still Another Alphabet Book: A Colorful Puzzle & Game Book (by Seymour Chwast, Martin Moskof), Dover Publications, 2014 ISBN 978-0486492001
- Tall City, Wide Country (by Seymour Chwast), Creative Editions, 2013 ISBN 978-1568462288
- Get Dressed! (by Seymour Chwast), Harry N. Abrams, 2012 ISBN 978-1419701078
- Bobo's Smile (by Seymour Chwast), Creative Editions, 2012 ISBN 978-1568462219
- The Odyssey (by Seymour Chwast), Bloomsbury USA, 2012 ISBN 978-1608194865
- Graphic Style: From Victorian to New Century (by Steven Heller, Seymour Chwast), Harry N Abrams Inc, 2011 ISBN 978-0810997912
- The Canterbury Tales (by Seymour Chwast), Bloomsbury USA, 2011 ISBN 978-1608194872
- Dante's Divine Comedy: A Graphic Adaptation (by Seymour Chwast), Bloomsbury Publishing plc, 2010
- Seymour: The Obsessive Images of Seymour Chwast (by Seymour Chwast, Steven Heller, Paula Scher), Chronicle Books, 2009 ISBN 978-0811865463
- Had Gadya: A Passover Song (by Seymour Chwast, Michael Strassfeld), Square Fish, 2009 ISBN 978-0312535704
- Illustration: A Visual History (by Steven Heller, Seymour Chwast), Harry N Abrams, 2008 ISBN 978-0810972841
- She Sells Sea Shells: World Class Tongue Twisters (by Seymour Chwast), Applesauce Press, 2008 ISBN 978-1604330090
- The Push Pin Graphic: A Quarter Century of Innovative Design and Illustration (by Seymour Chwast, introduction by Martin Venezky), Chronicle Books, 2004 ISBN 978-0811841030
- Graphic Style: From Victorian to Digital (by Steven Heller, Seymour Chwast), Harry N Abrams, 2001 ISBN 978-0810929845
- Traffic Jam (by Seymour Chwast), Houghton Mifflin Harcourt, 1999 ISBN 978-0395974957
- The Twelve Circus Rings (by Seymour Chwast), Harcourt Children's Books, 1996 ISBN 978-0152013615
- Goodbye, Hello : Everything You Need to Help Your Child When Your Family Moves, Parenting Packs (by Seymour Chwast) Harry N Abrams Inc, 1997 ISBN 978-1891443008
- Mr. Merlin and the Turtle (by Seymour Chwast), Greenwillow, 1996 ISBN 978-0688146320
- Jackets Required (by Steven Heller, Seymour Chwast), Chronicle Books, 1995 ISBN 978-0811803960
- Bra Fashions By Stephanie (by Seymour Chwast), Warner Books, 1994 ISBN 978-0446670500
- The Alphabet Parade (by Seymour Chwast), Voyager Books, 1994 ISBN 978-0152001155
- Graphic Style: From Victorian to Post-Modern (by Steven Heller, Seymour Chwast), Harry N Abrams, 1994 ISBN 978-0810925885
- Just Enough Is Plenty: A Hanukkah Tale (by Barbara Diamond Goldin and Seymour Chwast), Viking Kestrel, 1988 ISBN 978-0670818525
- Art Against War: Four Hundred Years of Protest in Art (by D. J. R. Bruckner, Seymour Chwast, Steven Heller), Abbeville Press, 1984 ISBN 978-0896593893
- Paper Pets: Make Your Own 3 Dogs, 2 Cats, 1 Parrot, 1 Rabbit, 1 Monkey (by Seymour Chwast), Harry N Abrams Inc 1993 ISBN 978-0810925311
- Trylon and Perisphere: 1939 New York World's Fair (by Barbara Cohen, Steven Heller, Seymour Chwast), Harry N Abrams Inc, 1989 ISBN 978-0810924154
- Italian Futurism & Art Deco (Design & Style, No. 4) (by Steven Heller, Seymour Chwast), Mohawk Paper Mills/The Pushpin Group, 1988
- Sam's Bar (by Seymour Chwast), Doubleday, 1987 ISBN 978-0385242646
- New York Observed: Artists and Writers Look at the City, 1650 to the Present (by Barbara Cohen (ed.), Seymour Chwast (ed.), Steven Heller(ed.)), Harry N Abrams Inc, 1987 ISBN 978-0810923430
- Happy birthday, Bach (by Peter Schickele, Seymour Chwast), Doubleday, 1985 ISBN 978-0385199124
- The Left-Handed Designer (by Steven Heller, Seymour Chwast), Harry N Abrams, 1985 ISBN 978-0810912892
- The Art of New York (by Seymour Chwast, Steven Heller), Harry N. Abrams, 1983 ISBN 978-0810918092
- Amazing Magical Jell-O Desserts (by Seymour Chwast, Arnold Rosenberg), General Foods Corporation, 1977 ISBN 978-0671246495
- Esquire Party Book (by Scotty & Ronnie; Esquire Editors Welch), Esquire/Harper & Row, 1965
