= Feit =

Feit is a German-language surname. Notable people with the surname include:

- Carl Feit, Jewish American cancer research scientist
- Peter Feit (1883–1968), Thai music composer and professor
- Rosemary Feit Covey (born 1954), American printmaker
- Walter Feit (1930–2004), Jewish Austrian-American mathematician

== See also ==
- Feit–Thompson (disambiguation)

=== Related names ===
- Feith (disambiguation)
- Veith, Veit (disambiguation), Veidt
- Veitel, Feitl, etc.
