= Cowden (disambiguation) =

Cowden is a small village and civil parish in the Sevenoaks District of Kent, England.

Cowden may also refer to:

- Cowden, East Riding of Yorkshire, England, which may refer to:
  - Great Cowden
  - Little Cowden, a former town lost due to costal erosion
- Cowden, Illinois, United States
- Cowden railway station, a railway station in Kent

== People with the given name Cowden ==
- Charles Cowden Clarke (1787–1877), English author
- Mary Cowden Clarke (1809–1898), English author

== People with the surname Cowden ==
- Bill Cowden (1920–2007), American basketball player
- George Cowden (born 1930), Texas lawyer and politician
- John Cowden (1917–2006), American television executive
- Lucinda Cowden (born 1965), Australian actress

== See also ==
- Cowden Park House
- Cowden syndrome
- Cowden v. Commissioner, a case in the 1961 United States Court of Appeals
