= Principle of equivalence =

Principle of equivalence may refer to:

- The relativistic equivalence principle
- Carl Jung's second principle relating to the libido#Analytical psychology
- The principle of nuclear equivalence, in genetics
- Wolfram's principle of computational equivalence, discussed in A New Kind of Science

== See also ==
- Doctrine of cash equivalence
