= Wittes (surname) =

Wittes is a surname. It is the surname of:

- Benjamin Wittes (born 1969), American journalist, married to Tamara
- Janet Wittes, American statistician, married to Robert
- Pam and Jon Wittes, American bridge players, 1986 winners of the World Mixed Pairs Championship
- Robert E. Wittes, American physician, married to Janet
- Tamara Cofman Wittes, American foreign policy expert, married to Benjamin
