= William Golden (graphic designer) =

American graphic designer (1911–1959)

- Born: March 31, 1911; Manhattan, New York, United States
- Died: October 23, 1959 (aged 48); Stony Point, New York, United States
- Occupation: Graphic designer
- Employer: CBS

William Golden (March 31, 1911 – October 23, 1959) was an American graphic designer. He is best known as the designer of the CBS logo. He started in the CBS Radio promotion department (before broadcast television existed) and culminating in his tenure as creative director of advertising and sales promotion for CBS Television Network.

== Biography ==
William Golden was born to a Jewish family in lower Manhattan on March 31, 1911, the youngest of twelve children. His only formal schooling was at the Vocational School for Boys, where he learned photoengraving and the basics of commercial design. Upon his graduation from school in 1928, the seventeen-year-old Golden left home and moved to Los Angeles to work for a photoengraving and lithography firm, and while in Los Angeles he also worked in the art department of the Examiner. Golden returned to New York in the early 1930s, where he worked first as a promotional designer for Hearst's Journal American before joining the staff of House & Garden magazine, a production of Condé Nast Publications. While at Condé Nast, Golden met his wife, the graphic designer Cipe Pineles, and came to serve as an apprentice to Dr. Mehemed Fehmy Agha, art director of Condé Nast Publications.

In 1937, Golden left Condé Nast and joined the promotion department at CBS, where he worked for three years before being promoted to art director. Golden's design program went beyond the promotion of CBS as a radio network, producing advertisements that helped to define radio as a news medium. His ads emphasized the ability of radio to bring historic events to its audience in a way no other medium could at that time. Golden took a leave of absence in 1941 to join the Office of War Information in Washington, D.C. In 1943, he entered the U.S. Army as a private, and served in Europe as art director of army training manuals. He was discharged from the military in 1945 with the rank of captain.

Golden returned to CBS as television was growing to become the dominant medium of communication in America. The time was ripe to define a visual style that would identify CBS to its viewers, and William Golden was the chief architect of the CBS identity. His efforts led CBS to a level of visual elegance that reflected the extraordinary taste and intelligence of the corporate leadership and, ultimately, the viewers of CBS. Toward this end, Golden employed the Didot typeface to use as the main type style for CBS promotional materials. Since the typeface was not extensively available in the United States at that time, CBS staff designers George Lois and Kurt Weihs were assigned the task of "Americanizing" the font, redrawing every character in the font from an enlargement that Golden provided to them.

He died on October 23, 1959.

== Accomplishments ==
=== The CBS logo ===
In conjunction with the Didot typeface, Golden developed the famous CBS Eye logo. Kurt Weihs recalled that the eye was inspired by an article in Alexey Brodovitch's Portfolio about the subject of Shaker design.

Among the illustrations was an eye symbol. Golden picked it up and used it for a CBS sales portfolio. Then he felt there was more to it and used it for an ad. ... We had done eyes before. Everybody had done eyes; but this one was something that really worked. I felt the eye could have become the corporate symbol. We saw the eye as symbolizing CBS 'looking at the world.'

— Remington and Hodik, 72

The Eye soon came to be used in all aspects of station identification for CBS Television. Golden observed:

. . . I am grateful that it is such a versatile thing that there seems to be no end to the number of ways it can be used without losing its identity.

— Remington and Hodik, 74

=== Visual form ===
Early in his career at CBS, Golden's work drew the attention of Frank Stanton, who was then the newly named head of the Research Department, and who eventually became the president of CBS. John Cowden, vice president of the CBS Television Network, recalled that Stanton and Golden "shared a common philosophy about their work and in particular about advertising. They were both perfectionists... animated by the conviction that the only possible way for advertising to command attention and be remembered was to present each message so distinctively that it would stand out in relief from all others" (Golden, Weihs, and Strunsky, 130). The two men built a friendship on their shared belief in the effectiveness of good visual form.

Stanton and Golden had a very productive relationship. Stanton gave Golden authority over the image of CBS, believing that design was a high priority within CBS and trusting Golden's sense of visual form. Golden was named creative director of advertising and sales promotion for CBS Television Network in 1951. Because of his friendship with Stanton, Golden was able to set the direction for CBS's promotion and image. Although he frequently submitted designs to Stanton, it was understood that they were not for Stanton to approve or reject, but rather to keep him informed as to what Golden had decided to do.

On one occasion, a layout for a rate card, submitted to the head of Golden's division, came back by messenger with a note saying, 'I don't like it very much. Let's discuss.' Golden's answer was to tape a drawing pencil to the corner of a large layout pad and send it back with this message scribbled across the top sheet: 'Let's not! Why don't you make a better one?' The rate card was produced as originally designed.

— Remington and Hodik, 74

=== Design and corporate decisions ===
Golden helped to shape corporate decisions, pushing the executives to spend more on advertising the shows that demonstrated CBS's respect for good theater, good music, and good news analysis — programs that highlighted CBS's reputation as a responsible company. Although he was offered the position of vice president in charge of advertising and sales promotion at CBS, Golden chose to remain the creative director of advertising and sales promotion, preferring to keep firm control of the creative aspects of the CBS image rather than moving into a more administrative role. However, despite his love for creativity, Golden was keenly aware of the difference between the fine artist and the designer. Asked to define the difference between the two, Golden responded:

I think the fine artist makes a personal statement about his world, and his reactions to his world. He makes it to a limited audience, or to a big audience — but it's all his. He controls every bit of it. The advertising designer has a completely different function. He may be someone who thought he wanted to be a painter — but wasn't. . . . If [the designer is] honest enough, he becomes a professional who can do something special. But this something special is for sale — it is communicating something that is not his own. I think the trouble comes when he tries to make it a work of art, too. I think the two are completely different things. I think a lot of designers, who are talented and intelligent don't find this very satisfying. But they're not going to find it more satisfying by pretending it's something it isn't.

— Golden, Weihs, and Strunsky, 79

== Impact ==
=== The CBS Eye ===
Golden's design helped to highlight the reputation of CBS as a major outlet of world news, and symbolized CBS "looking at the world." Golden designed the eye to be balanced, and used good proportions between the outer circle, the inner circle, and the white space around the "pupil" of the eye. In many advertisements, the white space in the design functioned as negative space while the outer and inner circles were overlaid with a photograph or still-frame from a television program. This is one way in which the simple Eye design could be used over and over to imprint the Eye into the American consciousness as a symbol of CBS, and to tie the CBS corporate identity to the programs that aired on CBS.

=== See? ===
This photo montage ran as a full-page New York Times ad on April 13, 1959. In this ad, Golden selected a wide array of different images from CBS News broadcasts to show the range of topics that CBS had reported on, while simultaneously announcing that CBS had won the Peabody Award for Public Service for the third year in a row. This ad also demonstrates the use of the Didot Bodoni typeface and the Eye logo together, showing the maturity of the CBS identity.

=== Which Way In? and Target ===
These two advertisements ran in Variety in 1954 and 1955. Which Way In? was CBS's answer to which medium was the best format to deliver news to the public. As radio had grown in the preceding 30 years to compete with newspapers and print media, the debate arose as to whether news was more effective in visual format (the printed page) or in audio format (the radio broadcast). CBS's answer was that clearly television was better than both, since it was able to bring you the sound and emotion of the human voice, while simultaneously providing you images (still photos or video clips) that showed you the actual location of the news event. Target was an announcement of CBS's achievement of the goal to deliver their programs to the largest audience at the lowest cost. The CBS network had been the highest-rated network for many years and had been gaining a reputation as the most effective network for advertisers to reach the largest audience.

== Bibliography ==
- Golden, Cipe Pineles, Kurt Weihs, and Robert Strunsky, eds. The visual craft of William Golden. New York: George Braziller, Inc., 1962.
- Remington, R. Roger, and Barbara J. Hodik. Nine Pioneers in American Graphic Design. Cambridge, Massachusetts: Massachusetts Institute of Technology Press, 1989. ISBN 0-262-68076-9.
