= Feito =

Feito is a surname. Notable people with the surname include:

- David Feito (born 1982), Spanish footballer
- Luis Feito (1929–2021), Spanish painter
- Virginia Feito (born 1988), Spanish novelist

== See also ==
- Feit
