= Veit =

Veit is a personal name. Notable people with the name include:

== Surname ==
- Veit (surname)

== Given name ==
- Veit Amerbach, professor of theology and member of Martin Luther's entourage who converted to Catholicism
- Veit Arnpeck (1440–1505), Bavarian historian
- Veit Bach (1550–1578), Hungarian miller who founded the Bach family of composers and musicians
- Veit Erbermann (1597–1675), German theologian and controversialist
- Veit Harlan (1899–1964), German film director and actor
- Veit Heiduschka (born 1938), Austrian film producer
- Veit Ludwig von Seckendorff (1626–1692), German statesman and scholar
- Veit Stoss (1450–1533), German sculptor, mostly in wood
- Johann Georg Veit Engelhardt (1791–1855), German theologian

== See also ==
- Veith, a variant of Veit
- FC St. Veit, Austrian football club founded in 1950
- Veit v. Commissioner, in 1947 and 1949
- Veidt, a surname
- Sankt Veit (disambiguation), several place names
- Vitus (disambiguation), Latin form of Veit
