= Constructive receipt =

For federal income tax purposes, the doctrine of constructive receipt is used to determine when a cash-basis taxpayer has received gross income. Taxpayer are subject to tax in the current year by having unfettered control in determining when items of income will or should be paid. Unlike actual receipt, constructive receipt does not require physical possession of the item of income in question.

== Background ==
The full text of the IRS regulation defining constructive receipt states as follows:

Income although not actually reduced to a taxpayer's possession is constructively received by him in the taxable year during which it is credited to his account, set apart for him, or otherwise made available so that he may draw upon it at any time, or so that he could have drawn upon it during the taxable year if notice of intention to withdraw had been given. However, income is not constructively received if the taxpayer's control of its receipt is subject to substantial limitations or restrictions.

The United States Tax Court more concisely articulated the doctrine of constructive receipt in Davis v. Commissioner. The court stated that for income to be constructively received, the funds must be made available to the taxpayer without substantial limitations. At issue was whether or not a taxpayer faced such substantial limitations when a check was available to her at the post office on the last day of the tax year after the mail carrier attempted to deliver the certified letter containing it to her home earlier the same day. The taxpayer was not at home when the first delivery attempt was made and the carrier left a note that the letter would be at the post office for her. The taxpayer retrieved the check from the post office several days later, just after the new tax year began. Courts had previously held that when a taxpayer makes a decision to be unavailable to take delivery of a check, then he will not satisfy the substantial limitations requirement and he will be deemed to have had constructive receipt at the time of attempted delivery. However, in this case, the court noted that the check sender specifically informed the taxpayer on a prior occasion that the check would be arriving approximately two months later than it actually did. The taxpayer had no notice to expect that the check would be delivered; therefore she could not have made a decision to be unavailable to take receipt. The court held that this lack of notice, under the circumstances, meant that she faced substantial limitations on the availability of the funds and that they were not constructively received during the first tax year.

== History ==
The Tax Court had previously addressed this issue in Hornung v. Commissioner. Paul Hornung, a football player for the Green Bay Packers, won a Corvette as a prize on December 31, 1961, for his performance in the 1961 NFL Championship Game. The game was played in Green Bay, Wisconsin, the car was kept at a dealership in New York City, and Hornung did not retrieve the car until January 3, 1962. The court decided that Hornung had not constructively received the car (income) in 1961 because, under the circumstances, it would have been unreasonable to expect him to retrieve the car on the day he won it.

The Tax Court also addressed constructive receipt in two cases, both entitled Veit v. Commissioner. In Veit I, as part of redoing his employment contract, the taxpayer agreed to defer receiving a bonus that he was owed until the next year. The Tax Court upheld the agreement over the IRS's protest because it was the result of an arm's length business transaction, not a sham to evade paying taxes for a year. Indeed, the deferral was requested by the taxpayer's employer. In Veit II, the Tax Court upheld a subsequent agreement by which the taxpayer would receive five equal payments over the course of five years, rather than the one lump-sum payment previously agreed-upon. Again, the IRS objected to the deferral, and again, the Tax Court found for the taxpayer. The deferral was requested by the employer, and the full amount of the bonus was never "unqualifiedly subject to [the taxpayer's] demand or withdrawal."

== Impact ==
The doctrine of constructive receipt is often used in combination with the doctrine of cash equivalence in order to determine the timing of receipt of income items. A constructive receipt issue arises when the taxpayer has not actually received the income, and the issue is whether the income is substantially available to the taxpayer such that receipt will occur for tax timing purposes. A cash equivalence issue occurs when a taxpayer receives a payment as some sort of promise to pay, and the issue is whether the promise is sufficiently definite as to be considered equivalent to receipt of cash income.
