= Queen's Arms =

Queen's Arms may refers to:

- Queen's Arms, Birmingham, England
- Queen's Arms, Cowden Pound, Kent, England
- Queen's Arms, Patricroft, Greater Manchester, England
