= Cowden v. Commissioner =

Landmark US lawsuit

- Court: United States Court of Appeals for the Fifth Circuit
- Full case name: Frank Cowden, Sr. and wife Gladys Cowden v. Commissioner of Internal Revenue
- Decided: April 12, 1961
- Citation: 289 F.2d 20

Court membership
- Judges sitting: Elbert Tuttle, Richard Rives, Warren Leroy Jones

Case opinions
- Majority: Jones, joined by a unanimous court

Laws applied
- Internal Revenue Code

Keywords
- Constructive receipt

Cowden v. Commissioner, 289 F.2d 20 (5th Cir. 1961), outlined the factors used to determine whether something received is a cash equivalent, in other words, whether something received is taxable when it was received or when it was assigned. The court observed two main doctrines in determining when something is taxable. The court relied on the doctrines of constructive receipt and cash equivalence while reiterating that substance rather than form should control income tax laws.

== Background ==
The taxpayers made a contract for oil and gas royalty payments with "bonuses" payable in two subsequent years. They next signed these contracts over to a bank reporting the amounts received as long term capital gains. The Commissioner disagreed as to their designation making them taxable as capital gains.

=== Procedural history ===
The Commissioner found the “bonus” payments to be taxable at the time they were created and assigned to the extent of their fair market value subject to depletion, computed by applying a four percent discount.

The Tax Court found the "bonus" payments to be taxable at their full face value in the year of the agreement and at ordinary income rates (no depletion). The taxpayer appeals this judgment.

== Decision ==
Previous case law seemed to imply that only obligations represented by negotiable instruments were cash equivalent. The court rejects this argument, that no obligation can be found to be a cash equivalent unless there is a negotiable instrument, as too unrealistic and formalistic. In addition, the court found that a promissory note is not necessarily a cash equivalent. The court then identified the following factors to consider when deciding if something is a cash equivalent:

- unconditional promise to pay;
- promisor is solvent when the note is delivered;
- assignable;
- not subject to set-off;
- readily marketable; and
- not too risky

When you have a negotiable instrument, you look at the above factors to determine if it is a cash equivalent. If the instrument IS a cash equivalent then it is taxable as if cash were received by the taxpayer instead of an obligation.

The court remanded the case to determine whether the “bonus” obligations were cash equivalents and therefore taxable in the year they were assigned.

== See also ==
- Tax accounting
