= Davis v. Commissioner (constructive receipt) =

- Court: United States Tax Court
- Full case name: Beatrice Davis v. Commissioner of Internal Revenue
- Citations: T.C. Memo. 1978-12; 37 T.C.M. (CCH) 42 (1978)

Court membership
- Judge sitting: Howard A. Dawson, Jr.

Case opinions
- Decision by: Dawson

Laws applied
- Internal Revenue Code

Keywords
- Constructive receipt

Davis v. Commissioner, T.C. Memo. 1978-12 (1978), was a case in which the United States Tax Court held that in order to have constructive receipt, a taxpayer must have notice of the attempt to transfer funds to the taxpayer.

== Importance ==
The US tax code treats every tax year separately. It is important to determine exactly when income should be attributed to a taxpayer because that will determine in which tax year they must report the income on their tax return. It is usually better for taxpayers to be able to say that they received income in the second of two years, rather than the first, because they will be able defer paying taxes on that amount for a longer period of time. In order to limit the ability of taxpayers to manipulate the timing of their income, courts have recognized the constructive receipt doctrine, which will attribute income received by a taxpayer to the year in which they had the ability to receive it. This case is an example of a court deciding what circumstances need to be present for constructive receipt to exist.

== Facts ==
A taxpayer was owed severance pay from her employer following a merger. The employer notified the taxpayer in late 1974 that the severance pay would be mailed to her sometime early in 1975. Without further communicating with the taxpayer, the employer mailed her severance check in a certified letter on December 30, 1974. A postal carrier attempted to deliver the letter to the taxpayer's residence on December 31, 1974, but finding her not at home, left a note that the letter would be available for her pick-up at the local post office anytime after 3:00pm that day. The taxpayer returned home after 5:00pm that day, after the post office was closed, and discovered the note. She retrieved the letter from the post office on January 2, 1975. She did not include the severance amount on her 1974 tax return. The IRS challenged this omission, claiming that she had constructively received the check in 1974.

== Issue ==
Did the taxpayer have constructive receipt of the check in 1974?

== Decision ==
The Tax court had to decide whether the taxpayer had the ability receive the check or whether she faced "substantial limitations" on this ability as a result of the circumstances. The Tax Court noted prior decisions that held a taxpayer to have constructively received funds as of the time of attempted delivery when the taxpayer made a decision to be unavailable to receive that delivery. In this case, the court decided that this was not a conscious decision on the part of the taxpayer to be unavailable. The court held that the taxpayer did not have notice of the attempted delivery and that lack of such notice, under these circumstances created substantial limitations to her control over the funds.

== Implications ==
In siding with the taxpayer in this case, the court was essentially saying that where taxpayers have no reason to expect payment, their decisions to be unavailable to take delivery will not trigger constructive receipt if they do not have notice. However, courts will continue to attribute income to taxpayers at the time that they make a conscious decision to "turn their back" upon it.
