= Feith =

Feith is a surname. Notable people with the surname include:

- Constant Feith (1884–1958), Dutch athlete
- Douglas J. Feith (born 1953), American official
- Greg Feith (born 1957), Air Safety Investigator with the NTSB
- Herbert Feith (1930–2001), Australian academic and scholar of Indonesian politics
- Pieter Feith (born 1945), Dutch diplomat
- Rhijnvis Feith (1753–1824), Dutch poet

== See also ==
- Feit
