= Robert E. Wittes =

Oncologist

Robert E. Wittes was Physician-in-Chief of Memorial Sloan-Kettering Cancer Center, from 2002 until December 31, 2012. Prior to his appointment at MSKCC, he was Deputy Director for Extramural Sciences and Director of the Division of Cancer Treatment and Diagnosis at the National Cancer Institute, where he oversaw NCI's extramural clinical and basic research programs, including the evaluation of new therapeutics, diagnostics, and translational research. Wittes is a fellow of the American College of Physicians, a member of the American Association for Cancer Research, the American Society of Clinical Oncology, and the American Federation for Medical Research. In addition to his institutional affiliations, Dr. Wittes has served as editor-in-chief of the Journal of the National Cancer Institute and Oncology. He has served on the editorial boards of Clinical Cancer Research, Current Opinion in Oncology, The American Journal of Clinical Oncology; Cancer Investigation, and The International Journal of Radiation Oncology-Biology & Physics, among others.

== Biography ==
Wittes graduated from Harvard College in 1964 with a degree in chemistry and physics. He graduated cum laude from Harvard Medical School in 1968. He completed an internship and residency in medicine at Beth Israel Hospital in Boston. After starting a medical oncology fellowship at MSKCC in 1972, he served as Assistant Chief of the Solid Tumor Service for a decade. He transitioned to the National Cancer Institute in 1983 as head of the Cancer Therapy Evaluation Program. He became Director of the Division of Cancer Treatment and Diagnosis in 1995, to lead the NCI's programs in drug discovery and development, clinical trials, diagnostic imaging, radiotherapy, and molecular diagnosis. When he assumed the additional role of Deputy Director for Extramural Science in 1997, he became responsible for the oversight, integration, coordination and enhanced communication across all extramural programs of the National Cancer Institute. While at the NCI, Dr. Wittes was instrumental in establishing CancerNet, and the cancer clinical trials website, which offer the general public and health care professionals information about cancer, treatment and clinical trials. He also established NCI's Office of Cancer Complementary and Alternative Medicine in 1998.

As Physician-in-Chief at MSKCC beginning in 2002, Wittes presided over a period of above average growth in both its clinical and research programs. His accomplishments as Physician-in-Chief at MSKCC include the establishment of the Human Oncology and Pathogenesis Program, the Survivorship Initiative, and the Quality of Care Initiative. He also oversaw the construction of new clinical facilities that have enhanced the center's programs in Surgery, Pathology, Pediatrics, Imaging, and the treatment of a full range of cancers.

== Honors and awards ==
Vincent Astor Chair of Clinical Research – July 17, 2003 to 2012 The Geoffrey Beene Cancer Research Center 2010 Progress Report, Page 3 Memorial Sloan-Kettering Cancer Center

NIH Director’s Award – July 11, 2001 The National Institutes of Health Annual Director's Awards Ceremony 2001, Page 8

Public Health Service Distinguished Service Medal – June 22, 2000.

== Personal life ==
Wittes is married to statistician Janet Wittes.
