= St Mary Magdalene, Cowden =

Church of St Mary Magdalene
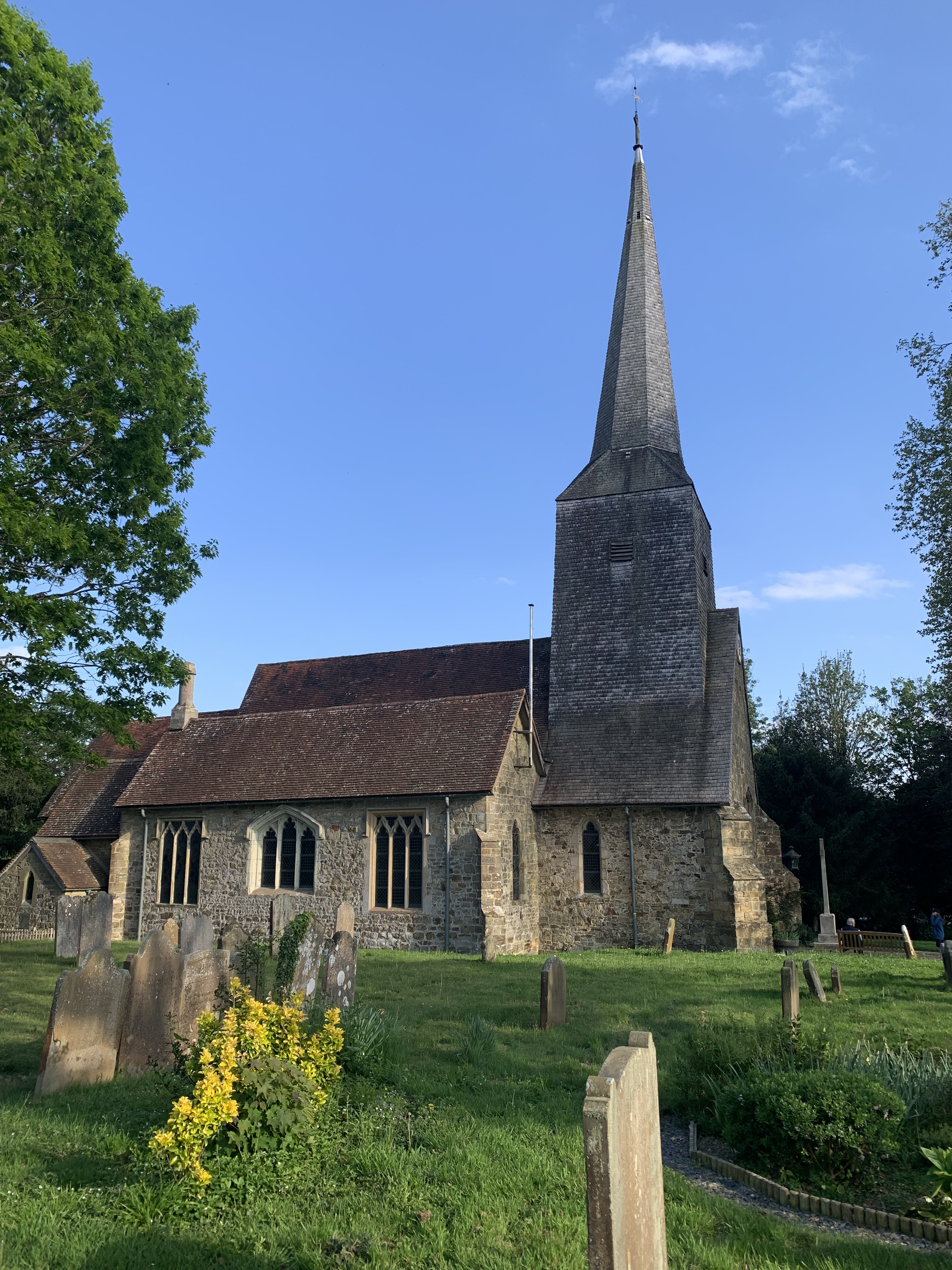
- The Church of St Mary Magdalene, Cowden

- Location within Kent
- 51.1447°N 0.0948°E
- OS grid reference: TQ 46621 40472
- Location: Cowden, Kent, England
- Country: England
- Denomination: Church of England
- Churchmanship: Broad Church

History
- Status: Parish church

Architecture
- Functional status: Active

Administration
- Province: Canterbury
- Diocese: Chichester
- Archdeaconry: Hastings
- Deanery: Rotherfield
- Parish: Cowden

Clergy
- Vicar: Rev. Stephen Hills

The Church of St Mary Magdalene is a parish church in the village of Cowden, in the district of Sevenoaks, Kent, England. It is part of the Church of England and falls within the Diocese of Chichester, the only parish church in Kent to do so. Although historically associated with Sussex, Cowden lies on the Kent–Sussex border and is officially in Kent.

== History ==
=== Norman Origins ===
The church has its origins in the Norman period, with the earliest parts of the building dating to the 13th century. The church is dedicated to Mary Magdalene, a disciple of Jesus who is traditionally associated with penitence and devotion. The Church was constructed from local sandstone with a traditional nave and chancel layout, as well as a distinctive wooden shingled spire. The west tower is capped with a slender broach spire, a typical feature of medieval parish churches in this area.

The interior of the church features timber beams, a carved wooden pulpit, and memorials to local families. There are a number of brass and stone monuments, some dating back to the 16th century.

=== 17th Century ===
The church contains a notable carved timber pulpit, dating to 1628, which includes a polygonal drum with rusticated panelling. The pulpit retains its back plate and a hexagonal sounding board with a substantial finial.

=== 19th century ===
The church has undergone various restorations over the centuries, most notably in the 19th century when significant Victorian restoration took place. The North aisle was built in 1838 to designs by H Whichord. The North East vestry was added in 1884 to designs by WO Milne.

=== Modern era ===
The church organ was installed in the early 20th century and restored in the 1990s. The spire was damaged during World War II and was subsequently repaired. There were further repairs to the church in the Twentieth Century and early Twenty First Century.

The church retains many of its medieval features, including a 14th-century font and fragments of original stained glass.

On 5 August 1976 St Mary's became a Grade II* listed building, recognised for its architectural and historic significance, including the quality of the timber-framed tower and the retention of medieval fabric.

== Churchyard ==
The surrounding churchyard contains several ancient yew trees and a number of historic gravestones. It remains in use for burials and is maintained by the local parish.

== Services and Community ==
The church holds regular Sunday services and plays an active role in the community life of Cowden. It is part of a benefice with nearby parishes and supports a range of events, including musical concerts, seasonal fairs, and village gatherings.

== See also ==
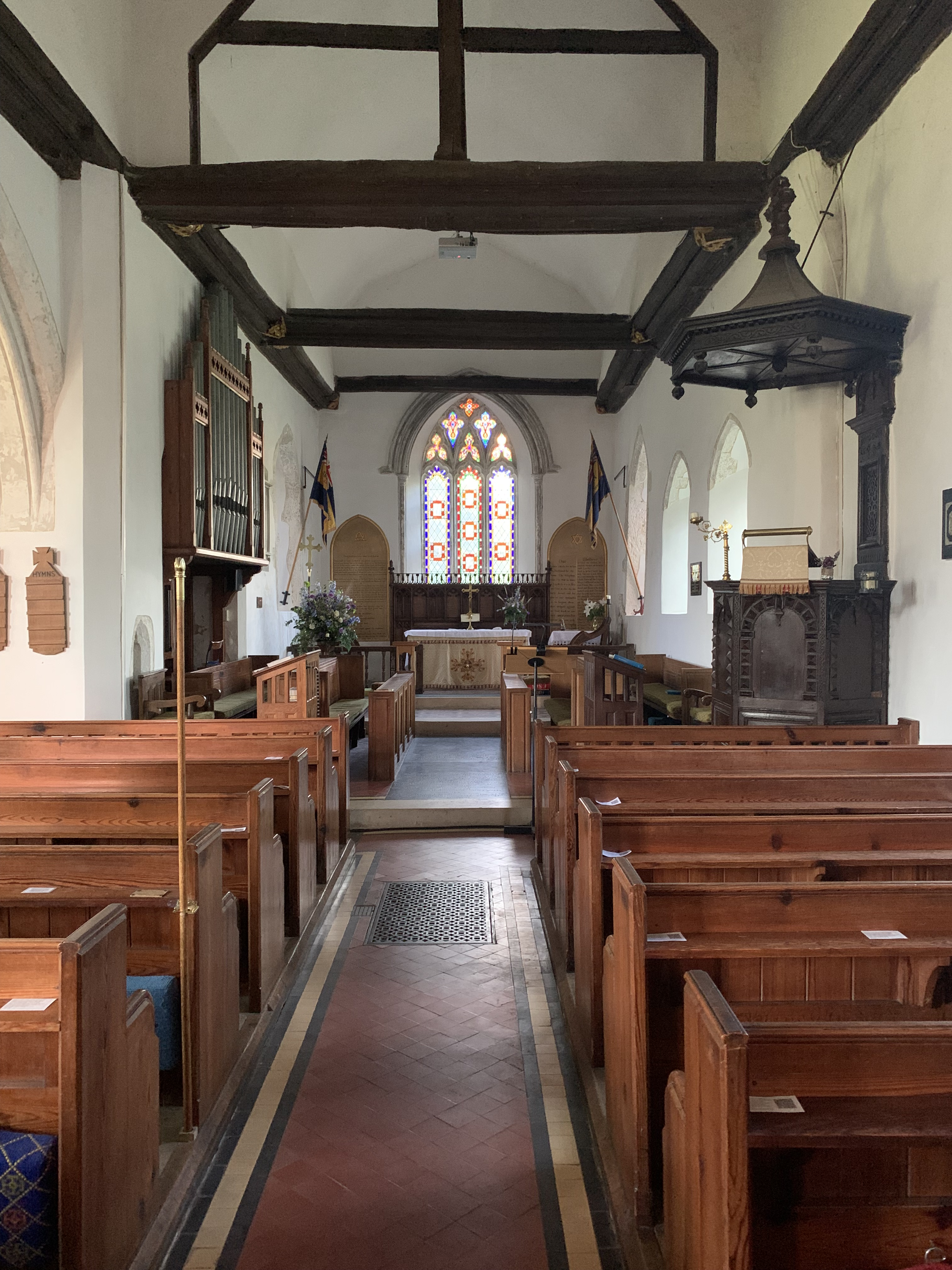
Church of St Mary Magdalene, Cowden, Interior

- List of churches in Kent
- Grade II* listed buildings in Kent
