= Carl Feit =

American medical researcher

Carl Feit is a noted cancer research scientist and occupant of the Dr. Joseph and Rachel Ades Chair in Health Sciences at Yeshiva University. He has served as Chairman of the Science Division of Yeshiva College since 1985. Prior to that he was a research scientist at The Laboratory of Immunodiagnosis at the Sloan-Kettering Institute for Cancer Research. Feit also serves on the editorial board of Cancer Investigation.

== Religion ==
Feit is an Orthodox Jew. He is also a Talmudic scholar and has lectured and taught Talmud classes for many years. He is a founding member of the International Society for Science and Religion.

== Essays and papers ==
- "A Reveal but Hidden God" in God for the 21st Century, Russell Stannard ed., Templeton Foundation Press, 2000, ISBN 1-890151-39-4

== Yeshiva University ==
In addition to his duties as Chairman of the Science Division, Feit also taught an introductory Biology course. He retired from Yeshiva University in 2016.
