= Mehemed Fehmy Agha =

Ukrainian-born Turkish designer and art director

Dr. Mehemed Fehmy Agha (Mykolayiv, March 11, 1896 - Pennsylvania, May 1978) was a Russian-born Turkish designer, art director, and pioneer of modern American publishing. He was instrumental in defining the role of the magazine art director and delivering the full force of European avant garde experimentation to the pages of Vogue, Vanity Fair, and House & Garden, the Condé Nast publishing company's flagship magazines in the United States. §

== Early life and education ==
Agha was born in the Russian Empire (now Ukraine) to parents Yossouf Agha and Anna Khoroz into a family of Turkish descent. He obtained an economics degree at the Emperor Peter the Great Polytechnic Institute in Kiev and a special degree from the National School of Modern Oriental Languages in Paris. Agha then started furthering his skills in the arts, specifically photography, typography, and the sciences.

== Career ==
Raoul Duffy cover for Vanity Fair

Agha introduced the double page spread and bleed photos by 1930

Through his work at both the Paris and Berlin editions of Vogue, Agha became known to Condé Nast who liked Agha's "sense of order, taste and invention," When Agha arrived at Vogue's New York City offices in 1929, he ignited a design revolution when he revamped the magazine—as well as its sister publications Vanity Fair and House & Garden.

== Development and theory ==
In fashion publications, Agha adjusted the graphics, simplified layout and imposed a close relationship between text and images. Agha stripped down Vogue's old-fashioned appearance, favoring Art Deco curves and the clean lines of Constructivism. He traded italic lettering for forward-leaning sans serif fonts like Futura, and removed all extraneous design elements from the pages—the borders around photos, column rules, sidebars—while synchronizing the magazine's look with the latest out of avant-garde Europe. During his career, Agha widened Vogue's margins to such an extent that the white space on either side of the page left enough “room for your laundry list," as one wit put it. He designed the first ever double-page spreads, and the first full-bleed images, printing photographs without any borders at all, right over the edge of the page. Agha also involved himself in every aspect of the editorial process. Beyond good design, “you must get modern material first if you intend to publish a really modern magazine," he said in 1930. Vanity Fair's urbane editor, Frank Crowninshield, noted that Agha expanded so rapidly that “an additional floor had to be engaged in the Graybar Building in order to prevent him from bulging out of the windows, growing through the roof, or occupying the elevator shafts.” His responsibilities soon came to include Vanity Fair, as well as, the home-style journal House & Garden. Agha incorporated photographs by Edward Steichen, Carl Van Vechten, and Edward Weston, as well as the pictorial feature.

In 1943 Agha left and became a graphic arts consultant. He served as president of the Art Directors Club (1935) and AIGA (1953–55). In a tribute published by PM Magazine in August 1939, William Golden wrote about the lofty expectations Agha placed on his designers: "Agha's demands seem so simple. Make something legible, present it logically and make it look somehow luxurious... in a way that he will like. So they devise not merely one version of how they think a page should look, but ten, or twenty, or forty... And for sheer productivity this method is unequalled. As for those bales of rejected layouts that have never seen the light of day; I don't think they are completely wasted. Some day, a less jaded scholar of the Graphic Arts will unearth them and discover again the amazing amount of original and exciting work that was stimulated by the man who knew too much to like anything."—DP

== Contributors ==
1934–1942. "M. F. Agha." Dr. Leslie Project. http://www.drleslie.com/Contributors/agha.shtml.

Hall of Fame 1972. "M. F. Agha." The Art Directors Club. http://www.adcglobal.org/archive/hof/1972/?id=293.

"The Man Who Knew Too Much," by William Golden. PM Magazine. Vol. 5, no. 2 (Aug./Sept. 1939).http://library.rit.edu/gda/content/educational
