= Listed buildings in Cowden =

Civil Parish in Kent, England

Cowden is a village and civil parish in the Sevenoaks District of Kent, England. It contains one grade I, three grade II* and 47 grade II listed buildings that are recorded in the National Heritage List for England.

This list is based on the information retrieved online from Historic England.

== Key ==
Grade	Criteria
I	Buildings that are of exceptional interest
II*	Particularly important buildings of more than special interest
II	Buildings that are of special interest

== Listing ==
Name	Grade	Location	Type	Completed (Note: The date given is the date used by Historic England as significant for the initial building or that of an important part in the structure's description.)	Date designated	Grid ref. (Note: The grid reference is based on the British national grid reference system, sometimes known as OSGB36, used by the Ordnance Survey.) Geo-coordinates	Notes	Entry number (Note: The "List Entry Number" is a unique number assigned to each listed building and scheduled monument by Historic England.)	Image	Wikidata
Clays Barn	II				9 September 1987	TQ4510940713; 51°08′50″N 0°04′24″E		1272493	Upload Photo	Q26562326
Glover's Hawes	II	Butterwell Hill			16 January 1975	TQ4699741006; 51°08′58″N 0°06′01″E		1261611	Upload Photo	Q26552546
Upper Pryors	II	Butterwell Hill			16 January 1975	TQ4692641138; 51°09′02″N 0°05′58″E		1336392	Upload Photo	Q26620884
Church of St Mary Magdalene	I	Church Street			10 September 1954	TQ4662140472; 51°08′41″N 0°05′41″E		1085906	Church of St Mary Magdalene More images	Q17529838
Friendly Green	II	Cowden Cross			16 January 1975	TQ4719641347; 51°09′09″N 0°06′12″E		1253826	Upload Photo	Q26545547
Hole Cottage	II	Falconhurst Wood			16 January 1975	TQ4721842141; 51°09′35″N 0°06′14″E		1085924	Upload Photo	Q26374933
Basing	II	Furnace Lane			10 September 1954	TQ4378540178; 51°08′34″N 0°03′15″E		1085907	Upload Photo	Q26374845
Furnace Mill House	II	Furnace Lane			10 September 1954	TQ4551139923; 51°08′24″N 0°04′43″E		1336393	Upload Photo	Q26620885
Scarlets	II	Furnace Lane			10 September 1954	TQ4432440134; 51°08′32″N 0°03′42″E		1253830	Upload Photo	Q26545551
Crippenden Manor House	II*	Gillridge Lane, Crippenden Manor			10 September 1954	TQ4471541736; 51°09′24″N 0°04′05″E		1253834	Crippenden Manor House More images	Q17545705
Barn to South of Pile Gate Farmhouse	II	Hartfield Road			16 January 1975	TQ4676741806; 51°09′24″N 0°05′50″E		1261586	Upload Photo	Q26552522
Cole Allen	II	Hartfield Road			16 January 1975	TQ4630942813; 51°09′57″N 0°05′28″E		1253845	Upload Photo	Q26545561
Heathen Street Cottage	II	Hartfield Road			16 January 1975	TQ4616443087; 51°10′06″N 0°05′21″E		1085909	Upload Photo	Q26374856
Kent Water House	II	Hartfield Road			10 September 1954	TQ4733840693; 51°08′48″N 0°06′18″E		1085910	Upload Photo	Q26374860
Pile Gate Farmhouse	II	Hartfield Road			16 January 1975	TQ4673941836; 51°09′25″N 0°05′49″E		1085908	Upload Photo	Q26374850
Queens Arms	II	Hartfield Road			28 July 1999	TQ4629442554; 51°09′49″N 0°05′27″E		1387747	Queens Arms More images	Q18161326
Southlands	II	Hartfield Road			16 January 1975	TQ4712940784; 51°08′51″N 0°06′08″E		1253851	Upload Photo	Q26545567
10, High Street	II	10, High Street			16 January 1975	TQ4654240486; 51°08′42″N 0°05′37″E		1253871	Upload Photo	Q26545586
13 and 15, High Street	II	13 and 15, High Street			16 January 1975	TQ4654040461; 51°08′41″N 0°05′37″E		1085917	Upload Photo	Q26374896
18, High Street	II	18, High Street			10 September 1954	TQ4650040460; 51°08′41″N 0°05′35″E		1085914	Upload Photo	Q26374880
2, High Street	II	2, High Street			10 September 1954	TQ4656740500; 51°08′42″N 0°05′38″E		1362078	Upload Photo	Q26644008
6a and 6b, High Street	II	6a and 6b, High Street			16 January 1975	TQ4655740490; 51°08′42″N 0°05′38″E		1085911	Upload Photo	Q26374864
7-11, High Street	II	7-11, High Street			16 January 1975	TQ4656040465; 51°08′41″N 0°05′38″E		1085937	Upload Photo	Q26374996
8, High Street	II	8, High Street			16 January 1975	TQ4654940488; 51°08′42″N 0°05′37″E		1085912	Upload Photo	Q26374870
Chandler House the Cowden Stores	II	14, High Street			10 September 1954	TQ4651840474; 51°08′41″N 0°05′36″E		1085913	Upload Photo	Q26374875
Fountain Cottage	II	26, High Street			16 January 1975	TQ4647840426; 51°08′40″N 0°05′34″E		1261573	Upload Photo	Q26552509
Gottyshill	II	High Street			16 January 1975	TQ4613840280; 51°08′35″N 0°05′16″E		1253893	Upload Photo	Q26545602
Medway Cottage Medway House	II	High Street			16 January 1975	TQ4651740451; 51°08′40″N 0°05′36″E		1085918	Upload Photo	Q26374901
Paris House	II	16, High Street			10 September 1954	TQ4651040469; 51°08′41″N 0°05′35″E		1261564	Upload Photo	Q26552504
Post House the Post Office	II	19, High Street			16 January 1975	TQ4652840458; 51°08′41″N 0°05′36″E		1336395	Upload Photo	Q26620887
Rose Cottage	II	High Street			16 January 1975	TQ4648740370; 51°08′38″N 0°05′34″E		1085915	Upload Photo	Q26374885
School Buildings with Teacher's House Behind	II	High Street			16 January 1975	TQ4643940282; 51°08′35″N 0°05′31″E		1336396	Upload Photo	Q26620888
Brook Farmhouse	II	Horseshoe Green			16 January 1975	TQ4780741941; 51°09′27″N 0°06′44″E		1253943	Upload Photo	Q26545650
Horseshoe Cottage	II	Horseshoe Green			16 January 1975	TQ4792642123; 51°09′33″N 0°06′51″E		1336400	Upload Photo	Q26620891
Horseshoe Green Farmhouse	II	Horseshoe Green			16 January 1975	TQ4795642305; 51°09′39″N 0°06′52″E		1253936	Upload Photo	Q26545644
Wickens	II	Horseshoe Green, Wickens			16 January 1975	TQ4831541525; 51°09′14″N 0°07′10″E		1085925	Upload Photo	Q26374938
Oast Building to South East of Scarlets	II	Lingfield Road			16 January 1975	TQ4435140103; 51°08′31″N 0°03′44″E		1085919	Upload Photo	Q26374906
Old Buckhurst	II	Mark Beech, TN8 5PH, Markbeech			16 January 1975	TQ4839842768; 51°09′54″N 0°07′16″E		1085926	Upload Photo	Q26374943
Barn to North East of Bassetts Farmhouse	II	Moat Lane, Bassets Farm			16 January 1975	TQ4954641302; 51°09′05″N 0°08′13″E		1085905	Upload Photo	Q26374840
Bassetts Farmhouse	II*	Moat Lane, Bassets Farm			10 September 1954	TQ4952841289; 51°09′05″N 0°08′12″E		1252534	Bassetts Farmhouse More images	Q17545695
Bassetts Old Barn	II	Moat Lane			23 March 1987	TQ4936241188; 51°09′02″N 0°08′03″E		1244192	Upload Photo	Q26536824
Barn to North West of Waystrode Manor	II	Spode Lane, Waystrode Manor			16 January 1975	TQ4597140598; 51°08′46″N 0°05′08″E		1085921	Upload Photo	Q26374916
Leighton Manor Farmhouse	II	Spode Lane, Leighton Manor Farm			10 September 1954	TQ4532241394; 51°09′12″N 0°04′35″E		1085922	Upload Photo	Q26374920
Ludwells Farmhouse	II	Spode Lane, Ludwells Farm			16 January 1975	TQ4544341714; 51°09′22″N 0°04′42″E		1336398	Upload Photo	Q26620889
Priors Croft	II	Spode Lane			16 January 1975	TQ4642540675; 51°08′48″N 0°05′31″E		1085920	Upload Photo	Q26374911
Waystrode Manor	II*	Spode Lane, Waystrode Manor			10 September 1954	TQ4599240584; 51°08′45″N 0°05′09″E		1336397	Waystrode Manor More images	Q17545909
Elylands	II	Stick Hill, Edenbridge, TN8 5NL			16 January 1975	TQ4631443146; 51°10′08″N 0°05′29″E		1336394	Upload Photo	Q26620886
Barn to North of Priors Cottage	II	The Square			16 January 1975	TQ4663740521; 51°08′43″N 0°05′42″E		1336399	Upload Photo	Q26620890
Gainsford House	II	The Square			10 September 1954	TQ4655940511; 51°08′42″N 0°05′38″E		1253927	Upload Photo	Q26545636
No 4 and Stable Building	II	1, The Square			10 September 1954	TQ4657340515; 51°08′43″N 0°05′39″E		1253932	Upload Photo	Q26545641
The Crown Inn	II	The Square			10 September 1954	TQ4657940536; 51°08′43″N 0°05′39″E		1085923	The Crown Inn More images	Q26374926

== See also ==
- Grade I listed buildings in Kent
- Grade II* listed buildings in Kent

== Sources ==
- Newman, John (2012) [1969], Kent: West and the Weald, The Buildings of England, New Haven and London: Yale University Press, ISBN 978-0-300-18509-6
