= Queen's Arms, Cowden Pound =

Listed pub in Kent, England

Queen's Arms
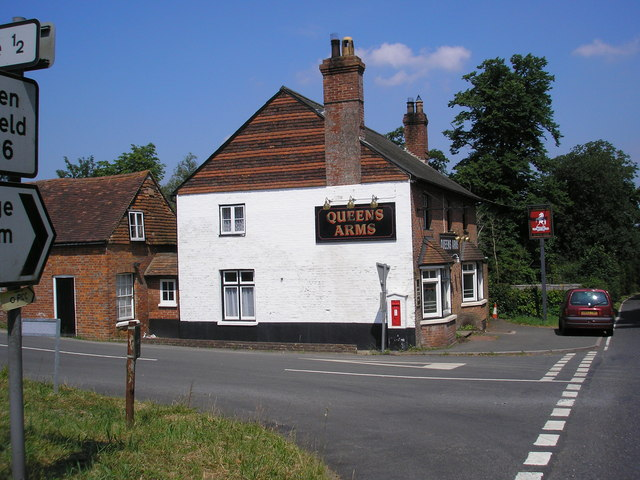
- The pub in 2006

- Location within Kent
- Alternative names: Annie's; Elsie's

General information
- Type: Public house
- Location: Hartfield Road, Cowden, Kent, England
- Coordinates: 51°09′49″N 0°05′27″E
- Named for: Queen's Own Royal West Kent Regiment
- Year built: Mid-19th century
- Renovated: 1953 (extended)
- Client: William Longley
- Owner: Independent

Design and construction
- Designations

Listed Building – Grade II
- Official name: Queens Arms
- Designated: 28 July 1999
- Reference no.: 1387747

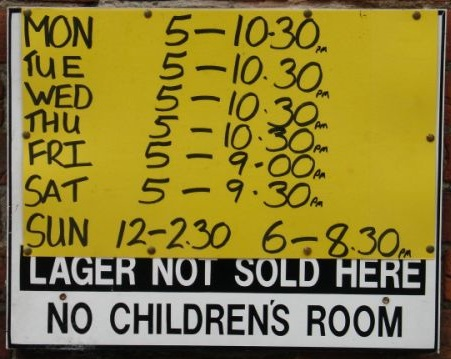
The pub sign

The Queen's Arms is a Grade II listed public house on Hartfield Road in Cowden, a village in the Sevenoaks district of Kent, England. Dating from the mid-19th century and believed by the Campaign for Real Ale (CAMRA) to have been built in 1841 by William Longley of Pound House, it retains a largely intact historic interior that CAMRA has recognised as being of "outstanding national historic importance", awarding it three stars on its National Inventory of Historic Pub Interiors. The pub was associated with the Maynard family from 1913 until 2014 and became known locally as both "Annie's" and "Elsie's".

== History ==
The building is a public house with attached outbuildings, dating from the mid-19th century, with a 20th-century extension to the right. According to the Campaign for Real Ale (CAMRA), the pub was built in 1841 by William Longley of Pound House, and its name commemorates the Queen's Own Royal West Kent Regiment.

The Queen's Arms was associated with the same family from 1913 until 2014. Elsie Maynard became licensee in 1973, succeeding her mother, Annie Maynard, and the pub was known locally as both "Annie's" and "Elsie's". Following Elsie's move into a care home in 2014 and her subsequent death, the pub remained open and was operated by a group of local residents for nearly five years.

On 28 July 1999, the Queen's Arms was designated a Grade II listed building. It was included on the Campaign for Real Ale (CAMRA)'s National Inventory of Historic Pub Interiors before the inventory's grading system was revised. Under the revised scheme, it is rated three stars and its interior is regarded as being "of outstanding national historic importance".

Originally a tied house of E. & H. Kelsey Brewery of Tunbridge Wells, it passed to J. W. Green of Luton and later to Whitbread and Admiral Taverns. It is now independently operated. The pub was famed for many years for having a hand painted "Lager not sold here" sign to the left of the front door.

== Architecture ==
=== Exterior ===
The building is constructed of red brick with areas of contrasting darker brickwork and has decorative gables finished with tiles. The main building has a Welsh slate roof, while the attached outbuildings are roofed with red clay tiles. Chimneys rise at each end of the roof.

The pub is arranged around a central entrance hall with bars on either side. It has two storeys and a three-bay frontage, with a central doorway flanked by projecting bay windows. The upper floor contains three sash windows, while the side elevations have casement windows. To the rear is a range of attached single-storey outbuildings, including a gable-end facing the pub with a sash window.

=== Interior ===
The interior is arranged around a central hall, from which doors lead to the bars on either side and to the serving area. The servery retains an L-shaped bar counter with panelled detailing. The entrance lobby also retains its original arrangement, with separate doors leading to the public and saloon bars and another to the former private quarters. The bar to the right contains tongue-and-groove wall panelling, fixed bench seating and a brick fireplace added in the mid-20th century. The room retains its original Victorian bar counter with decorative brackets, and evidence of a former spittoon trough survives at its base. Three Dalex handpumps, dated 1948, remain in use.

The bar to the left was originally divided into two separate rooms before being combined in the mid-20th century. It retains a curved bar counter and a surviving pane of 19th-century etched glass in one of the bay windows. The enlargement formed part of alterations carried out in 1953, when a former private room was incorporated into the bar. The room also retains a service bell, a "please ring for service" sign and a fireplace. A rear extension added in 1953 accommodates the ladies' toilets, while indoor gents' facilities replaced external toilets in the same year.

Other traditional fittings include metal crisp tins dating from the period when crisps were supplied in tins, and a Bisset mechanical dart scorer operated by finger-controlled dials.

== See also ==
- Listed buildings in Cowden
