= Cowden =

Village in Kent, England

Coordinates: 51°08′41″N 0°05′36″E

- Village and civil parish
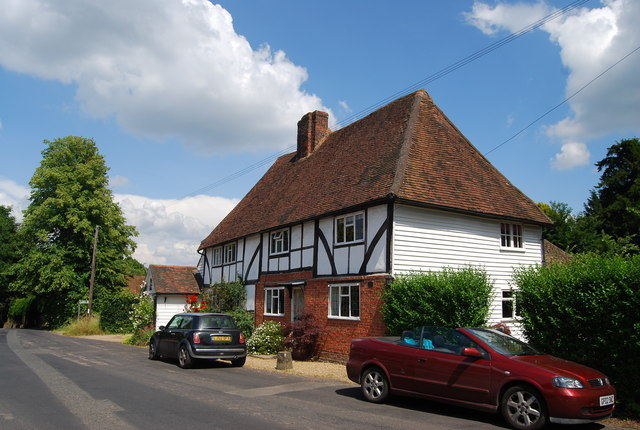
- A cottage on the High Street

- Location within Kent
- Population: 818 (2011 Census)
- District: Sevenoaks
- Shire county: Kent
- Region: South East
- Country: England
- Sovereign state: United Kingdom
- Post town: Edenbridge
- Postcode district: TN8
- Police: Kent
- Fire: Kent
- Ambulance: South East Coast
- UK Parliament: Tonbridge

Cowden (/kaʊˈdɛn/) is a village and civil parish in the Sevenoaks District of Kent, England. The parish is located on the northern slopes of the Weald, south-west of Tonbridge, and lies close to the borders of both East Sussex and Surrey. It is situated within the High Weald AONB. The old High Street has Grade II listed cottages and village houses, and there is an inn called The Fountain. At the 2011 Census the population of the village was 818.

== History ==
The Romans built the London to Lewes Way across what is now the garden of Waystrode Manor. The first owners of the manor received it from King John in 1208.

Crippenden Manor, built in about 1607, was once the home of ironmaster, Richard Tichborne (1568–1639), related to the Tichbornes of Tichborne, Hampshire. This branch of the Tichbornes descended from a younger son of John Tichborne and Margaret Martin, who inherited his mother's lands in and around Edenbridge, including Crippenden. Richard was the son of John Tichborne (c1549-1620) and Dorothy Chaloner, daughter of Thomas Chaloner of Lyndfield and his wife, Alice Shirley. Richard married Dorothy Saxbie, circa 1592, and had at least ten children, including Dorothy who married John Tillinghast (1604–55), son of the Rector of Streat, who was also involved in the iron industry. Richard formally leased Crippenden from 1612 and built the house there. It descended to Captain Edmund Tichborne who sold the manor after 1721.

The village appears as Cudena in Textus Roffensis.

In 1649 Robert Tichborne, a nephew of Richard Tichborne, petitioned the House of Commons in favour of the execution of Charles I. He was one of the Commissioners who, in 1651, prepared the way for the union with Scotland; he was knighted in 1655 by Cromwell, and was elevated to the peerage in 1657. After the Restoration of the monarchy in 1660, he was arrested and sentenced to death, but was reprieved, imprisoned in Dover Castle and died, in 1682, in the Tower of London. The family, however, did not die out in Cowden until 1708, when the last member of the family, John Tichbourne, was buried there.

This is old Wealden iron country, recalled by the cast iron memorial slab in the church, to John Bottinge, dated 1622. This was a time when the area was producing guns for the Army and Navy, as well as domestic and agricultural ware. Cowden had its own blast furnace from 1573 until sometime in the 18th century. Kitford Mead, the blast furnace keepers abode, was built in 1573. It has the only remaining exterior combing decoration left in the south of England and is a Grade II listed building. An iron furnace at Cowden, mentioned in 1574 and 1588, was situated at Lat 51 deg 8' 20" N., Long 0 deg 4' 50 " E. It was "ruined" before 1664. Apparently the furnace was established by John Tichborne, whose mill was proved in 1556. In 1574 a mill was worked by Michael Weston of Lye and is presumed to be the Cowden Furnace. A rumoured second 'upper' Cowden Furnace is now known to have been Scarlets Furnace, situated nearby on the Kent side of the stream. The three counties actually meet between old Basings house and Smithers Farm.

== Parish church ==
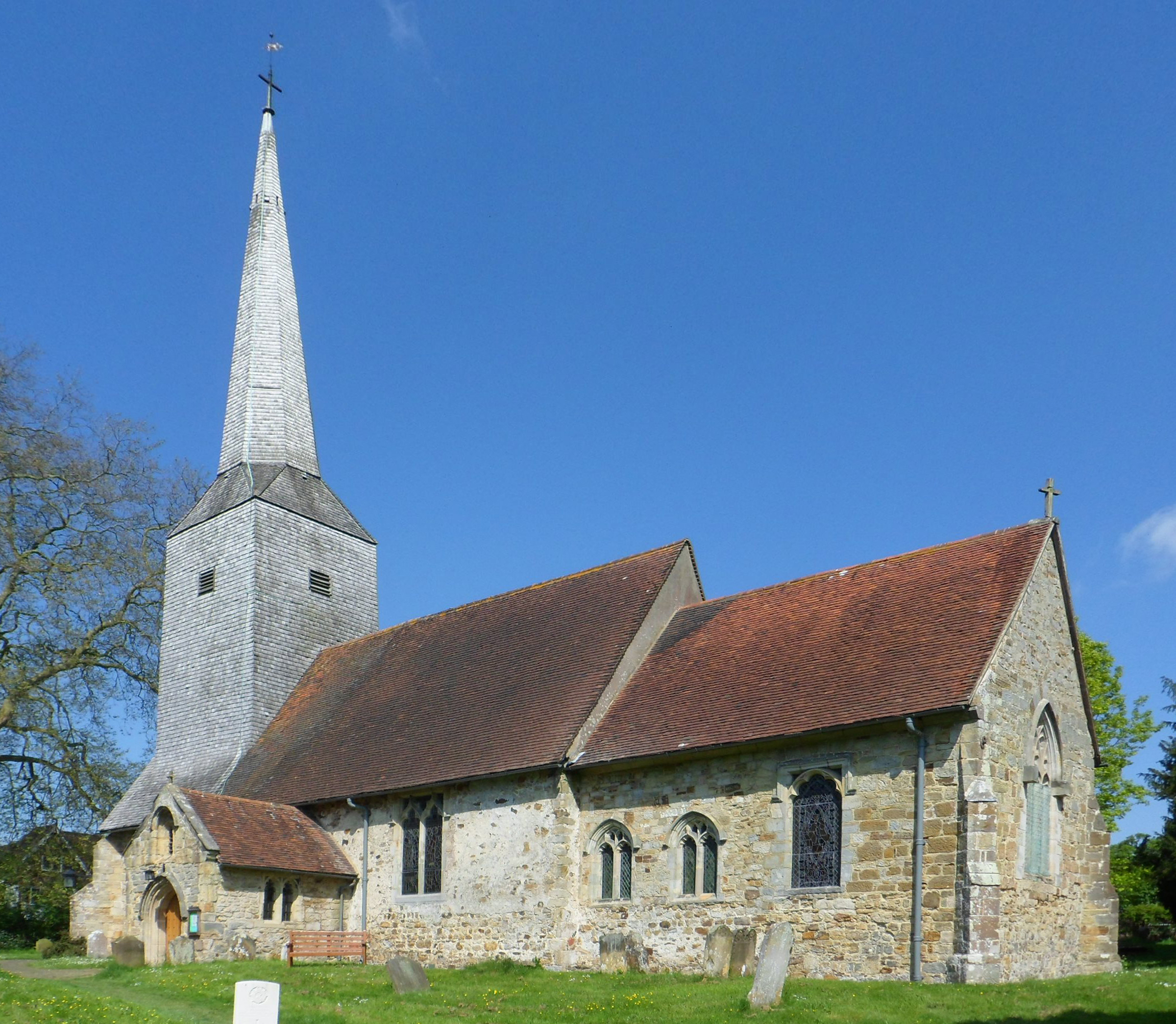
St Mary Magdalene's Church, Cowden

Parts of the parish straddle the Kent Water which forms the border with East Sussex and Surrey where the three counties meet. It is centred on the 13th-century church of St Mary Magdalene with its slender, wooden shingled spire, bomb-damaged during World War II and since re-shingled. The spire is barely perceptibly out of perpendicular, which gave rise to a rhyme:

Cowden church, crooked steeple, Lying priest, deceitful people.

The church is built of sandstone, its tower and steeple timber-framed inside. The old bells were recast and rehung in 1911 to commemorate the reign of Edward VII and a sixth bell was added at the Coronation of George V.

A stained glass window, by W Warren Wilson, given to the church in 1947, celebrates 'the remarkable preservation of this village during the years 1939-45' and features figures of St Bridget (representing the women of the parish), St Nicholas (for the sailors), St George (the soldiers and airmen), and St Mary Magdalene, all the company of Sir Walstan (the farmer bishop of Worcester Wulfstan (1062–95) representing the local farmers). Below them are 20th-century figures: a sailor, soldier, airman, a nurse, and others making up a representative group of people involved in World War II, all turned towards a Christ-figure whose protection they seek. The church is a Grade I listed building.

== The Queens Arms ==
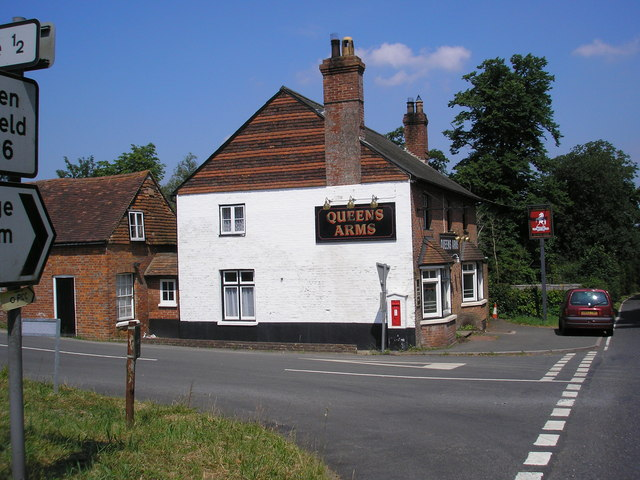
The Queens Arms

The Queens Arms is a mid 19th century Grade II listed public house at Hartfield Road. It is on the Campaign for Real Ale's National Inventory of Historic Pub Interiors.

== Transport ==
Cowden railway station is on the Uckfield branch of the Oxted Line. There is a regular service to London and Uckfield. The Cowden rail crash occurred just south of the station on 15 October 1994.

== Notable residents ==
English author and actress Clemence Dane (Winifred Ashton) wrote part of her novel The Arrogant History of White Ben in Cowden, signing the book Cowden 1938 at the end of the tale.

The English author and illustrator of children's books, Roger Hargreaves, best known as the creator of the Mr Men and Little Miss series of books, lived at Sussex House Farm in Hartfield Road from 1982 to 1988. He is buried in the graveyard of the parish church, in an extension of land which he had donated the year before his death.

== See also ==
- Listed buildings in Cowden
