= Paul Hornung =

American football player (1935–2020)

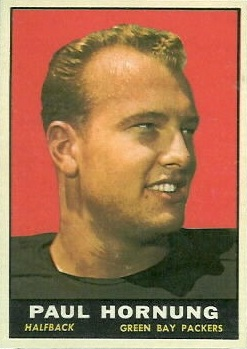
- Hornung in 1961

No. 5
- Positions: Halfback, kicker

Personal information
- Born: December 23, 1935; Louisville, Kentucky, U.S.
- Died: November 13, 2020 (aged 84); Louisville, Kentucky, U.S.
- Listed height: 6 ft 2 in (1.88 m)
- Listed weight: 215 lb (98 kg)

Career information
- High school: Flaget (Louisville)
- College: Notre Dame (1954–1956)
- NFL draft: 1957: 1st round, 1st overall pick

Career history
- Green Bay Packers (1957–1962; 1964–1966); New Orleans Saints (1967)*
- * Offseason or practice squad member only

Awards and highlights
- Super Bowl champion (I); 4× NFL champion (1961, 1962, 1965, 1966); NFL Most Valuable Player (1961); 2× First-team All-Pro (1960, 1961); Second-team All-Pro (1959); 2× Pro Bowl (1959, 1960); NFL rushing touchdowns leader (1960); 3× NFL scoring leader (1959–1961); NFL 1960s All-Decade Team; Bert Bell Award (1961); Green Bay Packers Hall of Fame; Heisman Trophy (1956); Chic Harley Award (1956); Consensus All-American (1955); First-team All-American (1956)

Career NFL statistics
- Rushing yards: 3,711
- Rushing average: 4.2
- Rushing touchdowns: 50
- Receptions: 130
- Receiving yards: 1,480
- Receiving touchdowns: 12
- Points scored: 760
- Stats at Pro Football Reference
- Pro Football Hall of Fame
- College Football Hall of Fame

Paul Vernon Hornung (December 23, 1935 – November 13, 2020), nicknamed "the Golden Boy", was an American professional football halfback and kicker who played for the Green Bay Packers of the National Football League (NFL) from 1957 to 1966 (except the 1963 NFL season, for which he was suspended after a scandal involving gambling and associating with gamblers).

He played on teams that won four NFL titles and the first Super Bowl. He is the first Heisman Trophy winner to win the NFL Most Valuable Player award and to be inducted into both the Pro Football Hall of Fame and College Football Hall of Fame. Packers coach Vince Lombardi stated that Hornung was "the greatest player I ever coached".

Hornung was a halfback, quarterback, and kicker. He was an all-around college athlete at the University of Notre Dame, where he played basketball in addition to football.

== Early life ==
Hornung was born and raised in Louisville, Kentucky. He was the son of Paul Vernon Hornung Sr. and Loretta Williams. He was an outstanding athlete at Flaget High School in Louisville, and lettered all four years in football, basketball, and baseball. He was recruited by Bear Bryant at Kentucky in nearby Lexington, but chose to attend Notre Dame instead.

== College career ==
After spending his sophomore season of 1954 as a backup fullback, Hornung blossomed as a halfback and safety during his junior year in 1955. He finished fourth in the nation in total offense with 1,215 yards and six touchdowns. His two touchdowns on offense and two interceptions on defense spurred a victory over No. 4 Navy, and his touchdown pass and field goal beat Iowa. In a loss to Southern California, Hornung ran and threw for 354 yards, the best in the nation in 1955.

In the 1956 season, he led his team in passing, rushing, scoring, kickoff and punt returns, and punting. He also played defense, leading the team in passes broken up and ranking second in interceptions and tackles. In spite of Notre Dame's 2–8 record, Hornung won the Heisman Trophy in 1956 as the season's outstanding college football player – the only time a player from a losing team has been so honored. Nicknamed "The Golden Boy", the highly versatile quarterback could run, pass, block, and tackle. Many consider Hornung the greatest all-around football player in Notre Dame history.

Hornung also played basketball during his sophomore year at Notre Dame. He has said that he attended Notre Dame in part for the opportunity to play basketball, and that he was asked not to continue playing in order to help keep his grades up.

== Professional career ==
After graduating from Notre Dame with a degree in business, Hornung was the first selection overall in the 1957 NFL draft. He was taken by the Green Bay Packers, with whom he went on to win four league championships, including the first Super Bowl in January 1967.

Hornung was the only Packer on the roster who did not play in Super Bowl I. A pinched nerve sidelined him, and he chose not to enter the game in the fourth quarter.

As a professional, Hornung played the halfback position as well as field goal kicker for several seasons. Hornung led the league in scoring for three straight seasons from 1959–61. During the 1960 season, the last with just 12 games, he set an all-time record by scoring 176 points. Hornung also passed for two additional touchdowns, which did not add to his point-scoring total. The record stood until the 2006 season, when running back LaDainian Tomlinson of the San Diego Chargers broke the record with 180 points by scoring his 30th touchdown on December 17, leaving him with four points more than Hornung's record with more than two games to play (but in his 14th game, compared to Hornung's 12 games).

In 1961, Hornung tied the scoring record for a player in a postseason game (held by Pat Harder in 1952) with a 19-point effort in the NFL championship game. That record stood for nearly 33 years until Ricky Watters scored 30 points in the 1994 NFC Divisional Round. In Green Bay's 1965 championship win, he rushed for 105 yards and a touchdown on a very muddy field against the Cleveland Browns. In October of that same year, he set a record for most points in a calendar month with 77. This was also broken by Tomlinson, who posted 78 points in November 2006.

Hornung was voted the league's Most Valuable Player in 1961 and was chosen as an All-Pro twice and named to the Pro Bowl twice. He is one of only nine players to have won both the Heisman Trophy and the NFL's Most Valuable Player Award. He is also the first player to ever make a 50+ yard fair catch kick, which is a rule that allows a team that has just made a fair catch to attempt a free kick from the spot of the catch. This came in 1964 on September 13, at the end of the first half of the opener against rival (and defending champion) Chicago.

In 1965 the 29 year-old Hornung scored a team-record five touchdowns (three rushing and two pass receptions) in a 42–27 road win over the Baltimore Colts on December 12. Hornung's five TD's were overshadowed by the record-tying six touchdowns scored by Chicago's Gale Sayers later that same day against San Francisco at Wrigley Field. But the Packers' victory over the Colts proved important for the Packers, as they wound up tied with the Colts in the Western Conference standings at season's end (forcing an extra playoff game on December 26 which the Packers won in overtime to advance to the NFL Championship). In that NFL championship game against the Cleveland Browns on January 2, Hornung ran for 105 yards and a touchdown in the Packers' 23–12 win for their third league title under Lombardi.

A pinched nerve in Hornung's neck severely curtailed his playing time in 1966, and Hornung did not see action in Super Bowl I, when the Packers defeated the Kansas City Chiefs, 35–10. Hornung was selected in the expansion draft by the New Orleans Saints, who later traded for Hornung's backfield mate at Green Bay, Jim Taylor. Hornung never suited up for the Saints, as the neck injury forced him to retire during training camp. Taylor & Hornung were affectionately known as "Thunder & Lightning" by Packer fans of the early 1960s.

Hornung holds the record for most games with 30+ points (2), the most games with 25+ points (3), and the most games with 13 points in a season (8 games in 1960). He also holds the dubious distinction of having missed an NFL record 26 field goals in a season, doing so in 1964.

== NFL career statistics ==
Legend
	AP NFL MVP
	Won NFL championship
	Won the Super Bowl
	Led the league
**Bold**	Career high

Year	Team	GP	Rushing						Receiving				
Year	Team	GP	Att	Yds	Avg	Lng	TD	Y/G	Rec	Yds	Avg	Lng	TD
1957	GB	12	60	319	**5.3**	**72**	3	26.6	6	34	5.7	16	0
1958	GB	12	69	310	4.5	55	2	25.8	15	137	9.1	39	0
1959	GB	12	152	**681**	4.5	63	7	**56.8**	15	113	7.5	19	0
1960	GB	12	**160**	671	4.2	37	**13**	55.9	**28**	257	9.2	33	2
1961	GB	12	127	597	4.7	54	8	49.8	15	145	9.7	34	2
1962	GB	9	57	219	3.8	37	5	24.3	9	168	**18.7**	**83**	2
1963	GB	Missed season due to suspension											
1964	GB	14	103	415	4.0	40	5	29.6	9	98	10.9	40	0
1965	GB	12	89	299	3.4	17	5	24.9	19	**336**	17.7	65	**3**
1966	GB	9	76	200	2.6	9	2	22.2	14	192	13.7	44	**3**
Career		104	893	3,711	4.2	72	50	35.7	130	1,480	11.4	83	12

== Honors and awards ==
Hornung was elected to the Green Bay Packers Hall of Fame in 1975, the College Football Hall of Fame in 1985, the Pro Football Hall of Fame in 1986, the National High School Hall of Fame in 1989, and the Wisconsin Athletic Hall of Fame in 1990. Also, the "Paul Hornung Award" is given out annually to the state of Kentucky's top high school player. Starting in 2010, an award named in Hornung's honor is given out to the most versatile college football player in the nation. Hornung's number 5 was also unofficially retired by Lombardi on July 10, 1967, as there has not been a ceremony to have his number on the wall of retired numbers at Lambeau Field. A large number of his awards and honors, including his Notre Dame diploma, can be found in the basement of a close friend and old Army buddy (Wallace Peters) living in Indiana.

== Off the field ==
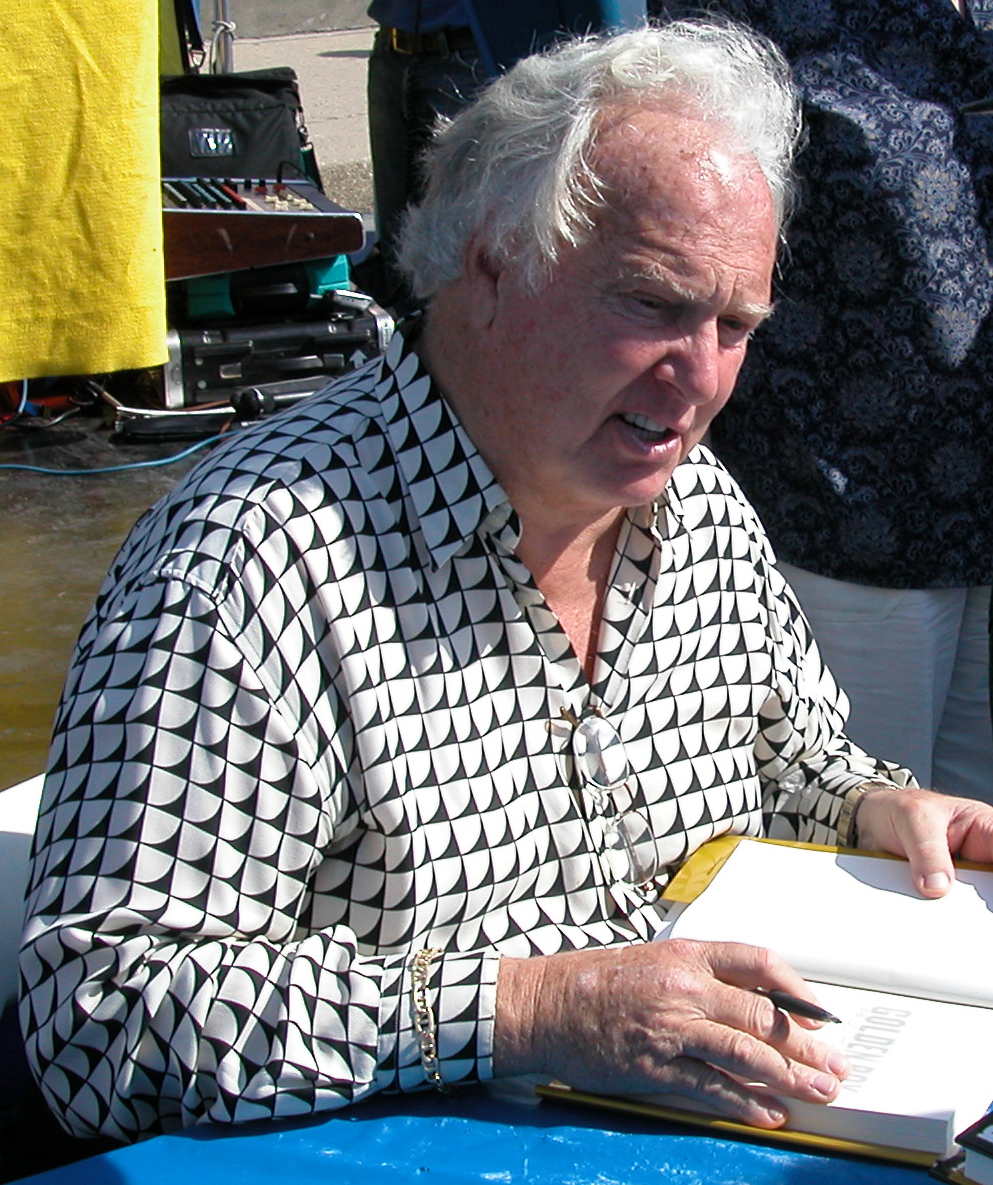
Hornung signing a copy of his book Golden Boy in 2004

Hornung was obliged to serve in the U.S. Army and he was called to active duty during the 1961 season, but he was able to get weekend passes to play on Sundays. Head coach Vince Lombardi was a friend of President John F. Kennedy, and a pass was arranged so Hornung could play in the NFL championship game against the New York Giants.

Sport magazine named Hornung the most outstanding player in the 1961 championship game, which led to a tax dispute between Hornung and the Internal Revenue Service that cemented the tax status of awards to athletes. Hornung was awarded a 1962 Chevrolet Corvette, but the car's fair market value was not included on his tax returns for either 1961 or 1962. The dispute went to the United States Tax Court in the case of Hornung v. Commissioner. The court determined that because it would have been impossible for Hornung to take possession of the Corvette in 1961 – the game was played on December 31 in Green Bay and the car was in a closed dealership in New York – the car should have been included in income in 1962. More importantly for the athletic community, the court also determined that awards for achievement in the field of athletics do not fall under the exceptions provided under section 74(b) of the Internal Revenue Code. From this point on, it became impossible for athletes to exclude any awards they are given for athletics from their gross incomes.

Hornung's penchant for high-living proved disastrous when, in 1963, a major scandal erupted and Hornung and another of the league's top stars, defensive tackle Alex Karras of the Detroit Lions, were suspended from football indefinitely in April 1963 by commissioner Pete Rozelle for betting on NFL games and associating with undesirable persons. Forthright in admitting to his mistake, Hornung's image went relatively untarnished, and in 1964 his suspension, and Karras's, were re-evaluated by the league and both were reinstated in March.

In a September 2006 interview with Bob Costas, Hornung stated that it was his belief that it was Lombardi's constant lobbying of Rozelle that got him reinstated for the 1964 NFL season. In exchange for Lombardi's efforts, Hornung agreed not to have anything to do with gambling, to stay out of Las Vegas and to even forgo attending the Kentucky Derby which he had done annually.

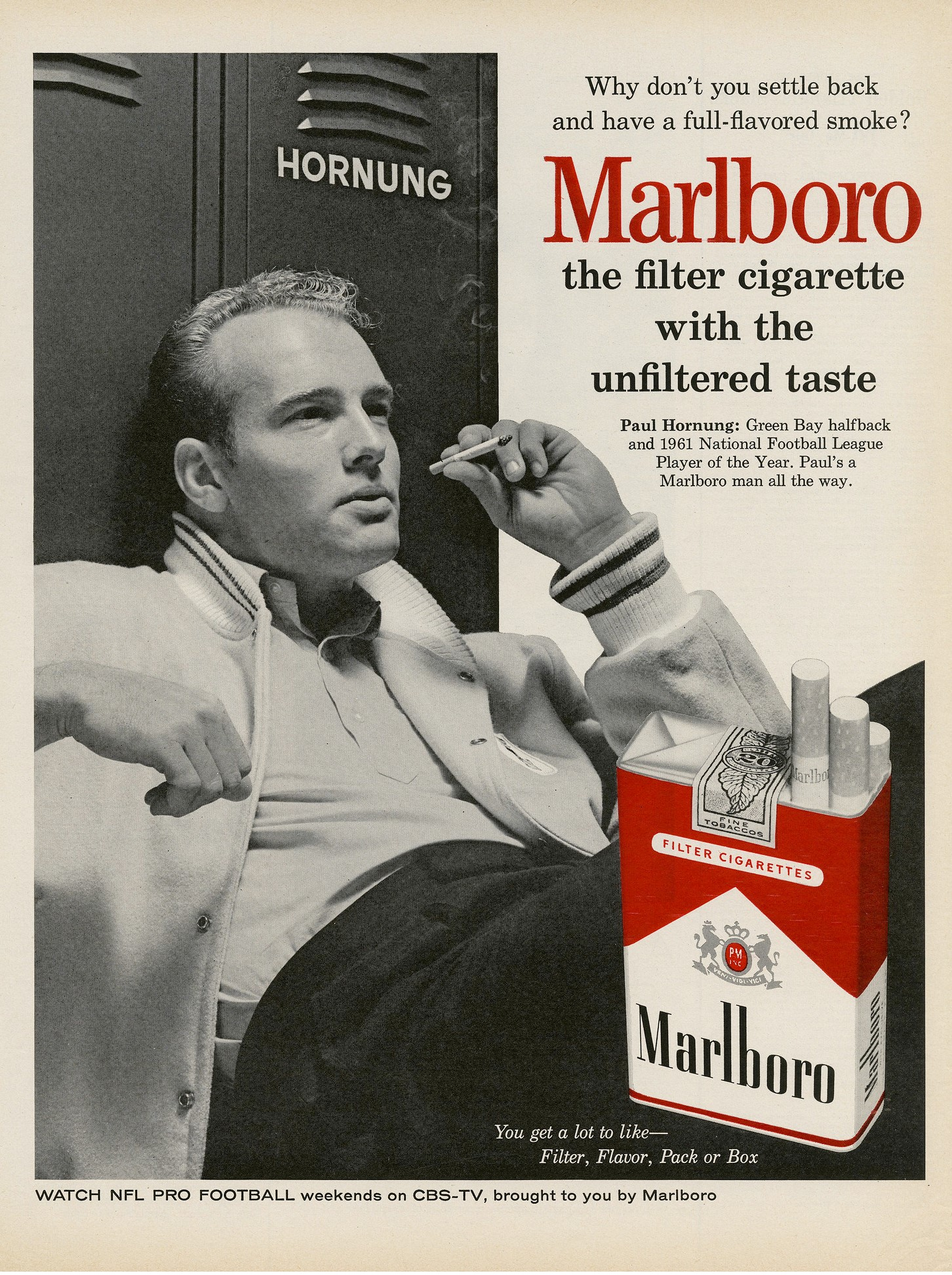
1962 advertisement for Marlboro cigarettes

Hornung was employed as a color analyst on Minnesota Vikings radio broadcasts from 1970 to 1974, as well as TVS WFL telecasts in 1974, CBS NFL telecasts from 1975 to 1979, and ABC Radio USFL broadcasts from 1983 to 1985. He also worked as a sideline reporter for CBS' coverage of Super Bowl XII. Hornung did college play-by-play for TigerVision, LSU's pay-per-view broadcasts in 1982 with ex-Green Bay Packers teammate Jim Taylor. Hornung also performed color commentary for games on College Football on TBS in the early 1980s.

Upon Rozelle's retirement in 1989, Hornung wrote him a letter crediting him with promoting the NFL's rise and for having been "the best commissioner of any [sports league]".

During a radio interview on March 30, 2004, Hornung, speaking about the recent lack of football success at Notre Dame, said, "We can't stay as strict as we are as far as the academic structure is concerned because we've got to get the black athletes. We must get the black athletes if we're going to compete." The response was immediate. The University replied, "We strongly disagree with the thesis of his remarks. They are generally insensitive and specifically insulting to our past and current African-American student-athletes." Famed former Notre Dame head coach Ara Parseghian also disagreed with Hornung, saying that Notre Dame did not lower admission standards for him. Hornung said that he was not differentiating between races. "We need better ball players, black and white, at Notre Dame."

Hornung's lifetime dream was to have a horse compete in the Kentucky Derby. He had a horse on the 2013 Road to the Kentucky Derby by the name of Titletown Five, trained by friend and hall of fame trainer D. Wayne Lukas. Although the horse did not earn enough points to gain entry to the race, the horse was entered in the 2013 Preakness Stakes, finishing last.

In 2019, Hornung appeared on the Nissan Heisman House commercial titled Delay of game.

Hornung died on November 13, 2020, at the age of 84, in Louisville, Kentucky from dementia, which he felt was caused by multiple concussions. He was survived by his wife of 41 years, Angela (Cervilli) Hornung.

Hornung is one of at least 345 NFL players to be diagnosed after death with chronic traumatic encephalopathy (CTE), which is caused by repeated hits to the head.

== See also ==
- Paul Hornung Award
- List of NCAA major college yearly punt and kickoff return leaders
- List of NFL players with chronic traumatic encephalopathy
