= Cancer Investigation =

- Language: English
- Edited by: Gary Lyman

Publication details
- History: 1983-present
- Publisher: Informa Healthcare (United States)
- Frequency: 10/year
- Impact factor: 2.218 (2014)

Standard abbreviations
- ISO 4: Cancer Investig.
- NLM: Cancer Invest

Indexing
- ISSN: 0735-7907 (print); 1532-4192 (web)

Links
- Journal homepage

Cancer Investigation is a peer-reviewed medical journal in the field of basic and clinical oncology. The editor in chief is Gary Herbert Lyman. It is currently indexed for MEDLINE.
