= Art director =

Supervisor of an artistic production

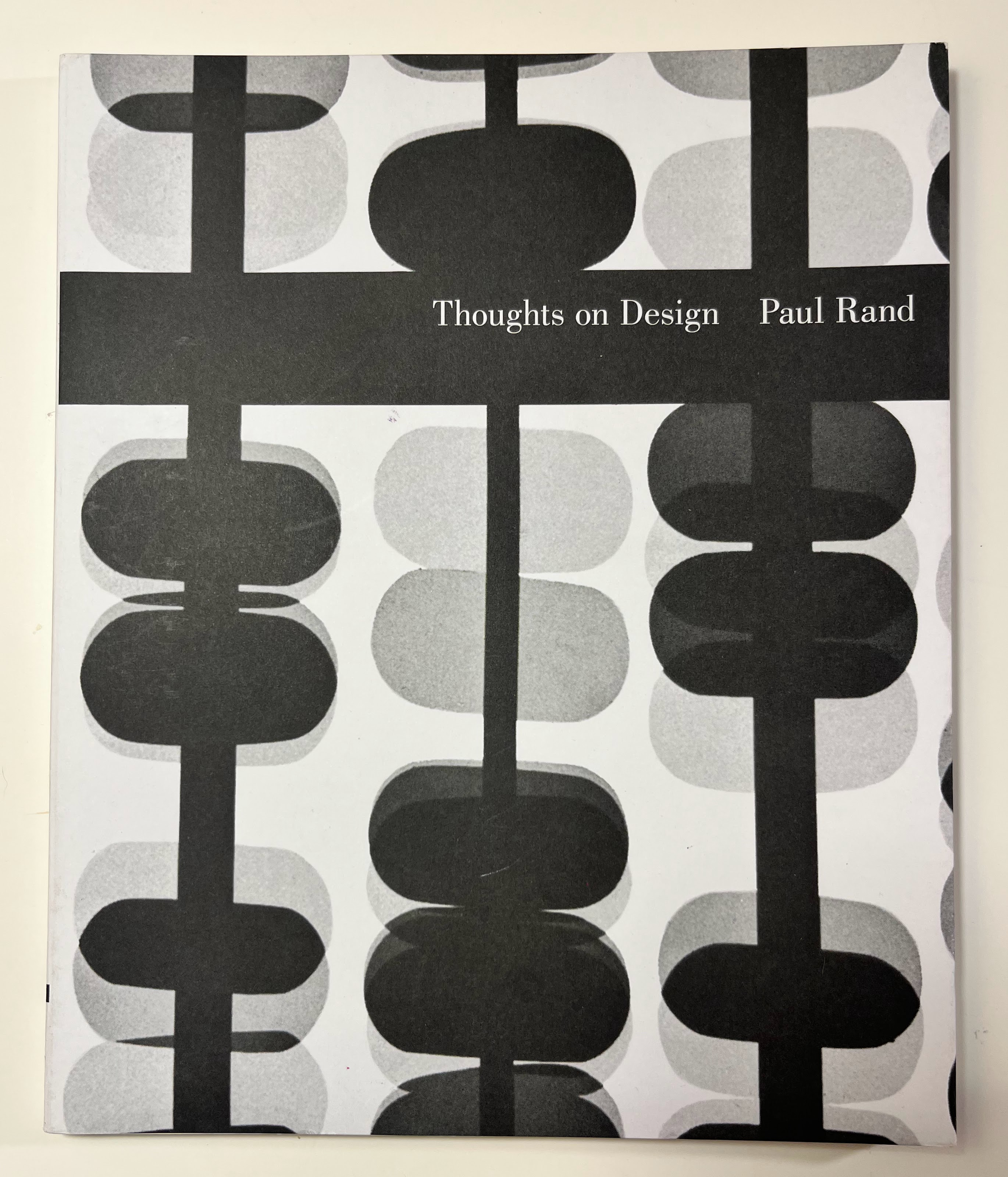
Thoughts on Design, a book by influential art director and graphic designer Paul Rand

Art director is a title for a variety of similar job functions in advertising, marketing, publishing, the performing arts (including theater, film, television, and animation), fashion, the Internet, and video games.

The art director's role is to supervise the visual style and images of an artistic production. In particular, they are in charge of its overall visual appearance and how it communicates visually, stimulates moods, contrasts features, and psychologically appeals to a target audience. The art director makes decisions about visual elements, what artistic style(s) to use, and when to use motion. One of the biggest challenges art directors face is translating desired moods, messages, concepts, and underdeveloped ideas into imagery. In the brainstorm process, art directors, colleagues and clients explore ways the finished piece or scene could look. At times, the art director is responsible for solidifying the vision of the collective imagination while resolving conflicting agendas and inconsistencies between contributors' ideas.

In eastern animated works, such as Japanese anime and Chinese animation, the role of art director (美術監督, bijutsu kantoku) specifically refers to the artist in charge of supervising and directing the background art and the background art staff of a particular work, rather than a role unifying a work's overall artistic vision.

== In advertising and marketing ==
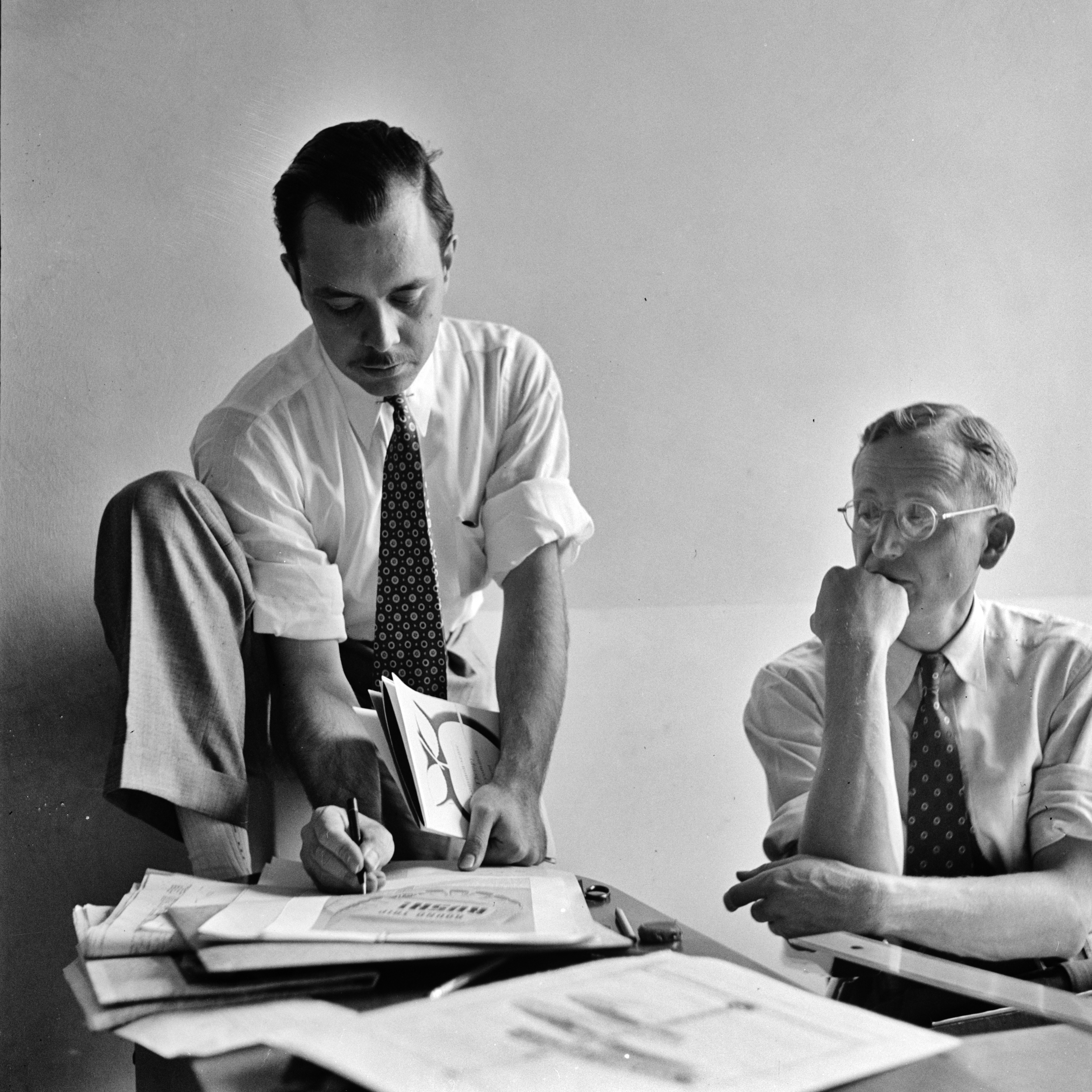
Art director and copywriter at an advertising agency in Detroit, Michigan, in 1942. Photograph by Arthur Siegel.

In modern advertising practice, an art director typically works with a copywriter as a creative team to devise an overall concept (also known as the "creative" or "big idea") for a commercial, mailer, brochure, or other advertisements. The copywriter is responsible for the text (referred to as "copy"), and the art director for the visual aspects. Art directors commonly collaborate on execution of the advertisement with other team members such as graphic designers. A benefit of a creative team is that art directors may contribute to the concept or copy, and copywriters may suggest a visual approach. Such collaboration, first pioneered by Bill Bernbach of DDB, is considered to improve the creative work.

Although a good art director is expected to have good graphic design judgment and technical knowledge of production, it may not be necessary for an art director to hand-render comprehensive layouts, or even be able to draw, now that virtually all but the most preliminary work is done on computer. Despite the title, an advertising art director is not necessarily the head of an art department.

A team composed of an art director and copywriter is typically overseen by a creative director. In a large organization, an art director may oversee other art directors and a team of junior designers, image developers and/or production artists, and coordinate with a separate production department. In a smaller organization, the art director may fill all these roles, including overseeing printing and other production.

== Performing arts ==
=== In film ===
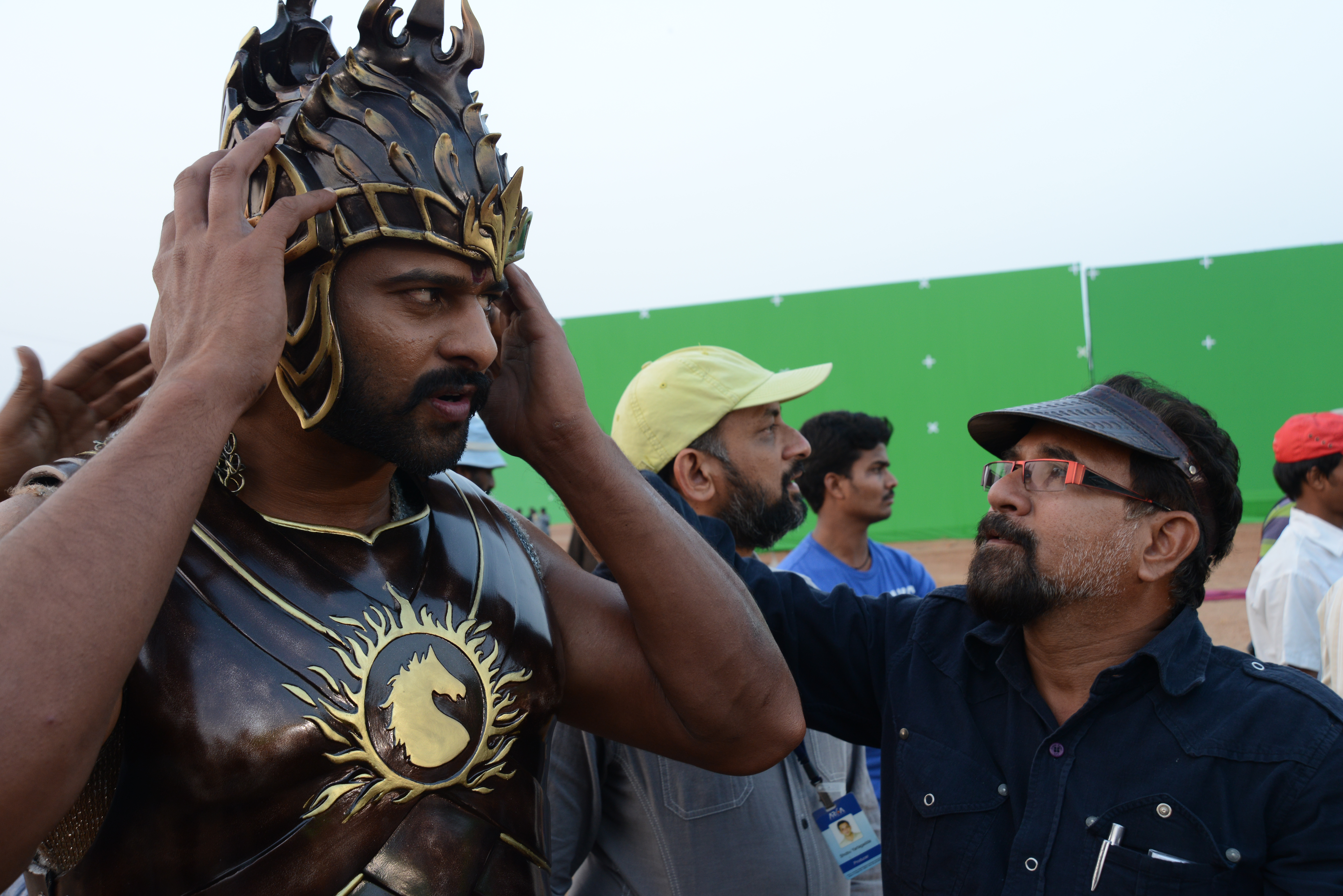
Actor Prabhas with Sabu Cyril, production designer and art director for Baahubali: The Beginning

An art director heads a film art department, working directly below the production designer and in collaboration with the set decorator and the set designers. A large part of their duties includes the administrative aspects of the art department. They are responsible for assigning tasks to personnel, such as the art department coordinator and the construction coordinator, tracking the art department budget and scheduling, and overseeing overall quality control. They are often also a liaison to other departments, especially construction, special effects, property, transportation (graphics), and locations departments. The art director also attends all production meetings and tech scouts in order to provide information to the set designers in preparation for all departments to have a visual floor plan of each location visited.

The term "art director" was first used in 1914 by Wilfred Buckland when this title was used to denote the head of the art department (hence the Academy Award for Best Art Direction), which also included the set decorator. Now the award includes the production designer and set decorator. On the movie Gone with the Wind, David O. Selznick felt that William Cameron Menzies had such a significant role in the look of the film that the title art director was not sufficient, and so he gave Menzies the title of production designer. This title is now commonly used as the title for the head of the art department, although the title actually implies control over every visual aspect of a film, including costumes.

On films with smaller art departments, such as small independent films and short films, the terms "production designer" and "art director" are often synonymous, and the person taking on the role may be credited as either.

In the United States and Canada, the Art Directors Guild is a labor union for art directors and related professions in film and television production.

== In publishing ==
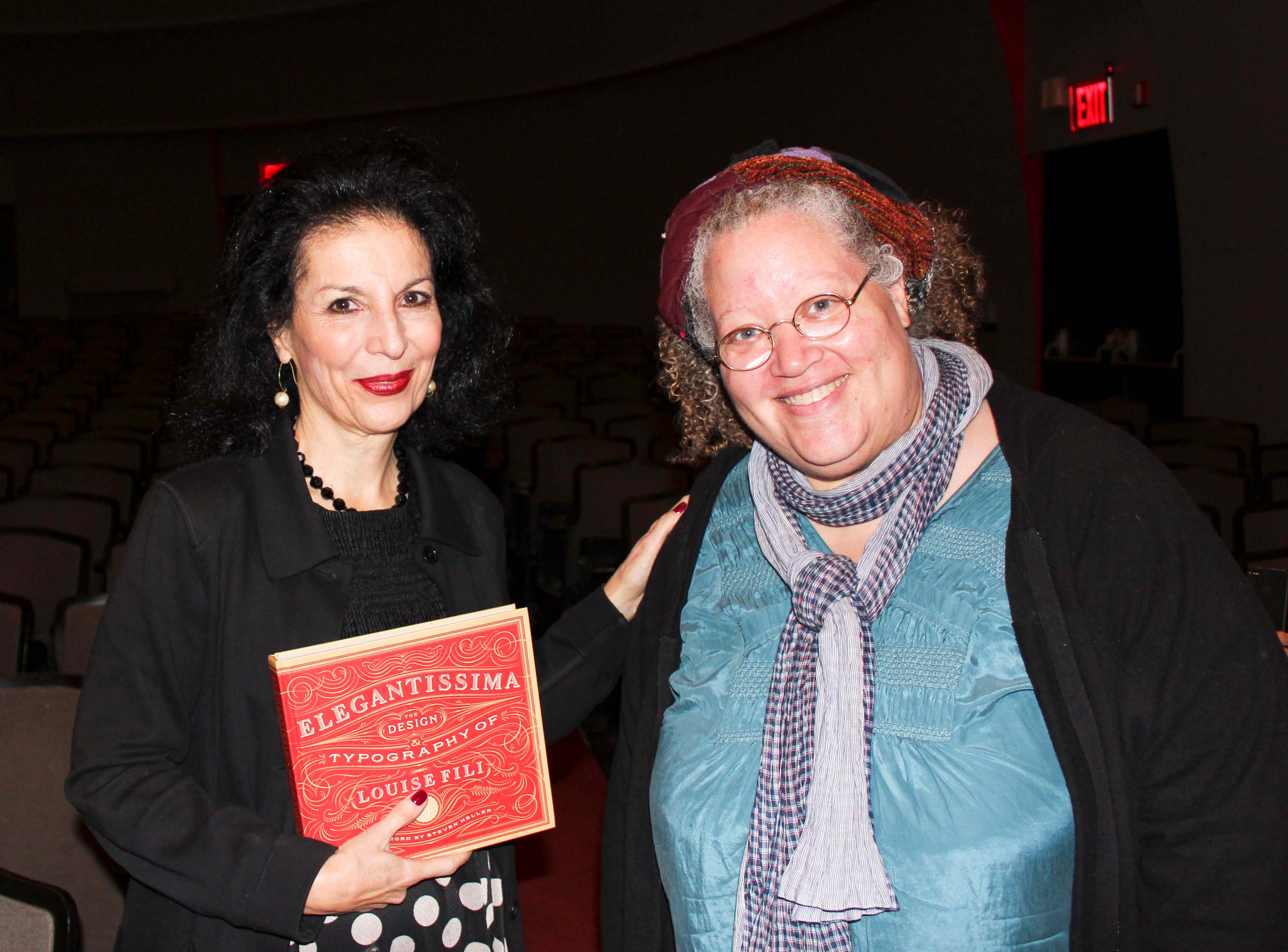
Louise Fili, former art director at Pantheon Books, and Gail Anderson, former senior art director of Rolling Stone

Art directors in publishing typically work with the publication's editors. Together, they work on a concept for sections and pages of a publication. The art director is mostly responsible for the visual look and feel of the publication, and the editor has ultimate responsibility for the publication's text content.

Mehemed Fehmy Agha was one of the first art directors in magazine publishing, having assumed the role first at German Vogue in Berlin, and then in 1929 at Condé Nast in New York, providing art direction for Vanity Fair, Vogue, and House & Garden.

== See also ==
- Production designer
- VFX creative director
- Scenography
- Art Directors Club of New York
