= Hornung v. Commissioner =

United States Tax Court case

- Court: United States Tax Court
- Full case name: Paul V. Hornung v. Commissioner of Internal Revenue
- Decided: January 27, 1967
- Citation: 47 T.C. 428 (1967)

Court membership
- Judge sitting: Hoyt

Case opinions
- Decision by: Hoyt

Laws applied
- Internal Revenue Code

Hornung v. Commissioner is a case heard by the United States Tax Court in 1967.

== Issues ==
1. Whether the value of a 1962 Chevrolet Corvette won by Paul Hornung (taxpayer) for his performance in the 1961 National Football League championship game should be included in his gross income for the taxable year 1962;
2. Whether the value of the use of the 1962 Thunderbird automobiles furnished to Hornung by Ford should be included in gross income for the taxable year 1962;
3. Whether Hornung's gross income for 1962 should include the value of a fur stole received by his mother from his employer.

== Facts ==
=== Pertaining to the 1962 Corvette (Issue 1) ===
Sport Magazine annually awarded a new Corvette to the outstanding player in the National Football League championship game. The 1961 National Football League Championship was played on Sunday, December 31, 1961, in Green Bay, Wisconsin between the Green Bay Packers and the New York Giants. Paul Hornung scored a record 19 points in the game, helping the Packers win the championship 37-0. Sport Magazine informed Hornung after the game that he had been declared Sport Magazine's outstanding player, and that as the most outstanding player, Hornung was awarded a 1962 Corvette.

On December 31, the Corvette was physically in New York City, where Sport Magazine’s offices were located. The editor in chief of Sport Magazine did not have the key or the title of the Corvette with him in Green Bay, nor did Hornung request immediate possession of the car at the time the award was accepted. Sport considered the car available to Hornung as soon as the award was announced, though Sport had not made any arrangements to have the car ready for Hornung on December 31, and Hornung did not actually receive the car until January 3, 1962 at an awards luncheon in New York. Hornung was not required to attend this luncheon or perform any other services in order to receive the vehicle.

The fair market value of the Corvette was $3,331.04. Hornung sold the vehicle and reported this sale on his 1962 Federal income tax return. However, he did not include the fair market value of the car in his tax return for 1962 or any other year.

=== Pertaining to the 1962 Thunderbirds (Issue 2) ===
In July 1962, Hornung asked a friend to arrange for a car to be available for him to drive while in Green Bay. A local Ford dealership furnished Hornung with a 1962 Thunderbird, later exchanging the original for a second 1962 Thunderbird. The title to the cars remained with Ford, though Hornung paid the insurance and all operating costs while driving the Thunderbirds.

Hornung was not asked to make any personal appearances or special efforts for the dealership, except that he was asked to "come in and say hi" during a Ford-sponsored children's football event. Ford had also furnished other Green Bay Packers with vehicles for their use around Green Bay.

Hornung did not recognize or report any income associated with this use. The value of this use was determined to be $600.

=== Pertaining to the Fur Stole (Issue 3) ===
After winning the Western Division title of the National Football League in 1961, Vince Lombardi bought and distributed fur stoles to the wives, friends, and mothers of each player on the team. Hornung's mother received the stole in 1961. The stoles were reported by the Packers as "Other Unallowable Deductions" and were described as "Awards to players' wives, etc." The stoles were valued at $395 per stole, less an 8-percent bulk discount.

Hornung did not report any gross income with respect to the stole given to his mother.

== Analysis ==
=== Pertaining to the 1962 Corvette (Issue 1) ===
Hornung argued both that the Corvette was a gift and therefore exempt from federal income tax, and alternatively that it was constructively received by him in 1961, and therefore was not subject to federal income tax in the year of 1962. The court first addressed Hornung's second argument.

Under section 451 of the Internal Revenue Code, "the amount of any item of gross income shall be included in the gross income for the taxable year in which received by the taxpayer ..."

Under the cash receipts method, which Hornung had appropriately utilized, items constituting gross income are to be included for the taxable year in which they are actually or constructively received.

The court noted that an item is constructively received when it has been set apart for the taxpayer or otherwise made available for him to draw upon, if the intention to do so is known. But "income is not constructively received if the taxpayer's control of its receipt is subject to substantial limitations or restrictions."

The court found that on Sunday, December 31, 1961, there were substantial limitations or restrictions on Hornung’s control over the Corvette. At that time, the car was physically in the state of New York, and the editor in chief of Sport Magazine had neither keys nor title to the vehicle to give to Hornung to establish his possession. Additionally, because December 31, 1961 was a Sunday, the dealership where the car was kept was closed, and Hornung could not have accessed it on that date even if he wanted to.

Based on the above, the Tax Court held that the constructive receipt doctrine was inapplicable and the Corvette was received by Hornung for income tax purposes in 1962.

After the Court established that the car has been received in 1962, it turned to a determination of whether it should be included in gross income for that year, specifically addressing Hornung's "gift" argument. The court determined that the Corvette was not given as a gift because Sport Magazine had a motive for giving it beyond a 'detached and disinterested generosity' (a requisite for a judicial finding of a 'gift').

The court held that the Corvette clearly qualified as a prize or award under section 74(a) of the tax code (26 U.S.C. 74(a)). The court held that the Corvette did not qualify for any exceptions under section 74(b), and thus was gross income to Hornung. The court dismissed Hornung's claims that the championship football game constitutes an educational, artistic, scientific, or civic achievement. The court reaffirmed the principle that words in the revenue acts should be interpreted in their ordinary, everyday sense. The court believed the exceptions articulated in 74(b) refer to "activities enhancing in one way or another the public good."

=== Pertaining to the 1962 Thunderbirds (Issue 2) ===
Hornung argued that the use of the Thunderbirds was a gift under section 102, since he was not obligated to perform any services to use the cars.

The court focused on the dealership's intentions in making the loan, and determined that Hornung had not sufficiently proven that the loaned cars were given as a result of 'detached and disinterested generosity.'

The court then considered whether the economic benefit to Hornung was gross income. Relying on the test provided in Commissioner v. Glenshaw Glass Co., the court found that the benefit was an undeniable accession to wealth, clearly realized, and over which Hornung had complete dominion; and therefore was taxable gross income under section 61 of the tax code.

=== Pertaining to the Fur Stole (Issue 3) ===
The court dispensed of this issue easily by noting that the stole was actually received by Hornung's mother in 1961. Therefore, it did not constitute income in 1962.

== Holding ==
=== Pertaining to the 1962 Corvette (Issue 1) ===
Hornung did not, for income tax purposes, constructively receive the Corvette in 1961, but rather received it in 1962. Because the Corvette was received in 1962, and not excludable from taxable income as a gift or applicable award or prize, the Tax Court held that the value of the car should have been included in Hornung’s gross income for 1962.

=== Pertaining to the 1962 Thunderbirds (Issue 2) ===
The court found that Hornung had not met the burden of proving his use of the Thunderbirds was a gift. Therefore, the economic benefit he received was taxable gross income.

=== Pertaining to the Fur Stoles (Issue 3) ===
The stole was not income to Hornung in 1962, as it was actually received in 1961.
