= Veidt =

Veidt (pronounced [faɪt]) is a German-language surname which may refer to:

== People ==
- Conrad Veidt (1893–1943), German actor
- Karl Veidt (1879–1946), German Lutheran theologian
- Tyson Veidt, American college football coach and former player
- Werner Veidt (1903–1992), German actor and author

== Fictional characters ==
- Adrian Veidt or Ozymandias, in the comic book series Watchmen

== See also ==
- Veit (disambiguation)
