= Nuclear equivalence =

Princple in cell biology

According to the principle of nuclear equivalence, the nuclei of essentially all differentiated adult cells of an individual are genetically (though not necessarily metabolically) identical to one another and to the nucleus of the zygote from which they descended. This means that virtually all somatic cells in an adult have the same genes. However, different cells express different subsets of these genes.

The evidence for nuclear equivalence comes from cases in which differentiated cells or their nuclei have been found to retain the potential of directing the development of the entire organism. Such cells or nuclei are said to exhibit totipotency.
