= Janet Wittes =

American statistician

Janet Turk Wittes
- Education: Radcliffe College, 1964; Harvard University, MA, PhD 1970
- Spouse: Robert E. Wittes
- Children: 3
- Scientific career
- Workplaces: Hunter College; National Cancer Institute; Department of Veterans Affairs; National Heart, Lung and Blood Institute; Statistics Collaborative
- Doctoral advisor: Theodore Colton

Janet Turk Wittes is an American biostatistician and entrepreneur, known for her work on statistical issues in clinical trials. She is the former chief of statistics at the National Heart, Lung and Blood Institute. One of her three children is Benjamin Wittes, legal and national security journalist.

== Education ==
Wittes is the daughter of a chemist and a psychologist. She began her studies at Radcliffe College in the biochemistry program, choosing it over chemistry because of its added opportunities for mentorship. Her faculty mentor, John Tileston Edsall, noting her preference for inference over experiment, guided her to aim for a career in statistics. Towards this goal, Wittes switched her major to mathematics, graduating in 1964.

Wittes stayed at Harvard University for her graduate studies in statistics. At Harvard, she was supported by a fellowship from the United States Public Health Service (chosen because its application form was short) and because of this ended up working in biostatistics. Wittes completed her Ph.D. in 1970; her doctoral advisor was Theodore Colton.

== Career ==
While her husband, physician Robert E. Wittes, served a term in the United States Public Health Service Commissioned Corps, Wittes did part-time postdoctoral research with Jerome Cornfield at the National Cancer Institute. After an additional two years as a part-time instructor of epidemiology at Columbia University, she became a regular-rank faculty member in the mathematics department at Hunter College in 1974 and remained there until 1982.

In 1983 Wittes moved to the National Heart, Lung, and Blood Institute as chief of the Biostatistics Research Branch, and remained there until 1988, when she left because of a change of employment by her husband, and became a biostatistician for the Department of Veterans Affairs in Connecticut from 1989 to 1990.

Upon the family's return to Washington in 1990, and unable to find a suitable government position, Wittes founded a consulting firm, Statistics Collaborative. She ran the company for almost 30 years, focusing on providing specialized biostatistical consulting services to developers of new drugs and biologics, with a focus is on late-stage clinical trials. She worked on trial design, reporting for Data Monitoring Committees, data analysis, and consultation for FDA presentations. In 2020, Wittes sold the company, Statistics Collaborative, to WCG Clinical, Inc.

== Research and Publication ==
Wittes' research focuses on the design of clinical trials, and she has also published on mark and recapture methods. With Michael A. Proschan and K. K. Gordon Lan, she is an author of the book Statistical Monitoring of Clinical Trials: A Unified Approach (Springer, 2006, ISBN 978-0-387-44970-8).

Wittes was president of the Society for Clinical Trials for 2001. She was editor-in-chief of the society's journal Controlled Clinical Trials from 1994 to 1998.

== Recognition ==
Wittes was elected as a Fellow of the American Statistical Association in 1989. She is also a Fellow of the American Association for the Advancement of Science and of the Society for Clinical Trials, and an elected member of the International Statistical Institute

Wittes was the winner of the 2006 Janet L. Norwood Award For Outstanding Achievement By A Woman In The Statistical Sciences. In 2015 the American Statistical Association gave her their W. J. Dixon Award for Excellence in Statistical Consulting "for exceptional contributions to advancing the science and art of statistical consulting and collaboration; for developing innovative, widely used, statistical methodology; for major worldwide accomplishments, especially in the area of clinical trials, including performing creative, easily interpretable interim analyses and serving on numerous data and safety monitoring boards; for extraordinary leadership as president of Statistics Collaborative; and for being a true beacon for integrity."
