= David Feito =

Spanish footballer

Personal information
- Full name: David Feito Vélez
- Date of birth: 19 December 1982 (age 43)
- Place of birth: Coria del Río, Spain
- Height: 1.78 m (5 ft 10 in)
- Position: Left-back

Youth career
- Coria

Senior career*
Years	Team	Apps	(Gls)
2000–2002	Coria	15	(3)
2000–2001	→ Utrera (loan)		
2002–2005	Córdoba B	54	(7)
2002–2004	Córdoba	3	(0)
2003–2004	→ Espanyol B (loan)	2	(0)
2005–2006	Chiclana		
2006	Sangonera	16	(0)
2007	Villanueva	18	(0)
2007–2008	Logroñés	34	(0)
2008–2010	Guadalajara	41	(1)
2010–2011	Universidad LP	30	(4)
2011–2012	Teruel	24	(0)
2012–2013	Coria	35	(6)
2013–2014	Pontevedra	57	(3)
2015–2016	Extremadura	8	(0)
2016	San José Promesas	5	(5)
2016	San Fernando	1	(1)
2016–2017	Arcos	25	(1)
2017–2021	Coria	107	(10)
Total		475	(41)
- * Club domestic league appearances and goals

David Feito Vélez (born 19 December 1982 in Coria del Río, Province of Seville) is a Spanish former footballer who played as a left-back.
