= Gary Herbert Lyman =

American researcher

- Born: United States
- Occupations: Hematologist, medical oncologist, academic and author

Academic background
- Education: Bachelor of Arts; Doctor of Medicine; Master of Public Health
- Alma mater: State University of New York at Buffalo; Harvard University School of Public Health

Gary Herbert Lyman is an American academic hematologist, medical oncologist, and cancer researcher.

Lyman is most known for his efforts in managing the adverse effects of cancer treatment including neutropenia and thrombosis among other toxicities along with establishing the clinical application of colony-stimulating factors and oral anticoagulants. He has also led efforts to address rising health care costs through national policy initiatives, clinical practice guidelines and the clinical integration of biosimilars and other approaches to reducing the financial burden of cancer on patients. His contributions extend to the development and validation of risk prediction models and the application of biomarkers for molecularly targeted therapies. Among his authored works are his publications in academic journals as well as books such as Comprehensive geriatric oncology, Breast cancer : Translational Therapeutic Strategies, Cancer Supportive Care: Advances in Therapeutic Strategies, and Hematopoietic Growth Factors in Oncology. He is a Distinguished Emeritus member of the American Society of Hematology as well as the recipient of the Statesman Award from the American Society of Clinical Oncology.

== Education ==
Lyman earned his B.A. in 1968 from the State University of New York at Buffalo, followed by a Doctor of Medicine degree in 1972 from the same institution. In 1974 he completed an internal medicine residency at the University of North Carolina in Chapel Hill and in 1977 completed his Medical Oncology and Hematology Fellowship at Roswell Park Memorial Institute. In 1982, he obtained a Master of Public Health degree in biostatistics from the Harvard University School of Public Health while completing a Postdoctoral Fellowship under Marvin Zelen.

== Career ==
Lyman began his academic journey in 1974, assuming the role of research instructor in medicine at the State University of New York, Buffalo School of Medicine, serving until 1977. He then became an assistant professor of medicine at the University of South Florida, College of Medicine's Department of Internal Medicine in 1977, becoming an associate professor in 1981. At the University of South Florida, College of Medicine, he served as the director of the Division of Medical Oncology in the Department of Internal Medicine from 1979 to 1993. During this time period, he worked with HL Moffitt and others to help establish the Moffitt Cancer Center opening in 1985 and served as the Chief of Medicine. He was subsequently appointed as a professor of medicine from 1986 to 2000. In 1987, he testified before the US Congress on the value of screening mammography supporting the eventual coverage of screening mammograms by Medicare.

Transitioning to Albany Medical College in 2000, Lyman held the Thomas Ordway Endowed Professorship of Medicine within the Department of Medicine, where he also served as the Cancer Center director and head of the Division of Hematology/Oncology until 2002. Subsequently, he joined the University of Rochester School of Medicine and Dentistry in 2002 as a professor of medicine, serving until 2007. In 2007, he joined the Duke University School of Medicine, where he served as a professor of medicine until 2014 .Subsequently, he has contributed to cancer outcomes research at the Fred Hutchinson Cancer Research Center and the University of Washington (UW) School of Medicine. From 2014 to 2020, he served as a professor in the Public health Sciences Division and served as co-director of the Hutchinson Institute for Cancer Outcomes Research. He is a member of the Fred Hutchinson Cancer Center as well as adjunct professor of medicine at Duke University School of Medicine.

Lyman served on the Oncology Drug Advisory Committee (ODAC) to the US Food and Drug Administration from 2007 to 2013. Between 2000 and 2020, he led a multi-institutional academic-industry research collaboration focused on identifying risk factors and risk reduction strategies for treatment-related hematologic and thromboembolic complications in patients with cancer.

== Works ==
With over 15 authored and edited books, Lyman has made contributions to the field of oncology, with his published research cited more than 93,000 times in the medical literature. In 2004, he co-edited a book titled Comprehensive Geriatric Oncology with Balducci and others. The book provided a review of the effects of age on tolerance of cancer treatments, prevention, treatment strategies, while also analyzing major clinical trials and addressing emerging issues in geriatric oncology, pain control, supportive care, and rehabilitation for elderly cancer patients. His 2007 book Breast Cancer: Translational Therapeutic Strategies serves as a guide covering translational breakthroughs in breast cancer research, including strategies and agents impacting early detection, diagnosis, prevention, and treatment, with a focus on improved patient selection for evolving therapies. His 2008 book Cancer Supportive Care: Advances in Therapeutic Strategies highlighted advances in the prevention and treatment of cancer and cancer treatment related complications. In 2009, his edited work Oxford American Handbook of Oncology was published. The book provides an overview of cancer care, including information on various types of cancer, treatment choices, algorithms, guidelines, and references. Moreover, his 2011 book Hematopoietic Growth Factors in Oncology focused on advancements in supportive care for cancer patients, particularly in managing hematologic toxicities resulting from myelosuppressive chemotherapy, covering topics such as hematopoietic growth factors and their clinical use based on evidence from randomized controlled trials and meta-analyses.

== Research ==
In his early research Lyman investigated how aprotic solvents and divalent cations affect the stability of phospholipid membranes and their correlation with the differentiation of Friend leukemia cells in vitro. In 1980, his RCT investigated the potential of lithium carbonate supplementation to reduce infectious complications and improve outcomes in patients undergoing systemic chemotherapy for small-cell bronchogenic carcinoma. The study demonstrated favorable effects on neutropenia, febrile episodes, infection-related hospitalizations, and blood cell parameters. While lithium proved too toxic, it was associated with increased production of granulocyte colony-stimulating factor (G-CSF) found to be effective clinically in collaboration with J Crawford and others.

In a 1985 study, Lyman and his team reported an association between radium groundwater contamination and the incidence of leukemia in Florida. In 1987 he testified before the US Congress on the risk of indoor radon and the importance of radon testing in homes.

In a 1996 study, along with DS Reintgen, C Cox and others, Lyman demonstrated through a prospective trial that lymphatic mapping in invasive breast cancer accurately identifies sentinel lymph nodes, offering potential benefits for staging accuracy and focused histologic examination. His 2001 collaborative study with C M Balch and others presented AJCC's proposed revisions to melanoma staging based on extensive analysis of data from multiple cancer centers. The study identified key prognostic factors such as tumor thickness, ulceration, nodal involvement, and metastasis type to improve the accuracy of staging and prognosis in cutaneous melanoma. His 2005 research in collaboration with AE Giuliano and others advocated for sentinel node biopsy (SNB) as the preferred option over routine axillary lymph node dissection (ALND) for early-stage breast cancer patients with negative axillary nodes, stressing its safety, accuracy, and the necessity of ALND if metastases are found.

In 2008, with colleagues including AA Khorana, NM Kuderer, and others, Lyman and his team developed and presented a predictive model for chemotherapy-associated venous thromboembolism in cancer outpatients based on five clinical and laboratory variables. Furthermore, his 2020 joint study led by NM Kuderer, he provided important insights into the outcomes of COVID-19 in patients with cancer and identified factors associated with mortality, providing valuable information for clinical management and future research. In his later work with NM Kuderer and others, he provided a review of chemotherapy-associated adverse events, discussing their biological mechanisms, available treatment strategies, evidence-based guidelines, risk factors, validated assessment tools, and emerging supportive-care opportunities for cancer patients and survivors.

== Awards and honors ==
- 1972 – Bernhardt and Sophie B. Gottlieb Award, State University of New York
- 1976 – Special Fellow Award, Leukemia Society of America
- 1977 – Special Clinical Fellow Award, Roswell Park Memorial Institute
- 1999 – Thomas C. Chalmers Award, VII Cochrane Colloquium
- 2010 – Statesman Award, American Society of Clinical Oncology

== Bibliography ==
=== Books ===
- Translational Therapeutic Strategies in Breast Cancer (2007) ISBN 9780849374166
- Cancer Supportive Care: Advances in Therapeutic Strategies (2008) ISBN 9781420052893
- Oxford American Handbook of Oncology (2009) ISBN 9780195369496
- Hematopoietic Growth Factors in Oncology (2010) ISBN 9781441970732

=== Selected articles ===
- Lyman GH, Preisler HD, Papahadjopoulos D (1976): Membrane Action of Dimethylsulfoxide and Other Chemical Inducers of Friend Leukemic Cell Differentiation. Nature. 262:361–363.
- Lyman GH, Lyman CG, Johnson W: Association of Leukemia with Radium Groundwater Contamination,(1985) J Am Med Assoc, 254:621–626.
- Khorana AA, Kuderer NM, Culakova E, Lyman GH, Francis CW: Development and validation of a predictive model for chemotherapy-associated thrombosis.(2008) Blood;111(10):4902–4907.
- Kuderer NM, Choueiri TK, Shah DP, Shyr Y, Rubinstein SM, Rivera DR, Lyman GH*, Rini BI*, Warner JL*; Clinical impact of COVID-19 on patients with cancer (CCC19): a cohort study (2020) The Lancet; 395: 1907–1918
- Lyman GH*, Carrier M*, Ay C, Dinisio M, Hicks L, Khorana A,...Pablo Alonso-Coello17 American Society of Hematology 2020 Guidelines for Management of Venous Thromboembolism: Prevention and Treatment in Patients with Cancer.(2021) Blood Advances; 5:927–974.
- Kuderer NM, Desai A, Lustberg MB, Lyman GH: Mitigating acute chemotherapy-associated adverse events in patients with cancer.(2022) Nat Rev Clin Oncol. 19: 681–697.
