= Veit v. Commissioner =

US tax court case

- Court: United States Tax Court
- Full case name: Howard Veit v. Commissioner of Internal Revenue
- Decided: April 14, 1947; October 11, 1949
- Citations: 8 T.C. 809; 8 T.C.M. 919

Court membership
- Judge sitting: Luther Alexander Johnson

Keywords
- Constructive receipt

The United States Tax Court decided two cases, both titled Veit v. Commissioner, in 1947 and 1949. These cases deal with the doctrine of constructive receipt. In both cases, the taxpayer was an executive vice president of a corporation. He was entitled to a fixed salary plus a bonus of 10% of the corporation's profits for the years 1939 and 1940, with the bonus to be paid in 1941. However, his contract was revised in November 1940 to provide that the bonus from the 1939 profits would be paid in 1941, and the bonus from the 1940 profits would be paid in 1942.

In Veit I, the first of the two cases, the IRS objected to the new contract, claiming that the bonus from the 1940 profits was constructively received in 1941 and thus should have been included as part of the taxpayer's gross income for 1941, rather than 1942. The Tax Court disagreed, finding that the November 1940 agreement was "an arm's length business transaction . . . mutually profitable" to both the corporation and the taxpayer. Only if deferral of the 1940 bonus were "a mere subterfuge and sham" to allow the taxpayer to postpone paying income tax on the bonus could the court have found constructive receipt, it said, and there was no evidence of such intent. In fact, it was apparent that deferral was a common practice for this corporation, and it was the corporation's idea, not the taxpayer's. The court found for the taxpayer.

At issue in Veit II was a further agreement, entered into in December 1941, allowing the 1940 bonus to be paid in five equal installments annually from 1942 to 1946, instead of the entire amount in 1942. Again, the IRS objected to the deferral of the payment, and again, the Tax Court found for the taxpayer. The deferral was at the request of the corporation, and the full amount of the bonus was never "unqualifiedly subject to [the taxpayer's] demand or withdrawal."
