= Feit–Thompson =

Feit–Thompson may refer to these concepts in number theory named after Walter Feit and John G. Thompson :

- Feit–Thompson conjecture
- Feit–Thompson theorem or odd order theorem, mathematical theorem stating that every finite group of odd order is solvable
