= John Cowden =

American television executive (1917–2006)

John Peter Cowden
- Born: March 12, 1917; Santa Barbara, California
- Died: November 4, 2006 (aged 89); Santa Rosa, California
- Occupation(s): Vice President and Assistant President of CBS

John Peter Cowden (12 March 1917 – 4 November 2006), also known as Jack Cowden, was a broadcast executive. His career began in 1926 as a child actor for NBC. He was an actor in a number of radio programs, including "Little Orphan Annie", where he played Joe Corntassle with the San Francisco cast.

In 1938, he switched to the business side of broadcasting when he joined CBS in New York. Over the next 40 years, he served in various positions in the company's radio and television networks. In 1959, he was appointed Vice President of Information Services of the CBS Television Network with Advertising, Research and Publicity departments reporting to him. In 1972 his title and responsibilities were expanded to Vice President and Assistant to the President in which he served until his retirement in 1978.

Cowden served in the US Army in New Caledonia, the Philippines and Japan, where he was feature editor of the Pacific Stars and Stripes in 1944–45. He was a graduate of the University of California, Berkeley, class of 1938.
