= Veith =

Veith is a surname. Notable people with the surname include:

- Andrew Veith (born 1991), American climber, producer, and writer
- Anna Veith (born 1989), Austrian alpine ski racer
- Bob Veith (1926–2006), American racing driver
- Gene Edward Veith (born 1951), American author and scholar
- Ilza Veith (1912–2013), German-born American historian of medicine
- Johann Veith (1916–1945), German SS officer
- Johann Emanuel Veith (1787–1876), Czech Roman Catholic priest
- Michael Veith (born 1957), German alpine skier
- Michael Veith (biologist) (born 1957), German biologist
- Michael Veight (chemist) born 1944), German chemist
- Oswin Veith (born 1961), German politician (CSU)
- Robin Veith, American television writer
- Walter Veith, South African zoologist and Seventh-day Adventist lay preacher
