= Doctrine of cash equivalence =

The Doctrine of Cash Equivalence states that the U.S. Federal income tax law treats certain non-cash payment transactions like cash payment transactions for federal income tax purposes. The doctrine is used most often for deciding when cash method (as opposed to accrual method) taxpayers are to include certain non-cash income items. Another doctrine often used when trying to determine the timing of the inclusion of income is the constructive receipt doctrine.

Most individuals begin as cash method taxpayers because their first form of bookkeeping is a checkbook. In contrast, some businesses start as accrual method taxpayers because businesses use different rules for recording income and expenditures. The Internal Revenue Code (IRC) § 446(a) states, however, that "[t]axable income shall be computed under the method of accounting on the basis which the taxpayer regularly computes his income in keeping his books."

One of the major advantages to the cash method of accounting is the ability to defer taxation because the recognition of income applicable to amounts in accounts receivable can be deferred to a later year. The Doctrine of Cash Equivalence is important because many people are cash method taxpayers and would be subject to this rule.

== Elements ==
Cash method taxpayers include income items (cash and cash equivalents) in the year the items are received. See also Treasury Regulations Certain payment transactions involve cash equivalents, such as receipts of checks and credit card payments. The cash equivalence doctrine arose out of a need to determine whether certain items that were either actually or constructively received must be accrued as income. A dispute over timing of income recognition for tax purposes may arise when the thing received is really not much more than a promise of payment, such as a promissory note or a bond. If mere promises to pay were considered cash equivalents, then there would be little difference between the cash and accrual methods for tax purposes.

The United States Court of Appeals for the Fifth Circuit established the standard for applying the cash equivalence doctrine to promises of payment. The court first noted that the principle that "[a] promissory note, negotiable in form, is not necessarily the equivalent of cash" remains true. But that principle also has a true inverse—that a non-negotiable instrument can be a cash equivalent if the following factors are met. A promise to pay will be considered a cash equivalent for cash method taxpayers if:

- the promise to pay is unconditional;
- the promise is made by a solvent person;
- the promise is assignable;
- the promise is not subject to set-offs; and
- the promise is marketable.

Since taxpayers generally prefer to defer recognition of income to subsequent tax years (due to the time value of money), a finding of cash equivalence will typically be to the disadvantage of the individual taxpayer.

== Mechanics ==
To use the doctrine of cash equivalence, a taxpayer must have either actually received an item, or constructively received an item. If either of these situations exist, a taxpayer must determine whether the item received is cash equivalence, using the six factors described in Cowden v. Commissioner. If the item is deemed cash equivalent, then the taxpayer has income. If it is not cash equivalent, the taxpayer does not have income.
