= Steven Heller (design writer) =

American art historian (born 1950)

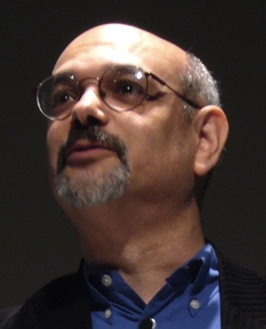
- Steven Heller
- Born: July 7, 1950 (age 76); New York City
- Occupations: Writer and design historian
- Spouse: Louise Fili
- Children: Nicolas Heller

Steven Heller (born July 7, 1950) is an American art director, journalist, critic, author, and editor who specializes in topics related to graphic design.

== Biography ==
=== Early life and education ===
Steven Heller was born July 7, 1950, in New York City, to Bernice and Milton Heller. He attended the Walden School, a progressive college preparatory school on the Upper West Side of Manhattan, as well as military school. In 1968, he enrolled at New York University with a major in English, later transferring to the School of Visual Arts illustration and cartoon program without graduation from either.

=== Art director ===
In 1968, his leftist leanings attracted him to the Free Press, a New York underground newspaper, where he became art director at age 17 in spite of his lack of a formal art education or other credentials, later attending some New York University lectures utilizing his press pass. He met illustrator Brad Holland, who convinced him that page layouts and type choices mattered, with which Heller was previously unconcerned. After working for a year at the Free Press, he moved on to various publications, including two years at the pornography tabloid Screw.

In 1974, Heller became the youngest art director for The New York Times Op-Ed page, replacing Jean-Claude Suares. His interest in illustration employed on the Op-Ed page led him to publish collections on the subject. He became the art director of The New York Times Book Review in 1977.

In the 1980s, he became interested in design through friendships with Seymour Chwast and Louise Fili, who he later married, as well as becoming the editor of the AIGA Journal of Graphic Design. Under his lead, the Journal became a place of scrutinized design writing, inviting authors from a variety of professions and supporting the careers of fledgling critics, who documented design writing.

In 2007, he began a transition from his 30-year career at the New York Times. The changes created a lot of stress, and his Parkinson's disease was either triggered or exacerbated.

=== Educator ===
In the late 1960s, after leaving SVA, Heller was hired to teach a newspaper design class.

In 1984, he helped create the master's program for illustration at the School of Visual Arts. In 1998, Heller and Lita Talarico co-founded the MFA Design Program, the school's first graduate program in design. In 2008, Heller co-founded SVA's MFA in Design Criticism program (D-Crit) with Alice Twemlow. The program was intended to help non-designers find a place in the design field.

As of 2019, he served on the faculty of the School of Visual Arts (SVA) as co-chair of the MFA Design Department, special assistant to the president, and co-founder of the MFA Design Criticism, MPS Branding, MFA Interaction Design, MFA Products of Design programs. Heller's pupils have included Deborah Adler.

In 2024, he and Talarico retired as co-chairs of SVA's MFA Design Program, succeeded by Randy J. Hunt.

== Awards and recognition ==
In 1996, he was inducted into the Art Directors Club Hall of Fame. In 1999, Heller received an AIGA Medal for what designer Paula Scher described as "lifetime achievement that comes from a workday existing roughly between 4:30 and 8:45 A.M. ... before a full workday at the [New York] Times [Book Review]". The Society of Illustrators honored Heller with the Richard Gangel Art Director Award in 2005. In 2017, the AIGA named an award, the Steven Heller Prize for Cultural Commentary, in his honor, citing his three decades of contributions to cultural discourse on design. In 2011, was awarded the Design Mind Award by the National Design Museum.

== Writing ==
Heller has said he writes so that he "can further discover and share what I've learned with others" and as a way to study topics he is curious about, notably the emergence of right- and left-wing tyrannies and pre-World War II totalitarianism. The subjects he writes about are seen through the lens of graphic design and are motivated by not being able to sleep and how design manipulates and communicates.

=== Articles ===
Heller is author and co-author of many works on the history of illustration, typography, and many subjects related to graphic design. He has published more than eighty titles and written articles for magazines including Affiche, Baseline, Creation, Design, Design Issues, Design Observer, Eye, Graphis, How, I.D., Oxymoron, Mother Jones, The New York Times Book Review, Print, Speak, and U&lc magazine. For thirty-three years Heller was a senior art director of U&lc magazine, a publication devoted to typography.

=== Books (partial list) ===
Heller has written, co-authored, and/or edited more than 130 books about design and popular culture. He worked with Seymour Chwast to create Push Pin Editions and more than 20 books for Chronicle Books with his wife, Louise Fili.

- Innovators of American illustration, Steven Heller. 1986.
- Design Culture: An Anthology of Writing from the AIGA Journal of Graphic Design, Marie Finamore, Steven Heller. 1997.
- Sourcebook of Visual Ideas, Steven Heller, Seymour Chwast. 1989.
- Designing With Illustration, Steven Heller, Karen Pomeroy. 1990.
- Borrowed Design: Use and Abuse of Historical Form, Steven Heller, Julie Lasky. 1993.
- Italian Art Deco: Graphic Design Between the Wars, Steven Heller, Louise Fili. 1993.
- Streamline: American Art Deco Graphic Design, Steven Heller, Louise Fili. 1995.
- Japanese Modern: Graphic Design Between the Wars, James Fraser, Steven Heller, Seymour Chwast. 1996.
- Design Literacy (Continued): Understanding Graphic Design, Steven Heller. 1999.
- Paul Rand, Steven Heller, Paul Rand, Jessica Helfand. 1999
- Anatomy of Design: Uncovering the Influences and Inspiration in Modern Graphic Design, Steven Heller, Mirko Ilic. 1999.
- Typology: Type Design from the Victorian Era to the Digital Age, Steven Heller, Louise Fili. 1999.
- British Modern: Graphic Design Between the Wars, Steven Heller, Louise Fili. 2001.
- Red Scared!: The Commie Menace in Propaganda and Popular Culture, Michael Barson, Steven Heller. 2001.
- This Way - That Way: Prints + Posters Exhibitions + Environments, Keith Godard, Edwin Schlossberg, Steven Heller. 2001.
- Design Humor: The Art of Graphic Wit, Steven Heller. 2002.
- Citizen Designer: Perspectives on Design Responsibility, Steven Heller, Veronique Vienne. 2003.
- Teaching Graphic Design: Course Offerings and Class Projects from the Leading Graduate and Undergraduate Programs, Steven Heller. 2003.
- Design Literacy: Understanding Graphic Design, Steven Heller. 2004.
- Inside the Business of Illustration, Steven Heller, Marshall Arisman. 2004.
- Times Square Style: Graphics from the Great White Way, Vicki Gold Levi, Steven Heller. 2004.
- Euro Deco: Graphic Design Between the Wars, Steven Heller, Louise Fili. 2005.
- Nigel Holmes: On Information Design, Steven Heller, Nigel Holmes. 2006.
- Stylepedia: A Guide to Graphic Design Mannerisms, Quirks, and Conceits, Steven Heller, Louise Fili. 2006.
- Design Disasters: Great Designers, Fabulous Failure, and Lessons Learned, Steven Heller. 2008.
- Design Entrepreneur: Turning Graphic Design Into Goods That Sell, Steven Heller, Lita Talarico. 2008.
- Design School Confidential: Extraordinary Class Projects From the International Design Schools, Colleges, and Institutes, Steven Heller, Lita Talarico. 2009.
- Becoming a Graphic Designer: A Guide to Careers in Design, Steven Heller, Teresa Fernandes. 2010.
- The Swastika: Symbol Beyond Redemption?, Steven Heller. 2010.
- Becoming a Digital Designer: A Guide to Careers in Web, Video, Broadcast, Game and Animation Design, Steven Heller, David Womack. 2011.
- Design School: Extraordinary Class Projects From International Design Schools, Steven Heller, Lita Talarico. 2011.
- Heller, Steven (2012). Comics Sketchbooks: The Private Worlds of Today's Most Creative Talents. Thames & Hudson. ISBN 978-0500289945.
- Graphic Design Reader, Steven Heller. 2012.
- Stop, Think, Go, Do: How Typography and Graphic Design Influence Behavior, Steven Heller, Mirko Ilic. 2012.
- Design Firms Open for Business, Steven Heller, Lita Talarico. 2013.
- Lettering Large: Art and Design of Monumental Typography, Steven Heller, Mirko Ilić. 2013.
- Writing and Research for Graphic Designers: A Designer's Manual to Strategic Communication and Presentation, Steven Heller. 2013.
- Becoming a Graphic and Digital Designer: A Guide to Careers in Design, Steven Heller, Veronique Vienne. 2015.
- Graphic Style Lab: Develop Your Own Style with 50 Hands-On Exercises, Steven Heller. 2015.
- Becoming a Design Entrepreneur: How to Launch Your Design-Driven Ventures from Apps to Zines, Lita Talarico, Steven Heller. 2016.
- Graphic Design Rants and Raves: Bon Mots on Persuasion, Entertainment, Education, Culture, and Practice, Steven Heller. 2017.
- The Design of Dissent, Expanded Edition: Greed, Nationalism, Alternative Facts, and the Resistance, Milton Glaser, Mirko Ilic, Tony Kushner, Steven Heller. 2017.
- The Moderns: Midcentury American Graphic Design, Steven Heller, Greg D'Onofrio. 2017.
- 100 Ideas that Changed Graphic Design, Steven Heller, Veronique Vienne. 2019.
- Teaching Graphic Design History, Steven Heller. 2019.
- Growing Up Underground: A Memoir of Counterculture New York, Steven Heller. 2022.

== Exhibitions (as curator) ==
- The Art of Simplicisimus (The Goethe House)
- The Malik Verlag (The Goethe House)
- Political Art: Ten Years of Graphic Commentary (AIGA)
- L'Assiette au Beurre (The French Institute)
- Cartoonists for a Nuclear Freeze (Marymount College)
- The Art of Satire (Pratt Graphic Center)
- Graphic Jesters: Two Generations (Schiller Wapner Gallery)
- Art Against War (Parsons School of Design)
- Typographic Treasures: The Work of W.A. Dwiggins (ITC Gallery)
- Push Pin Studio Retrospective (Cooper Union)

== See also ==
- First Things First 2000 manifesto
