= Jody Williams (disambiguation) =

Jody Williams (born 1950) is an American teacher and aid worker who received the 1997 Nobel Peace Prize

Jody Williams may also refer to:

- Jody Williams (Afrikaans singer) (born 1990), South African Pop/R&B singer better known as Jody
- Jody Williams (artist) (1956–2023), American artist
- Jody Williams (blues musician) (1935–2018), American blues guitarist and singer
- Jody Williams (chef) (born 1963), American chef and television personality

== See also ==
- Jodie Williams (born 1993), British sprinter
