= Louise Fili =

American graphic designer (born 1951)

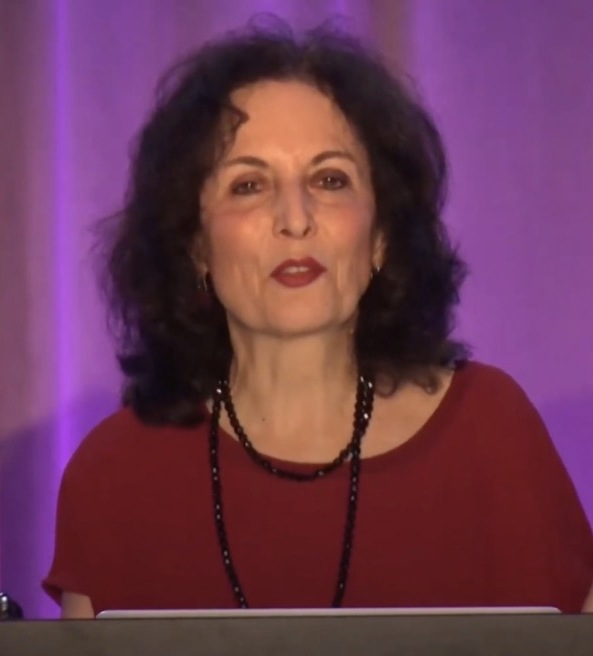
- Fili at TypeCon 2018 conference in Portland, Oregon
- Born: April 12, 1951 (age 75); Orange, New Jersey, U.S.
- Known for: Graphic design
- Spouse: Steven Heller
- Children: Nicolas Heller
- Awards: Art Directors Club Gold Medal, Society of Illustrators Gold Medal, AIGA Medal, Frederic W. Goudy Award
- Website: www.louisefili.com

Louise Fili (born April 12, 1951) is an American graphic designer and artist known for her use of typography. Her work incorporates elements of modernism and European Art Deco, combining historical typography with contemporary design approaches. Fili designed nearly 2,000 book jackets while working at Random House. Since establishing her design studio, she has shifted her focus towards restaurant identity, food-related logos, and packaging. Fili currently teaches at the School of Visual Arts in New York City and has previously taught at The New School, New York University, and Cooper Union.

== Early life ==
Fili was born on April 12, 1951, in Orange, New Jersey to Italian immigrants, who worked as school teachers. Fili mentioned she was “interested in design before [she] even knew what it was.” As a child, she carved letterforms into her walls, designed book covers, and created illuminated manuscripts of Bob Dylan lyrics. When she was 16, Fili taught herself calligraphy using a Speedball guide and an Osmiroid pen.

== Education ==
Fili attended Skidmore College in Saratoga Springs, New York to study studio art. In 1973, she received a Bachelor of Science in studio art from Skidmore. Her senior project was an Italian hand-lettered cookbook. Fili moved to New York City, in 1973, interning at the Museum of Modern Art and finishing the last semester of her degree at the School of Visual Arts.

== Career ==
After graduating, Fili began her career as a freelance designer of special project books at Alfred A. Knopf from 1975 to 1976. At 25, she was hired as a senior designer for Herb Lubalin, where she remained from 1976 to 1978. There, she began using typography as an expressive tool, setting the foundation for her later work.

In 1978, Fili joined Random House as the art director at Pantheon Books, where she rejected standard fonts to create bespoke typographic treatments for each book jacket. Her approach extended to the physical surface treatment as well, favoring softer and more durable matte coatings over standard shiny finishes. She stated in a 2018 interview: "I was on a mission to prove that you didn’t have to shout to capture someone’s attention. The cover that I did for The Lover, by Marguerite Duras, was probably the best example of that." The success of her jacket for Duras' bestseller, The Lover, in 1984 allowed her increased creative freedom at Pantheon. Fili designed close to 2,000 books during her tenure at the publisher.

In 1989, she opened her studio, Louise Fili Ltd., specializing in the design of restaurant identity, food-related logos, and food packaging. During that time, there were few female-run companies, which meant naming the company after herself could be a liability. Speaking of the experience in a later interview, Fili said she wanted to send out a clear message with her studio name: "If you have a problem with my being female, then I don’t want you as a client.” She has designed for many New York City eateries such as Pearl Oyster Bar, Picholine, Artisanal, The Mermaid Inn, and Via Carota. She also created packaging for Sarabeth's jam, Tate's cookies, and Bella Cucina. Her geometric, often Cubist-like designs show an affinity to European Modernism, particularly the work of Lucian Bernhard, A.M. Cassandre, Jean Carlu, and Italian posters of the 1930s.

In 2000, she received three James Beard Award nominations, and since 1998, she has been an elected member of the Alliance Graphique Internationale. In 2004, Fili was inducted into the Art Directors Club Hall of Fame. In 2015, she received the Medal of Lifetime Achievement from the Type Directors Club. In 2021, she was recognized for her contributions to typography with the Frederic W. Goudy Award, one of the highest honors in typography.

Fili has authored and co-authored over twenty books, many of them with her husband, the design historian Steven Heller. A monograph of her work, Elegantissima, was published in 2012.

In 2025, she designed the poster for the twentififth National Book Festival.

== Personal life ==
Fili married design writer and art director Steven Heller in 1983, after receiving a fan letter from him a year earlier. Their son, Nicholas Heller, is a filmmaker and social media personality known as “New York Nico”.

== Bibliography ==
- Italian Art Deco: Graphic Design Between the Wars, San Francisco: Chronicle Books, 1993 (with Steven Heller)
- Dutch Moderne: Graphic Design from De Stijl to Deco, San Francisco: Chronicle Books, 1994 (with Steven Heller)
- Streamline: American Art Deco Graphic Design, San Francisco: Chronicle Books, 1995 (with Steven Heller)
- Cover Story: The Art of American Magazine Covers 1900–1950, San Francisco: Chronicle Books (San Francisco, California), 1996 (with Steven Heller)
- Logos A to Z (self-published) 1997
- British Modern: Graphic Design Between the Wars, San Francisco: Chronicle Books, 1998 (with Steven Heller)
- German Modern: Graphic Design from Wilhelm to Weimar, San Francisco: Chronicle Books, 1998 (with Steven Heller)
- Typology: Type Design from the Victorian Era to the Digital Age, San Francisco: Chronicle Books, 1999 (with Steven Heller)
- More Logos A to Z (self-published) 1999
- Design Connoiseur: An Eclectic Collection of Imagery and Type, New York: Allworth Press, 2000 (with Steven Heller)
- Counter Culture: The Allure of Mini-mannequins, New York: Princeton Architectural Press, 2001 (with Steven Heller)
- Logos A to Z Three, 2002 (self-published)
- Euro Deco: Graphic Design Between the Wars, San Francisco: Chronicle Books, 2004 (with Steven Heller)
- A Designer’s Guide to Italy. 2004 (self-published)
- Stylepedia: A Guide to Graphic Design Mannerisms, Quirks, and Conceits, San Francisco: Chronicle Books, 2006 (with Steven Heller)
- The Civilized Shopper’s Guide to Florence, New York: The Little Bookroom, 2007
- Italianissimo: The Quintessential Guide to What Italians Do Best, New York: The Little Bookroom, 2008 (with Lise Apatoff)
- Scripts: Elegant Lettering from Design’s Golden Age, London: Thames and Hudson, 2011 (with Steven Heller)
- Elegantissima: The Design and Typography of Louise Fili, New York: Princeton Architectural Press, 2012
- "Shadow Type: Classic Three-Dimensional Lettering", London: Thames and Hudson, 2013 (with Steven Heller)
- Grafica della Strada, Princeton Architectural Press, 2014
- The Cognoscenti's Guide to Florence, Princeton Architectural Press, 2015
- "Stencil Type", London: Thames and Hudson, 2015 (with Steven Heller)
- Graphique de la Rue, Princeton Architectural Press, 2015
- Slab Serif Type', London: Thames and Hudson, 2016 (with Steven Heller)
- The Cognoscenti's Guide to Florence: Shop and Eat Like a Florentine, Revised Edition, Princeton Architectural Press, 2017
- Grafica de les Rambles: The Signs of Barcelona, Princeton Architectural Press, 2017
- Louise Fili: A Designer’s Process, Princeton Architectural Press, 2021

== Typefaces ==
- Mardell, an Italian Futurist-inspired typeface designed for the Hamilton Wood Type Museum and made as both a digital font and as wood type.
- Montecatini, was inspired by the Stile Liberty travel posters of Italy in the early 1900s.
- Marseille, an Art Deco-inspired typeface with a distinctive flair that exudes La Belle France.

== Honors ==
- James Beard Foundation Award, Outstanding Restaurant Graphics, Nominee, 1998, 1999, 2000
- Art Directors Club Hall of Fame, inducted 2004
- Gold Medal, Art Directors Club
- Silver Medal, Art Directors Club
- Gold Medal, Society of Illustrators
- Premio Grafico, Bologna Book Fair
- National Endowment for the Arts grant (with Steven Heller)
- AIGA Medal, 2014
- Type Directors Club Medal of Excellence, 2015
- SVA Master Series Award and Exhibition, 2016
- Frederic W. Goudy Award for Excellence in Typography, 2021

== Permanent collections ==
Fili's work is held in the following permanent collections:

- Library of Congress
- Smithsonian Cooper-Hewitt, National Design Museum
- Bibliothèque nationale
