= Brad Holland (artist) =

American artist (1943–2025)

- Born: Bradford Wayne Holland; October 16, 1943; Fremont, Ohio, U.S.
- Died: March 27, 2025 (aged 81); New York City, U.S.
- Known for: Illustration, fine art
- Awards: Illustrators Hall of Fame, 2005; Hamilton King Award, 1991; 25 gold medals, Society of Illustrators
- Website: www.bradholland.net

Bradford Wayne Holland (October 16, 1943 – March 27, 2025) was an American artist. His work has appeared in Time, Vanity Fair, The New Yorker, Playboy, Rolling Stone, The New York Times, and many other national and international publications. His paintings have been exhibited in museums around the world, including one-man exhibitions at the Musée des Beaux-Arts, Clermont-Ferrand, France and the Museum of American Illustration, New York City.

== Early life ==
Born in Fremont, Ohio, Holland began sending drawings to Walt Disney and The Saturday Evening Post at the age of 15. At 17, after receiving a box of his drawings back from Disney with a Mickey Mouse masthead rejection letter as well as numerous rejection letters from The Saturday Evening Post, Holland traveled by bus to Chicago where he found odd jobs, including sweeping the floor of a tattoo parlor. At age 20 the artist was hired by Hallmark in Kansas City to illustrate books as a staff artist. Among the books he would illustrate for Hallmark was A Christmas Carol by Charles Dickens. In 1967 at age 23, Holland moved to New York City to pursue a career as a full-time freelance illustrator.

== Career ==
Although Holland's first prominent editorial art work appeared in Avant-Garde magazine in 1968 under the art direction of Herb Lubalin, the two significant milestones in Holland's early career were becoming a regular contributor to Playboy starting in 1967 and in 1970 establishing himself as a frequent contributor to The New York Times op-ed page. At Playboy, his talent was first recognized by art director Art Paul, who after seeing the artists work invited him to become a monthly contributor. Hollands' monthly contributions to Playboy accompanied the Ribald Classics series. At The New York Times, Holland was brought in by Jean-Claude Suares, the first art director of the op-ed page and who is credited with bringing the first works of illustration to the editorial page of The New York Times. Holland's contributions to the Times op-ed page were seen as a fundamental shift in how illustration could be used in print, as more often than not Holland treated the art and text as two separate elements.

In 1969 Holland and Steven Heller founded the short-lived Asylum Press, created to represent and promote the work of artists and designers to underground and alternative press resources. After the failure of the New York Review of Sex, Heller became the art director of Screw: The Sex Review, for which Holland did some covers.

Holland's drawings, in particular those about the Nixon administration's Watergate scandal, became the single largest body of work to be published in the first book of op-ed art: The Art of the Times, edited by Jean-Claude Suares and published in 1973 by Darien House. In the same year, Holland would accompany Suares when the art director arranged an exhibition of op-ed art from the Times at the Musée des Arts Décoratifs in Paris.

By 1986, the artist was so firmly established as a prominent presence in the graphics community that The Washington Post said Holland was "the undisputed star of American Illustration". Writing for Print magazine, author Steven Heller wrote, "As Pollock redefined plastic art, Holland has radically changed the perception of illustration".

=== Influences ===
In Holland's ink drawings, which were most prominently featured on the op-ed page of The New York Times, the artist has credited German satirist Heinrich Kley and Austrian expressionist Alfred Kubin as having significantly informed his own black-and-white work. The artist also sites Mexican muralism of the 1920s as being of significant inspiration and in particular "Los Tres Grandes" (the three great ones): Rivera, Orozco and Siqueiros. The artist also credits the short story writings of Nathaniel Hawthorne as having influenced his sensibilities.

== Artistic philosophy ==
While the use of visual metaphor is now taken for granted in the world of illustration, when Holland entered the field this was not the case. It was the accepted standard of the time (1968) that art directors dictated or implied what they wanted an illustrator to create as a finished assignment. When Holland entered the illustration field, his philosophy was entirely different from what his predecessors had accepted as common practice. He vowed to never render anyone else's idea but rather always find a better, more personal solution to any illustration assignment he might accept. There are several illustrators whose work brought about a fundamental and lasting change in this dictatorial method of art direction and Holland can be counted among the first. The New York Times art director Jean-Claude Suares can also take a great deal of credit in this fundamental curatorial change to the way that illustration was viewed from a top-down "do as you are told" profession to a more artist-driven form of artistic communication. In the New York Times' obituary for Suares, Holland is quoted as saying he (Suares) "gave us an opportunity to redefine what graphic art could be and do".

When Holland first worked with Harrison Salisbury at The New York Times, he said "imagine you've locked the writer in one room and me in another and given us both the same assignment. The writer will give you an article, I'll give you a picture; you marry the two." Because of Hollands' artistic philosophy of the time, the long-standing assumption that commercial illustration should simply reinforce the text was to quickly come to an end and his artistic legacy would be largely founded on those historical milestones.

By the mid-1970s Holland's use of visual metaphor, known by this point as "conceptual illustration", was so firmly established and pervasive that op-ed art director Steven Heller said that only 25 percent of op-ed artists knew the content of the articles their work was to accompany.

== Artist advocacy ==
=== The IPA ===
In 1999, Holland and a small group of artists founded The Illustrators' Partnership of America (IPA). The initial goal of the IPA was to heighten artistic awareness regarding the growing influence of stock illustration houses, and how those businesses might potentially devalue art by offering art buyers the on-demand opportunity to purchase rights to art works for pennies on the dollar, compared to what they were previously accustomed to paying. The IPA viewed the rise of stock illustration as the single most destructive development in the history of the commercial art profession. The solution to this as advocated by Holland and the IPA was a rights management agency run by artists that could co-exist with labor and antitrust laws.

=== The ASIP ===
In 2007, The American Society of Illustrators Partnership (ASIP) was established as an initiative of The Illustrators' Partnership of America with Holland as a founding board member. The primary stated purpose of the ASIP was to educate its members and others regarding the rights of illustrators to receive royalties and licensing fees for the use of their work.

=== Orphaned works ===
In 2008, Holland and fellow Illustration Partnership of America (IPA) board member Cynthia Turner submitted comments to The Committee on the Judiciary, regarding The Orphan Works Bill of 2008 and its potential threat to artist rights. While the bill did pass the Senate, and gained wide support in the publishing community it lost support in the House of Representatives and failed passage.

As an indirect consequence of the IPA involvement in the Orphaned Works Bill of 2008, the IPA was sued for one million dollars in 2008 for defamation by the Graphic Artists Guild (GAG), with Holland listed as the primary defendant. The GAG asserted claims for defamation and interference with contractual relations, alleging that IPA had interfered with a "business relationship" GAG had entered into that enabled GAG to collect orphaned reproduction royalties derived from the licensing of illustrators' work. GAG alleged that efforts by IPA to create a collecting society to return lost royalties to artists "interfered" with GAG's "business" of collecting these orphaned fees. Regarding a primary issue in the lawsuit: that GAG had appropriated over one and a half million dollars of illustrators' royalties "surreptitiously", the judge presiding over the case ruled that the statement by IPA was true, and that a defamation case could not go forward based on a statement of fact. The case against IPA and Holland was over-turned. In 2000 the GAG had awarded Holland the Walter Hortens Distinguished Service Award for his articles and speeches on the effects of stock illustration agencies on the freelance illustration business.

In 2012, the U.S Copyright Office engaged the Orphan Works issue again, specifically Orphaned Works and Mass Digitization. Holland and fellow IPA board Member Cynthia Turner once again represented the IPA by reiterating their earlier stance that copyright reform advocates are doing so because they wish to see nation's copyright wealth transfer from individuals to a few select corporations.

== Later life and death ==
Holland died of complications from heart surgery at a hospital in Manhattan, New York City, on March 27, 2025, at the age of 81.

== Select works ==
Editorial

- 1980 Time Person of the Year, Ayatullah Khomeini, which former Time art director Arthur Hochstein selected as one of the top six Time Person of the Year covers.
- 13-cent stamp honoring Chief Crazy Horse, issued January 15, 1982.
- A long-time relationship with the Odeon Theatre in Vienna, creating many of the companies posters as well the cover of their large format art book Serapions Fabel.
- Outside The Dog Museum book cover. Published by Mcmillan 2005
- Where's My Vote? Poster for Iran Green Movement

Album Covers

- The Bridge by Billy Joel, 1986
- Champs du Possible by Bernard Lavilliers
- Above and Below by Leon Parker, 1994
- Jelly Roll Morton, 1984
- Texas Flood by Stevie Ray Vaughan and Double Trouble, 1983 File:StevieRayVaughanTexasFlood.jpg

Book Covers

- La notte di Q by Michael Reynolds, 2006
- Othello a Parallel Text by William Shakespeare, Wim Coleman, 2003

== Bibliography ==
=== As author and illustrator ===
- Dark to Light, Orecchio Acerbo, 2006
- Human Scandals published by Crowell (1977)

=== As illustrator ===
- The Geek by Craig Nova Published by Harper (1975)
- La Notte di Q (The Night of Q) by Michael Reynolds (2006)

=== As author ===
- Express Yourself, It's Later Than You Think first published in The Atlantic Monthly

=== As contributing author ===
- The education of an Illustrator Published by Allsworth Press (2000)
- Design Issues: How Graphic Design Informs Society Published by Allsworth Press (2001)
- Career Opportunities In The Visual Arts -foreword by- Published by Facts on File (2006)

== Awards and honors ==
- Hamilton King Award, Society of Illustrators (1991)
- Illustrator Hall of Fame, Society of Illustrators (2005)
- In the permanent collection of the Society of Illustrators.
- To date, 25 Gold Medals, Society of Illustrators
