= Nigel Holmes =

British/American graphic designer, author, and theorist (born 1942)

- Born: Nigel Holmes; 15 June 1942 (age 84); Swanland, England
- Education: Royal College of Art
- Occupations: Graphic designer, illustrator, and author
- Known for: Information graphics

Nigel Holmes (born 15 June 1942, Swanland, England) is a British/American graphic designer, author, and theorist, who focuses on information graphics and information design.

== Biography ==
Graduating from Royal College of Art in London in 1966, Holmes ran his own successful graphic design practice in England. From 1966 to 1977 he worked as a freelance illustrator and graphic designer for clients such as British Broadcasting Corporation, Ford Motor Company, and Island Records. His work appeared in New Scientist, Radio Times, The Observer, Daily Telegraph, and The Times.

In 1977, art director Walter Bernard hired him to work in the map and chart department of Time magazine, where Holmes later became graphics director.

After a sabbatical he started his own company, which has explained things to and for a wide variety of clients, including Apple, Fortune, Nike, The Smithsonian Institution, Sony, United Healthcare, US Airways, and Visa.

In 2011 Stevenson University held a retrospective show of his work titled Picture This - The Explanation Design of Nigel Holmes.

In 2016 an exhibition of his work from 1960 to 2015 was shown at the QVIG Conference in Munich, Germany, and also at the VisCom Gallery, Schoonover Center, Ohio University

In 2026, Holmes's illustrations will feature in What We Ask Google, published by Random House and written by Simon Rogers.

== Publications ==
Partial list.

=== Books authored by Nigel Holmes ===
- Designer's Guide to Creating Charts and Diagrams (1984 Watson-Guptill) ISBN 0-8230-1315-4
- Designing Pictorial Symbols (1985 Watson-Guptill with Rose DeNeve) ISBN 0-8230-1327-8
- Pictorial Maps (1991 Watson-Guptill) ISBN 0-8230-4013-5
- Best in Diagrammatic Graphics (1993 Rotovision) ISBN 0-8230-6305-4
- Wordless Diagrams (2005 Bloomsbury) ISBN 1-5823-4522-8
- Pinhole and the Expedition to the Jungle (2010 Jorge Pinto Books) ISBN 978-1-9349-7830-6
- The Book of Everything: A Visual Guide to Travel and the World (2012 Lonely Planet) ISBN 978-1-74220-963-0
- Instant Expert: A Visual Guide to the Skills You've Always Wanted (2014 Lonely Planet) ISBN 978-1-74321-999-7
- Crazy Competitions (2018 Taschen edited by Julius Wiedemann) ISBN 978-3-8365-3908-1
- The Bigger Book of Everything: A Visual Guide to Travel and the World (2020 Lonely Planet) ISBN 978-1-83869-041-0
- Joyful Infographics: A Friendly, Human Approach to Data (2022 CRC Press) ISBN 978-1-03211-558-0
- Let’s Get Infografit: A Graphic Look at Exercise and Health (2025 CRC Press) ISBN 978-1-03277-727-6

=== Books with graphics by Nigel Holmes ===
- The Holy War, June 67 (1967 Cornmarket Press, edited by Christopher Angeloglou and Brian Haynes)
- English Landscapes (1973 BBC by W.G. Hoskins)
- The Making of the English (1973 BBC by Barry Cunliffe)
- Focus on Health (1973 Nelson Ann Burkitt)
- The Ascent of Man (1973 Little, Brown and Company, by Jacob Bronowski)
- Understanding USA (2000 TED Conference by Richard Saul Wurman)
- Information Anxiety 2 (2001 Que by Richard Saul Wurman)
- Diagnostic Tests for Men (2001 Top Books by Richard Saul Wurman)
- Understanding Children (2002 Top Books by Richard Saul Wurman)
- Understanding Healthcare (2004 Top Books by Richard Saul Wurman)
- The Enlightened Bracketologist: The Final Four of Everything (2007 Bloomsbury, by Mark Reiter, and Richard Sandomir)
- Blue Planet Run: The Race to Provide Safe Drinking Water to the World. (2007 Earth Aware Editions, by Rick Smolan, Jennifer Erwitt, and a foreword by Robert Redford)
- The Obama Time Capsule (2009 Against All Odds Productions, by Rick Smolan, Jennifer Erwitt, and Phoebe Smolan)
- Presimetrics: What the Facts Tell Us About How the Presidents Measure Up On the Issues We Care About (2010 Black Dog & Leventhal by Mike Kimel and Michael Kanell)
- Graphic: Inside the Sketchbooks of the World’s Great Graphic Designers (2010 The Monacelli Press by Steven Heller and Lita Talarico)
- Gerd Arntz: Graphic Designer (2010 010 Publishers edited by Ed Annink and Max Bruinsma)
- The Human Face of Big Data (2012 Against All Odds Productions, by Rick Smolan, and Jennifer Erwitt)
- Information Graphics (2012 Taschen, by Sandra Rendgen)
- Raw Data: Infographic Designers' Sketchbooks (2014 Thames & Hudson Ltd by Steven Heller and Rick Landers)
- Understanding the World. The Atlas of Infographics (2014 Taschen, by Sandra Rendgen)
- The Good Fight (2017 Against All Odds Productions, by Rick Smolan, and Jennifer Erwitt)

=== About Nigel Holmes ===
- On Information Design (2006 Jorge Pinto Books by Steven Heller)

== Lectures and teaching ==
Partial list

- 1980-2009 The Stanford Professional Publishing Course. Developed live action charts on stage, with students taking part.Video on YouTube
- 1984-1993 Rhode Island School of Design. An annual weeklong workshop for practicing information graphics designers, conducted with Dave Gray, Robert Lockwood, Ed Miller, George Rorick, John Monahon and guest lecturers.
- 1990 TED 2
- 1999 TED 9
- 2000 TED 10 Presentation: The Surplus and The Debt on YouTube
- 2009 TED (25th anniversary)
- 2011-2018 Yale Publishing Course (the successor to The Stanford Professional Publishing Course)
