= Commerce Inn =

Restaurant in New York City

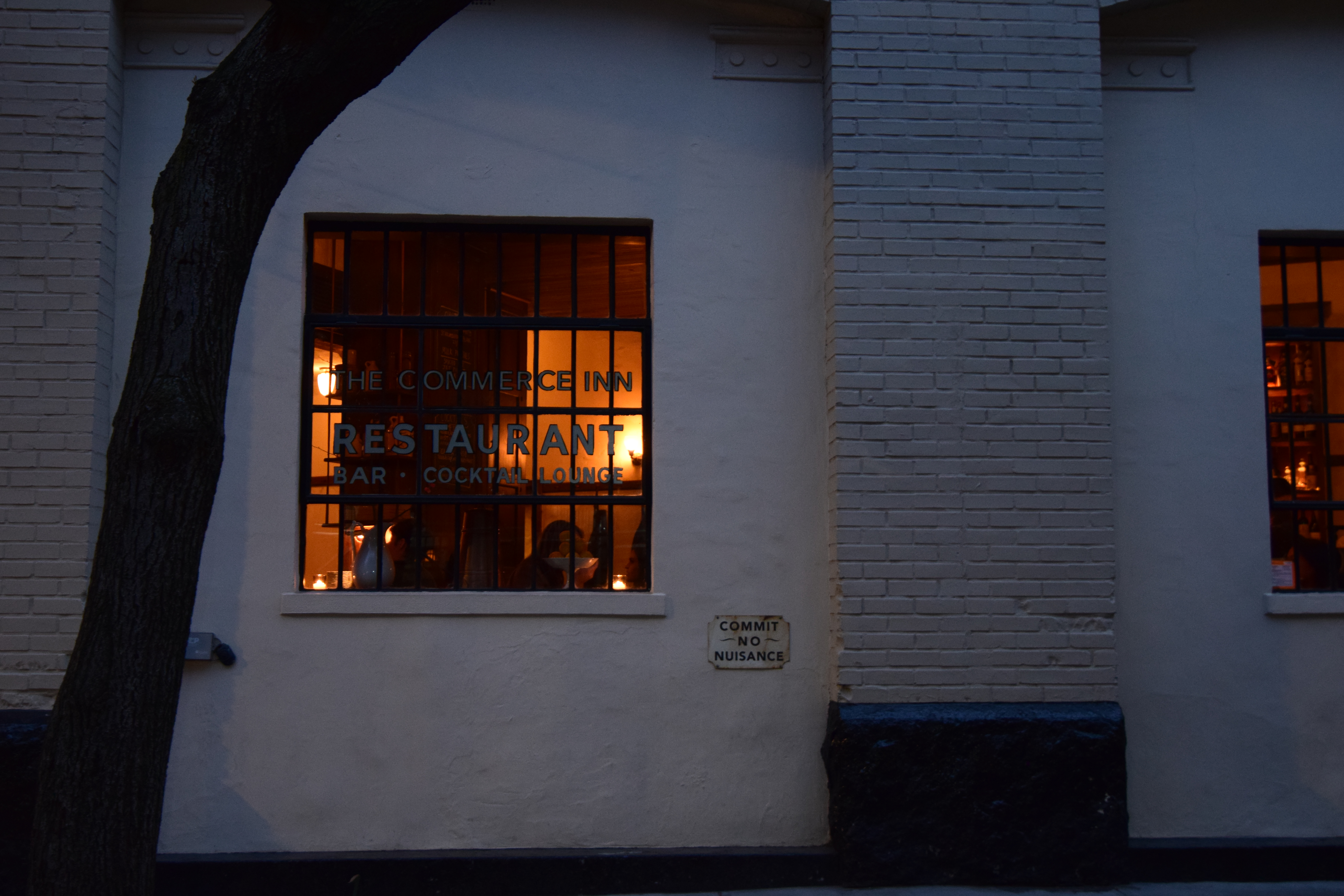
- Commerce Inn Front, 2023
- Interactive map of Commerce Inn

Restaurant information
- Established: 2021
- Owners: Jody Williams; Rita Sodi
- Location: 50 Commerce Street, New York City, New York, 10014, United States
- Coordinates: 40°43′53.2″N 74°0′20.4″W

Commerce Inn (also referred to as The Commerce Inn) is a restaurant in the West Village neighborhood in New York City. Commerce Inn was founded in late 2021 by restaurateurs Jody Williams and Rita Sodi. The restaurant draws inspiration from the Shakers, a Christian sect known for Shaker furniture.

== History ==
The space Commerce Inn occupies was built as a carriage house, and dates to 1911. A speakeasy formerly occupied the space. Later, it housed restaurants Blue Mill Tavern, then Grange Hall (which later rebranded as "Blue Mill"), then Commerce, and finally Fifty, which closed in 2018.

The restaurant was founded by restaurateurs and married couple Jody Williams and Rita Sodi, their third collaborative project after Via Carota and Bar Pisellino, and fifth overall. Williams and Sodi considered opening a restaurant like Commerce Inn for ten years. They drew inspiration from cookbooks collected by Williams' family, as well as a mutual interest in Shaker aesthetics, furniture, and values. Williams has said that the restaurant aims to "honor" what the Shakers "were doing".

The lease for the restaurant's space was signed in 2019. The opening of the restaurant was delayed by the COVID-19 pandemic. Williams and Sodi focused on takeout and retail sales as a means of keeping their other businesses afloat. Commerce Inn opened in December 2021.

=== Shaker influence ===
The restaurant draws inspiration from the Shakers. It includes furniture inspired by Shaker furniture and food inspired by Shaker recipes and Williams' and Sodi's interpretation of Shaker ideals. Only one Shaker community still exists, at Sabbathday Lake Shaker Village, where the two remaining Shakers, Brother Arnold Hadd and Sister June Carpenter, both reside. In an interview, Hadd has said that he does not consider there to be an identifiable set of "Shaker food" but acknowledged that cookbooks by Shakers have been written, such as the 1985 cookbook Shaker Your Plate. Hadd and Carpenter were not consulted about the restaurant, and Hadd has speculated that: "somebody found a cookbook [...] and thought, 'Well, you know, I can wiggle around with this pretty well.'"

Another restaurant inspired by Shaker cookbooks and cuisine, Stissing House, opened in 2022 in Pine Plains, a town in the Hudson Valley. The restaurant, founded by Clare de Boer, replaced a French restaurant, also called Stissing House. When asked about the perceived trend of Shaker restaurants and interest in Shaker culture demonstrated by the opening of the two restaurants, Hadd said that interest "ebbs and flows" but speculated that the focus on simple foods may be due, according to his perception, to "people [having] gone as haute cuisine as they possibly can".

== Reviews and accolades ==
The restaurant received a mixed review from the food critic for The New York Times, Pete Wells, in 2022. Wells contrasted the ambiance of the restaurant unfavorably with those cultivated at other restaurants owned by Williams and Sodi, writing that the restaurant does not "[invite] you to linger for hours." Wells further noted that candles might have helped soften the "Protestant severity" of the interior, but did refer to the furniture as "more comfortable than its penitential appearance suggests".

Wells' review of the food was also mixed, with praise focused on the meat, positively emphasizing generous portion sizes. Wells wrote unfavorably about the items on the "regular" menu, as opposed to dishes offered as specials. Wells in particular criticized the quality of the rarebit and the cod cakes, referring to them respectively as "melted and congealed Cheddar on toast" and as not "[holding] a lot of cod". Grub Street restaurant critic Adam Platt also criticized the rarebit and cod cakes, though on different grounds. Platt wrote that the cheese on the rarebit "wasn't quite melted" and that the cod cakes were "listless" and that they "lacked any trace of...just-cooked crunch." Wells and Platt both anticipated that the arrival of spring—both reviews were written in winter—might meaningfully change the quality of the food at Commerce Inn, given the impact the season has on ease of access to fresh produce.

In November 2023, Wells included Commerce Inn on a list of taverns in New York City where one could "have a drink and a bite while you escape the weather and anything else that’s giving you the chills".

Other critics have praised the roast chicken.
