= Justin Davidson =

American classical music and architecture critic (born 1966)

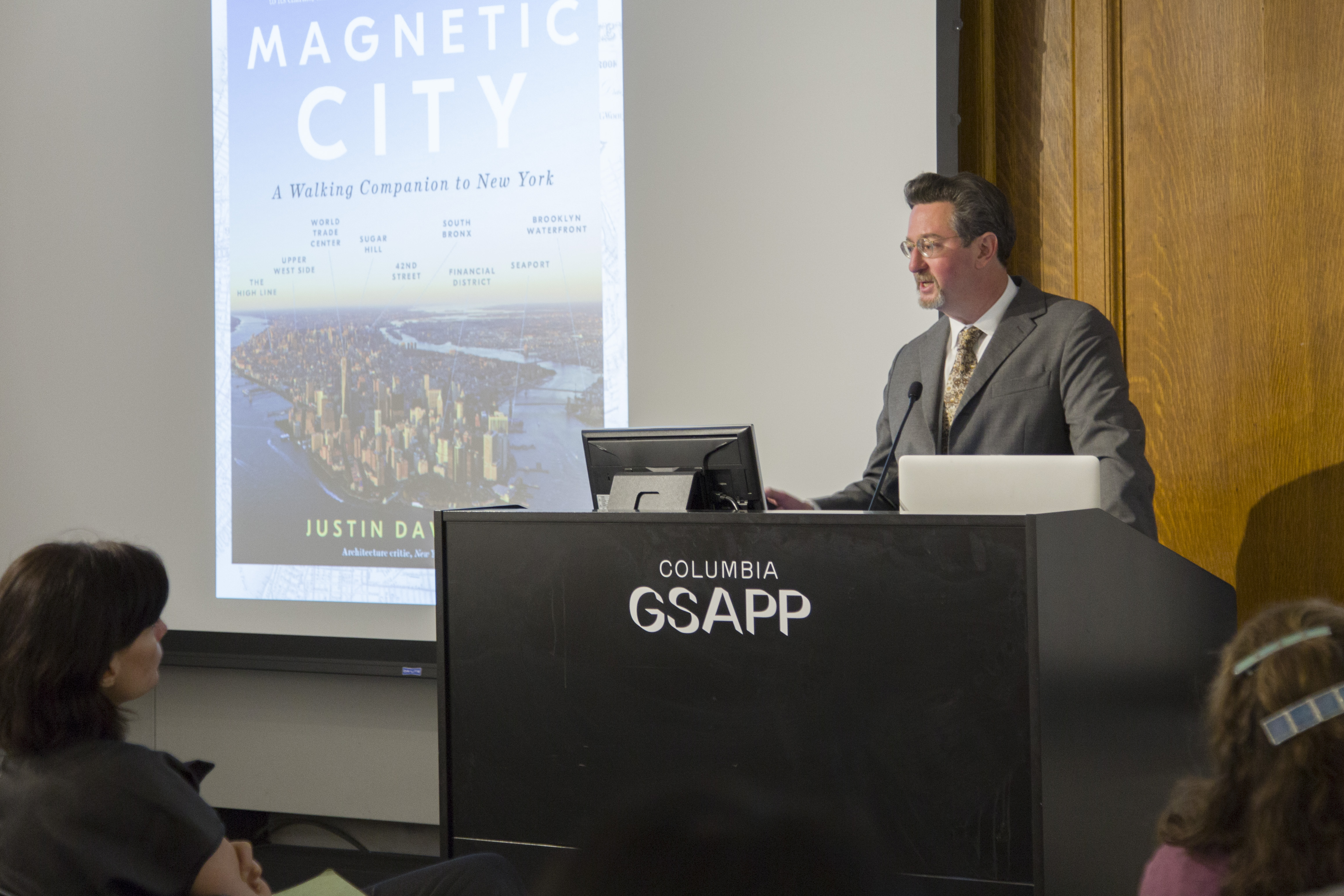
- Davidson introduces his book Magnetic City (2015) at Columbia GSAPP
- Born: May 16, 1966 (age 60); Rome, Italy
- Education: Harvard University; Columbia University
- Occupations: Music critic; architecture critic
- Notable credits: New York; Newsday

Justin Davidson (born May 16, 1966) is an American classical music and architecture critic of Italian birth. He has been the New York magazine's critic in both disciplines since 2007.

He won the 2002 Pulitzer Prize for Criticism for "his crisp coverage of classical music that captures its essence."

== Life and career ==
External videos
- Ted Talk by Justin Davidson
- Why glass towers are bad for city life -- and what we need instead

Justin Davidson was born in Rome, Italy on May 16, 1966. In 1983, he graduated from the American Overseas School of Rome, where his mother was an English teacher. Davidson began his journalism career as a local stringer for the Associated Press in Rome, before moving to the United States to study music at Harvard University. He went on to earn a doctorate degree in music composition at Columbia University, where he also taught. Davidson became a staff writer for the Long Island newspaper Newsday in 1996, where he wrote on both classical music and architecture. In September 2007, he was hired by New York magazine, continuing as a dual classical music and architecture critic.

In 2002, he won the Pulitzer Prize for Criticism, for "his crisp coverage of classical music that captures its essence." He was a finalist the prize earlier in 1999, and later in 2020. Fellow music critic Jayson Greene stated that "Davidson situates classical music in the same cultural conversation as other art forms, and his dynamic prose is rich with vivid allusions to, for example, photography and painting." As of 2021, Davidson and Alex Ross at The New Yorker are the only classical music critics who write regularly for a general-interest American magazine.

Davidson was among the faculty of D-Crit, and has taught courses at the Columbia Graduate School of Architecture, Planning and Preservation.

He is married to Ariella Budick, a New York–based art critic for the Financial Times.

== Selected writings ==
- Davidson, Justin (2014). "Intense Encounters With Imagination". In Pearlman, Chee (ed.). What If ...?: The Architecture and Design of David Rockwell. New York: Metropolis Books. ISBN 978-1-938922-56-5.
- —— (2015). "Urban Life: World Urbanization and Turbulent Change. Mexico City, Mexico". In World Monuments Fund (ed.). World Monuments: 50 Irreplaceable Sites to Discover, Explore and Champion. New York: Rizzoli. ISBN 978-0-8478-4681-8.
- —— (2017). "Box of contradictions". What is a Museum Now?: Snøhetta and the San Francisco Museum of Modern Art. Zürich: Lars Müller Publishers. ISBN 978-3-03778-507-2.
- —— (2017). Magnetic City A Walking Companion to New York. New York: Spiegel & Grau. ISBN 978-0-553-39470-2.
- —— (2024). "The Long View: Building for Rebuilding". In Diamonstein-Spielvogel, Barbaralee (ed.). Beyond Architecture: The New New York. New York: New York Review Books. pp. 79–90. ISBN 978-1-938922-56-5.
