= Simon Rogers (journalist) =

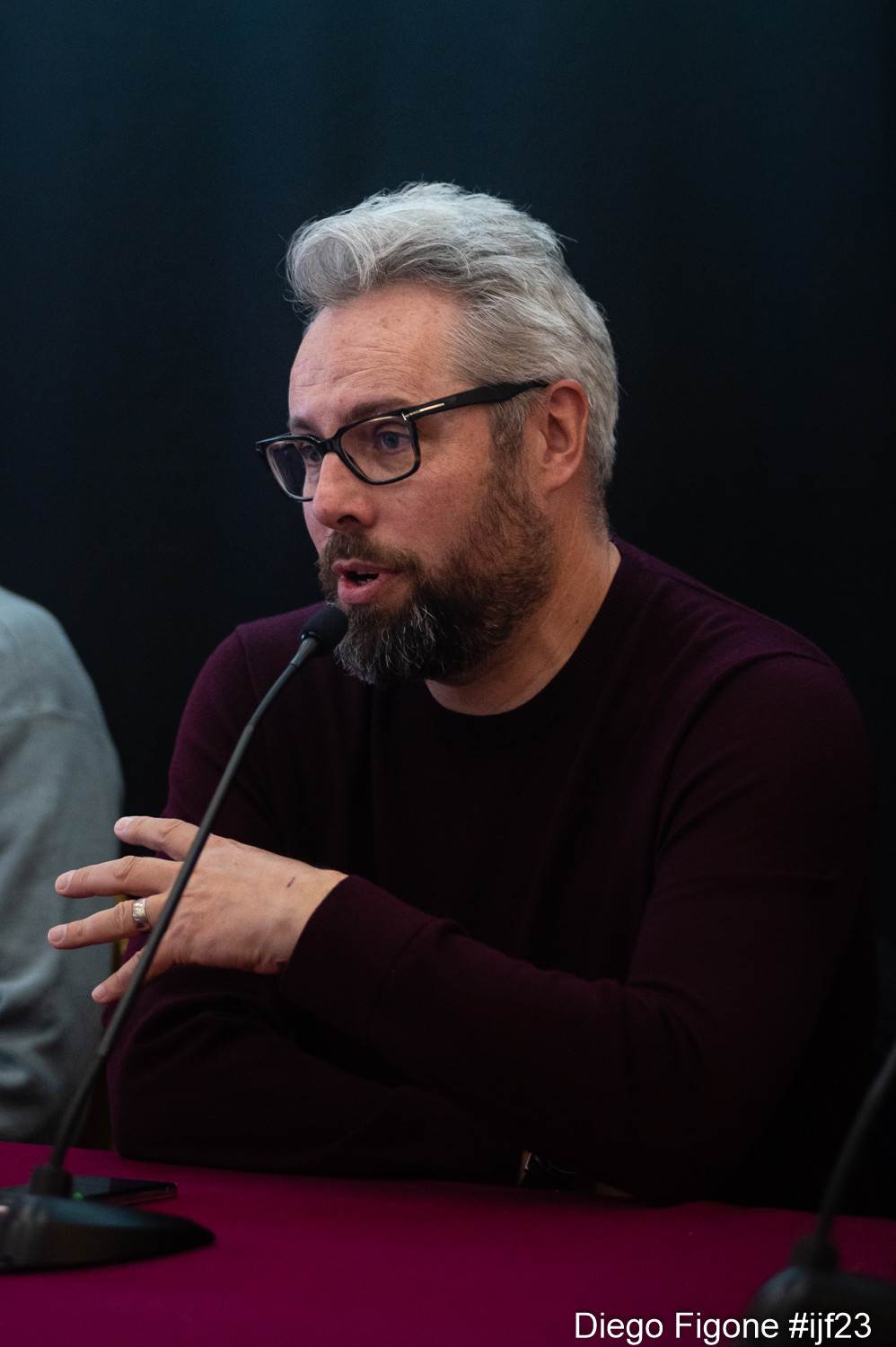
Simon Rogers speaking at the International Journalism Festival in Perugia, 2023

Simon Rogers is an English data journalist, data journalism advocate and author. He pioneered the use of a data blog for The Guardian in the early 2000s, and has been involved in data journalism since the mid-2000s.

== Career ==
Rogers was heavily involved in the launch of Guardian Unlimited, as editor of its news arm News Unlimited in 1999. He had previously been features editor at The Big Issue, most famously interviewing future Prime Minister Tony Blair.

In the mid-2000s, Rogers was data editor at the Guardian, one of the first news organisations to use the term data journalism in its use of computing and data in storytelling. Previous iterations of using data in journalism have been referred to as computer-assisted reporting, precision journalism, power reporting and database reporting. Rogers is responsible for the first recorded use of data journalism by a major news organization. It is widely used since Wikileaks' Afghan War documents leak in July, 2010, where Rogers was heavily involved through mapping and analysis.

His work with the Guardian's The Datastore and the Datablog was honoured at the Knight Batten awards for innovation in journalism, 2011. In 2010, the Royal Statistical Society, a nonprofit based in England and Wales, awarded Rogers a special commendation for Statistical Excellence in Journalism, citing the Datablog. In 2012, Rogers predicted the future of data journalism: "Anyone can do it. Data journalism is the new punk." In 2013, Rogers published Facts are Sacred: the power of data (the Guardian published an extract of the book); he has also authored books on infographics for children.

After the Guardian, in 2013, Simon moved to Twitter, as its first data editor, before moving again, to Google in San Francisco where he works as the data editor.

At Google, he has been a part of the 'Visualizing Data with Google' project, which received 'Information is Beautiful' Awards in 2017 and 2022. Rogers' work has been featured by Information is Beautiful multiple times. He is one of the instructors of an online course in data journalism made available by the Knight Center for Journalism in the Americas. In 2017, Rogers spoke at the 12th Congress of Investigative Journalism about the importance of journalists learning to code.

In 2019, Rogers predicted that data journalism was becoming a global field; he was one of a selected group of journalists asked by the Nieman Lab out of Harvard University to make predictions for journalism for 2019. Rogers' work was also cited in a Columbia Journalism Report about the ethics of AI and journalism. In 2020, Rogers helped launch the Sigma Awards, a new data journalism competition. After the COVID-19 pandemic began in 2020, Rogers tracked trends in Google related to the pandemic.

Rogers is one of the contributing authors to the Data Journalism Handbook and teaches data journalism at Medill-Northwestern University in San Francisco and has taught at UC Berkeley Graduate School of Journalism.

In 2021, Rogers set up a 'Data Journalism Podcast', with co-host Alberto Cairo. He is a regular speaker at the International Journalism Festival in Perugia.

Rogers' next book, What We Ask Google, was published by Torva, a Penguin Random House Imprint, in 2026 in the UK and Dutton in the US, with illustrations by Nigel Holmes. In May 2026 it was named one of the Best New Popular Science books by New Scientist.
