= Via Carota =

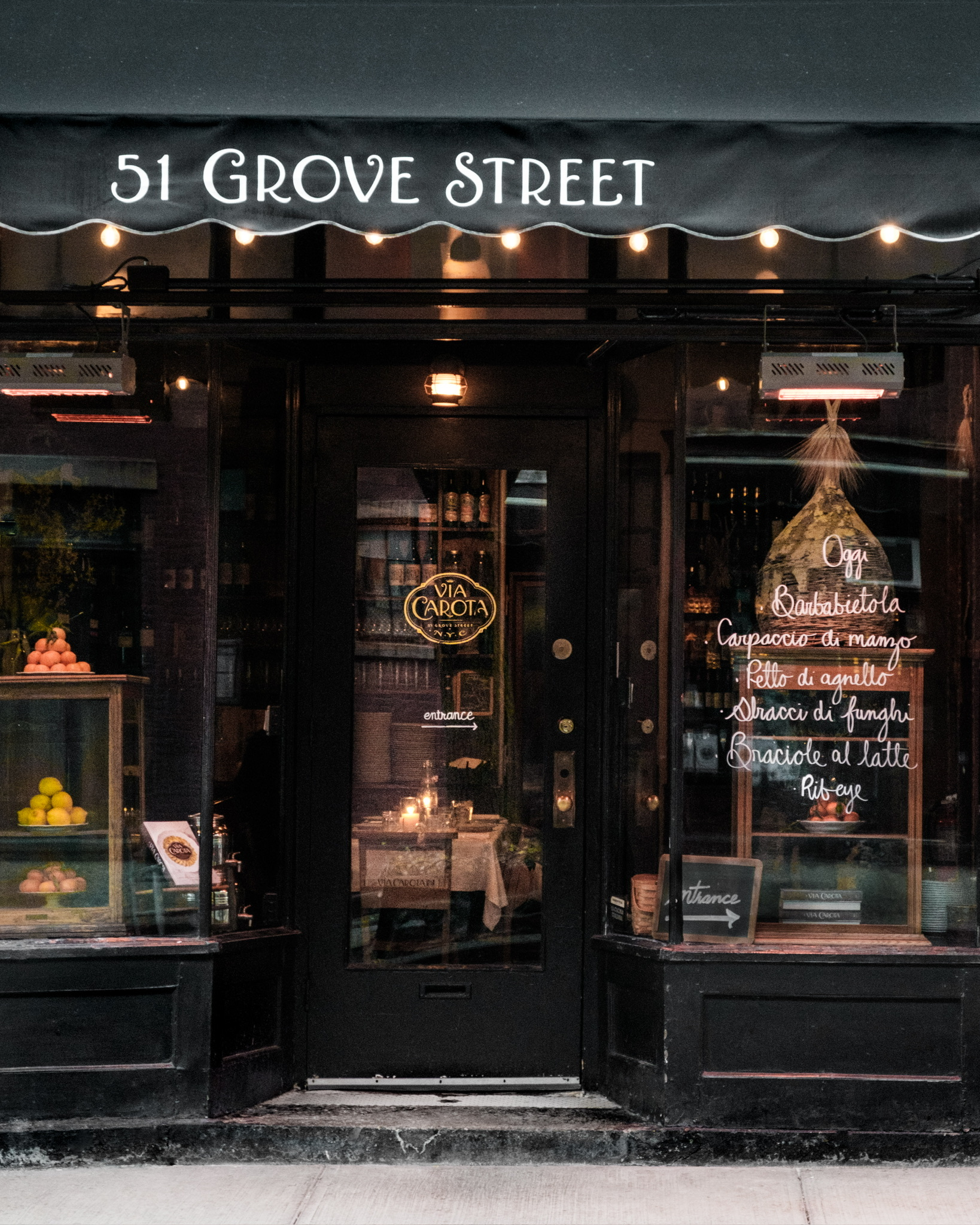
- Via Carota Facade
- Interactive map of Via Carota

Restaurant information
- Established: 2014
- Owners: Jody Williams; Rita Sodi
- Rating: The New York Times: 2 out of 4 stars
- Location: New York City, New York, 10014, United States
- Coordinates: 40°43′59.4″N 74°0′13.2″W

Via Carota is an Italian restaurant in the West Village neighborhood in New York City. Via Carota was founded by married restaurateurs Jody Williams and Rita Sodi.

== History ==
The owners of Via Carota, Jody Williams and Rita Sodi, had previously respectively founded the restaurants Buvette and I Sodi. Via Carota was the first restaurant the pair founded together; they have since opened the restaurant Commerce Inn and the bar Bar Pisellino. Before Via Carota opened, Williams and Sodi hosted a party in the restaurant for employees of Buvette and I Sodi to ensure the space was functional. Via Carota opened in November 2014. Via Carota is located in the West Village, near I Sodi, Buvette, and Bar Pisellino. Sodi and Williams named the restaurant after a street in an Italian town where Sodi previously lived.

Via Carota expanded in 2016, leasing a space next to the existing restaurant. Sodi and Williams began selling Via Carota-branded pre-bottled cocktails in 2023.

== Reception and accolades ==
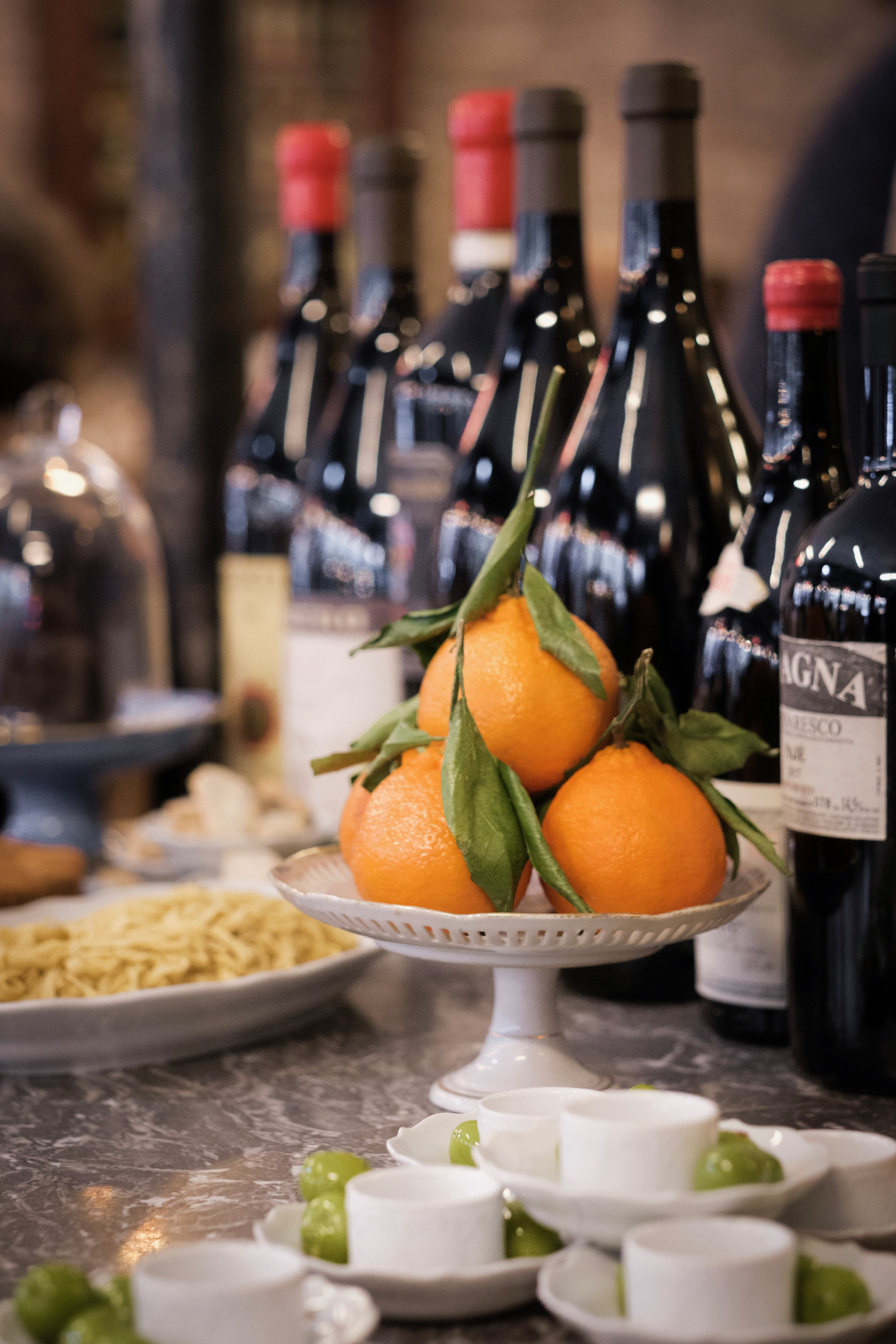
Via Carota

The restaurant has received positive reviews from critics, including Pete Wells of The New York Times. Wells compared the restaurant favorably to Buvette and I Sodi, praising Via Carota for avoiding Buvette's "preciousness" while retaining the dedication to high-quality pasta found at I Sodi. Wells awarded the restaurant two stars.

Robert Sietsema, writing for Eater, also gave the restaurant a positive review.

The restaurant has remained popular since it opened, resulting frequently in long wait times to be seated and difficulty securing reservations. Hannah Goldfield, writing for The New Yorker, referred to the restaurant as "a restaurant person’s restaurant". Instagram account DeuxMoi, which focuses on celebrity gossip and sightings, frequently posts about famous clientele at Via Carota and nearby restaurant Carbone. Samin Nosrat has said the restaurant is her favorite in New York City.

=== Accolades ===
In 2019, for their work at Via Carota, Williams and Sodi were both given the award for "Best Chef" in New York City at the annual James Beard Foundation Awards. Writing for Bloomberg, Tejal Rao included the restaurant on her list of the "Best New Restaurants of 2015".

Pete Wells placed Via Carota in fourth place in his 2023 ranking of the hundred best restaurants in New York City, and in fifth place on the same list for 2024.
