= SVA MFA Design Criticism =

Unit of the School of Visual Arts, New York City

SVA MFA Design Criticism (D-Crit)
- Established: 2008
- Location: New York, NY
- Website: dcrit.sva.edu

D-Crit is the Design Criticism MFA department at the School of Visual Arts in New York City, chaired by Alice Twemlow and co-founded along with Steven Heller in 2006. In Fall 2008, the department enrolled 15 students, who became the inaugural class to complete the two-year program and graduate, in May 2010, with a Design Criticism Master of Fine Arts degree. In the fall of 2014, the program morphed into a one-year Master of Arts degree in Design Research, Writing, and Criticism.

== Program Chair ==
- Alice Twemlow

== Program Co-Founders ==
- Alice Twemlow
- Steven Heller

== Faculty ==
- Alice Twemlow
- Steven Heller
- Kurt Andersen
- Paola Antonelli
- Akiko Busch
- Ralph Caplan
- Andrea Codrington
- Justin Davidson
- Russell Flinchum
- Janet Froelich
- Karrie Jacobs
- Alexandra Lange
- Julie Lasky
- Adam Harrison Levy
- Elaine Louie
- Matilda McQuaid
- Leital Molad
- Phil Patton
- Shax Riegler
- Elizabeth Spiers
- Karen Stein
