= Nicolas Heller =

American filmmaker and social media personality

- Born: c. 1989 (age 36–37)
- Education: Emerson College
- Parent(s): Steven Heller and Louise Fili

Nicolas "Nico" Heller (born c. 1989), better known as "New York Nico", is an American documentary film director, and social media personality known for his Instagram account @newyorknico. Nicknamed the "Unofficial Talent Scout of New York", Heller uses his platform to share photos, videos and stories showcasing life in New York City. In 2025, his commercial for Katz's Delicatessen won a New York Emmy Award.

== Early life and career ==
Nico is the son of art director Steven Heller and graphic designer Louise Fili. He grew up in New York City and attended the Little Red School House and Elisabeth Irwin High School. He obtained a degree in film from Emerson College and has gone on to create music videos, commercials, documentaries, and more under his production company, Heller Films. He first garnered attention for finding and recording offbeat New Yorkers.

Heller Films' ordinary operation was put on pause during the COVID-19 pandemic, and subsequent lockdown in New York City. During this time, Heller held a contest for Best New York Accent. New Yorkers in quarantine sent him video clips of their accents. The resulting videos went viral, and the project was picked up by mainstream media including The New York Times and CNN.

Heller used the New York-themed contest platform to raise hundreds of thousands of dollars for charity. Small businesses are highlighted regularly on his social media channel to bring awareness to their fight to stay in business during the economic challenges of COVID-19, including Astor Place Hairstylists, Ray's Candy Store, Army & Navy Bags, Veselka and more.

In 2024 Heller released New York Nico's Guide to NYC (HarperCollins, ISBN 978-0-0633198-0-6), an illustrated guidebook to New York City.

== Personal life ==
Heller lives in Brooklyn. In 2025 he married a graphic designer, Naomi Otsu, with a wedding reception at Katz's Delicatessen, covered by The New York Times Styles desk.

== MTA collaborations ==
In November 2020, Heller announced a venture with MTA to enlist celebrities and notable New Yorkers to record public messages for use in the New York City subway. As of Spring 2020, messages have been recorded by:

- Cam'ron
- Fran Lebowitz
- Whoopi Goldberg
- Young M.A.
- Jerry Seinfeld
- Edie Falco
- Bowen Yang
- Awkwafina
- Angie Martinez
- Bob the Drag Queen
- Debi Mazar
- Michael Rapaport
- Jadakiss
- DesusNice
- The Kid Mero
- MaliibuMitch
- Dave East
- FivioForeign
- Pat Kiernan
- Angela Yee
- Peter Rosenberg
- Ilana Glazer
- Michael Kay
- Eric Andre
- Abbi Jacobson

In December 2024, Instagram and MTA collaborated and had Metrocards sold featuring New York Nico.

== Recent work ==
=== Katz's Delicatessen commercial (2024) ===
In November 2024, Heller directed, co-wrote, and self-financed "Twins," the first-ever commercial in the 136-year history of Katz's Delicatessen. The 80-second spot, made with creative agency m ss ng p eces, stars Dave Roffe of the Instagram account Old Jewish Men as a pair of twin brothers and promotes Katz's nationwide shipping service. Heller produced the commercial in exchange for the right to hold his wedding reception at the deli. The spot won a New York Emmy Award for Commercial (Single Spot) at the 68th Annual New York Emmy Awards in October 2025.

=== 26.2 (2025) ===
In October 2025, Heller premiered 26.2: Journey to the Finish Line of the NYC Marathon, a 35-minute documentary short following four runners in New York Road Runners' Team Inspire as they trained for the 2024 New York City Marathon. The four featured subjects — Joel Kaufman, Johnny Pye, Ladawn Jefferson, and Shaquille Roberts — included a stroke survivor, a cancer survivor, a house-fire survivor, and the 2023 marathon's official final finisher. The film was co-produced by Heller Films, m ss ng p eces, and New York Road Runners' East 89th Street Productions, premiered at AMC Lincoln Square 13 in Manhattan, and was distributed by Tribeca Films via YouTube.

=== Revival of the Fittest ===
In December 2025, Heller launched Revival of the Fittest, an Instagram-based series filmed at Village Revival Records, a record store in Greenwich Village, Manhattan. The show centers on a recurring cast of regulars who gather there, with each two-minute episode capturing off-the-cuff conversations about music, culture, and daily life.

== See also ==
- Green Lady of Brooklyn
