= ClearRx =

Prescription bottle design

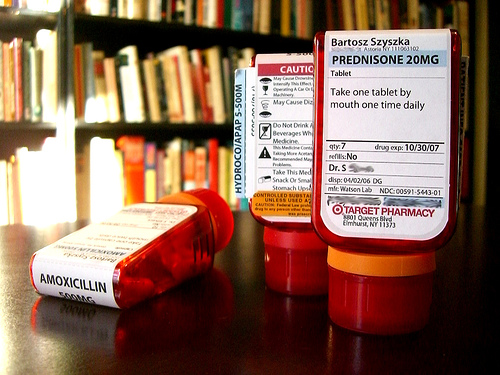
Target ClearRx prescription bottles

ClearRx is a trademark for a design for prescription drug packaging, designed by design student Deborah Adler as a thesis project and adopted by Target Corporation (with refinements by industrial designer Klaus Rosburg) for use in their in-store pharmacies in 2005. The design is an attempt to clarify certain challenging aspects common to most prescription bottles used in the US.

== Background ==
The ClearRx bottle design was created to replace the classic orange pill bottle, which had existed since just after World War II. Patients often did not read the information on the orange bottle label, as the text was tiny, and the company logo was usually the most emphasized text on the bottle. Warnings and cautions were also printed in inadequate color combinations, making them hard to read.

== Design ==
Bottles have a distinctive rounded-wedge shape and are designed to stand on their caps, with the label folding over the top of the bottle, where the name of the drug is printed in large print for easy identification. A cutout on the back of the bottle includes space for a data card describing the effects and risks of the medication. Fundamental to the design is a colored rubber ring that serves as a color code so different household members can distinguish their prescriptions. An overall priority is given to distinguishability; the most important information (patient name, drug name, instructions) is placed prominently on the upper half of the label. Other innovations include revised warning symbols and labels and a small magnifying strip that can be inserted into the side of the bottle for customers with visual impairments.

Liquid medicine bottles are not quite as distinctive, but they feature a spill-proof cap coupled with a dosing syringe that is claimed to be more accurate than spoon dispensing. The liquid medicine bottles also feature a color-coded ring around the neck.

The design won the "Design of the Decade" award from the Industrial Designers Society of America in 2010 and is included in the Museum of Modern Art's permanent collection.

After Target sold its in-store pharmacy and clinic operations to CVS Health in December 2015, CVS discontinued using ClearRx. A new Debora Adler-designed bottle trade-named AdlerRx rolled out to CVS pharmacies in 2021.

== Patents ==
- US patent 7311205, Deborah B. Adler, Klaus Rosburg, Patrick L. Douglas, Matthew S. Grisik, "Pharmacy Bottle System Including Label", issued 2007-12-25
- US patent D542661, Deborah B. Adler, Klaus Rosburg, Patrick Douglas, Matthew S. Grisik, "Bottle", issued 2007-5-15
