= Ray's Candy Store =

New York City deli established in 1974

Coordinates: 40°43′34.55″N 73°59′0.74″W

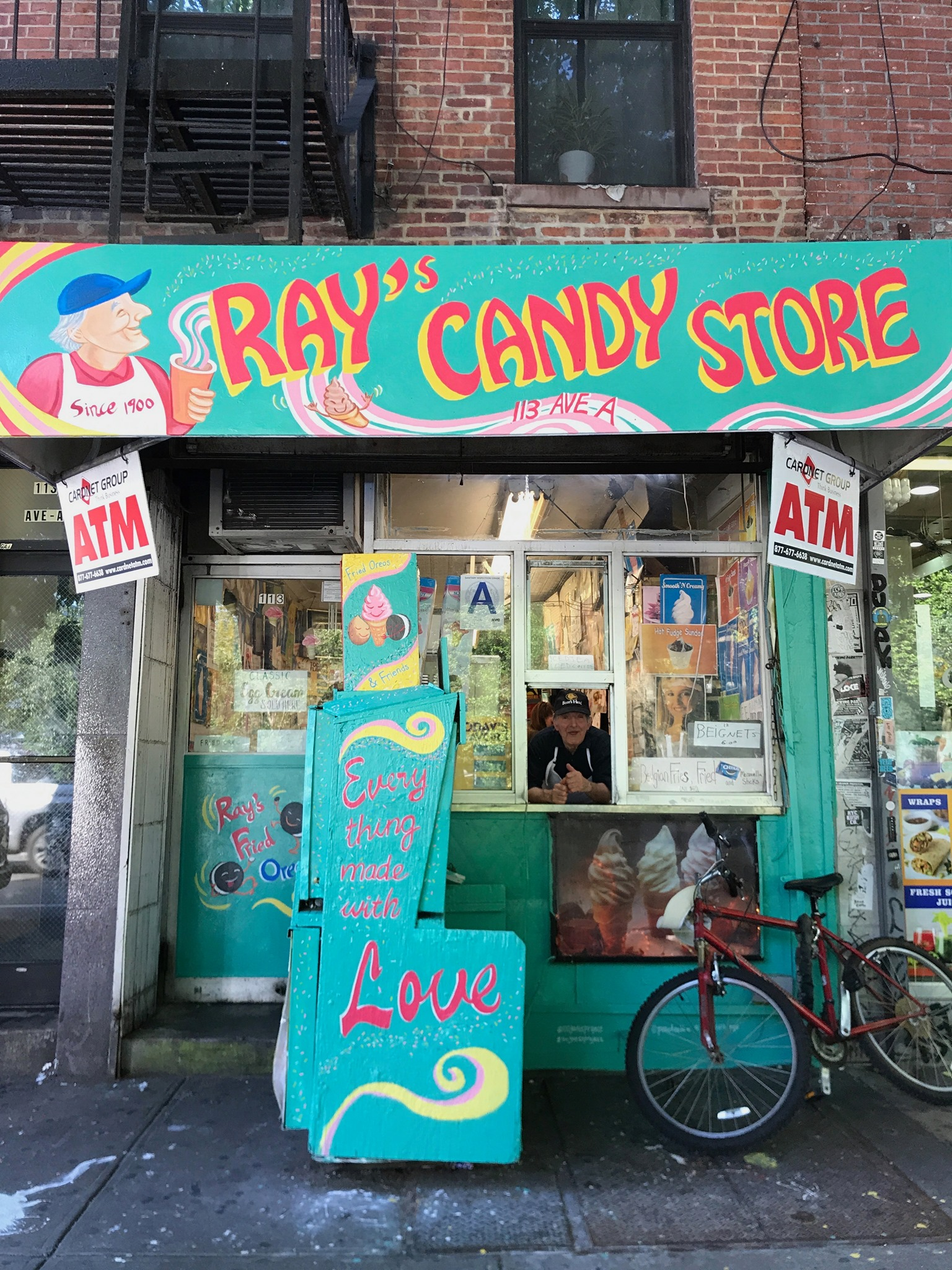
- Ray's Candy Store storefront, c. June 2019. Ray Alvarez can be seen in the window.
- Type: Private
- Industry: Deli, confectionary
- Founded: 1974
- Founder: Ray Alvarez (Asghar Ghahraman)
- Headquarters: 113 Avenue A, East Village, Manhattan
- Area served: New York City, New York, U.S.
- Website: rayscandystore.com

Ray's Candy Store is a deli at 113 Avenue A in the East Village neighborhood of Manhattan in New York City. The store has been in business since 1974.

Owned and operated by Ray Alvarez, it serves an eclectic mix of foods, including egg creams, soft serve ice cream, New Orleans-style beignets, Belgian fries, and coffee. The store has been featured in several American books, films, and television shows.

== History ==
Alvarez was born Asghar Ghahraman on January 1, 1933, in Tabriz, Iran. He served in the Iranian Navy. In 1963, while on tour of the East Coast of the United States, he deserted his ship and swam to shore off the coast of Virginia. After a few months in Miami, he moved to New York in 1964 where he worked for another decade as a dishwasher and waiter until he paid $30,000 to buy the store in 1974.

On the evening of August 6, 1988, what became known as the Tompkins Square Park Riot broke out between police and a group of protestors rallying against a recently enacted curfew on the park. Ray's Candy Store, across from the entrance to the park, remained open during the riot that ensued. Ray said he stayed open "because all the combatants were his customers."

On the morning of June 19, 1992, Curtis Sliwa, the founder and CEO of the vigilante group Guardian Angels, was kidnapped and shot by two gunmen after entering a stolen taxi outside Ray's Candy Store.

In early 2010, Ray's Candy Store fell behind on its rent and faced eviction by its landlord. The business was the subject of much press as a result. In a broad show of support, friends, neighbors, customers, and other community members quickly rushed to Ray's aid, hosting various fundraisers and starting a social media campaign meant to boost the beloved business's profile.

In July 2011, after many decades, Ray became a naturalized U.S. citizen at a ceremony held at 26 Federal Plaza in lower Manhattan. Due to fears as an illegal immigrant, he adopted the identity of a Puerto Rican named Ray Alvarez. In the 1980s, Ray received amnesty under President Ronald Reagan, however, his green card was mailed to the wrong address, and he continued to lack documentation. At age 78, Ray was finally able to qualify to become an American citizen.

New York photographer Robert "Bob" Arihood often staked out a spot in front of Ray's Candy store taking pictures of the comings and going around the store and often portrayed Ray and his store on his blog, Neither more nor less. After Arihood's death in October 2011, he was temporarily memorialized on the sign of Ray's Candy Store.

On January 31, 2023, at approximately 3:00 am, Ray was attacked outside his store just weeks after his 90th birthday. Luis Peroza and Gerald Barth were arrested for the assault and robbery spree in the East Village on February 4. Per the indictment by Manhattan district attorney Alvin Bragg, Peroza approached Ray and one of his employees and asked if Ray would purchase canned drinks from him, but Ray declined. Peroza then handed the drinks to Barth before he returned to Ray and struck him in the head with an unknown weapon, cutting his face and giving him a black eye, fracturing facial bones, and breaking his jaw. The attack received coverage by multiple local, national, and international news sources. An image of Ray with a black eye and bruised temple was featured on the cover of the February 3rd print edition of the New York Daily News. Nonetheless, Ray insisted on immediately returning to working the counter at his business without so much as taking a break after the attack.

== Ray's Annual Birthday Burlesque Extravaganza ==
Beginning in 2007, some friends and employees of Ray's have thrown him an annual birthday party at the store, typically featuring a lineup of local burlesque dancers. The invite-only surprise party is often chronicled by local media and is cheekily referred to by the store's staff as "THE BEST TRADITION IN NEW YORK CITY™."

== Appearances in media ==
=== Film ===
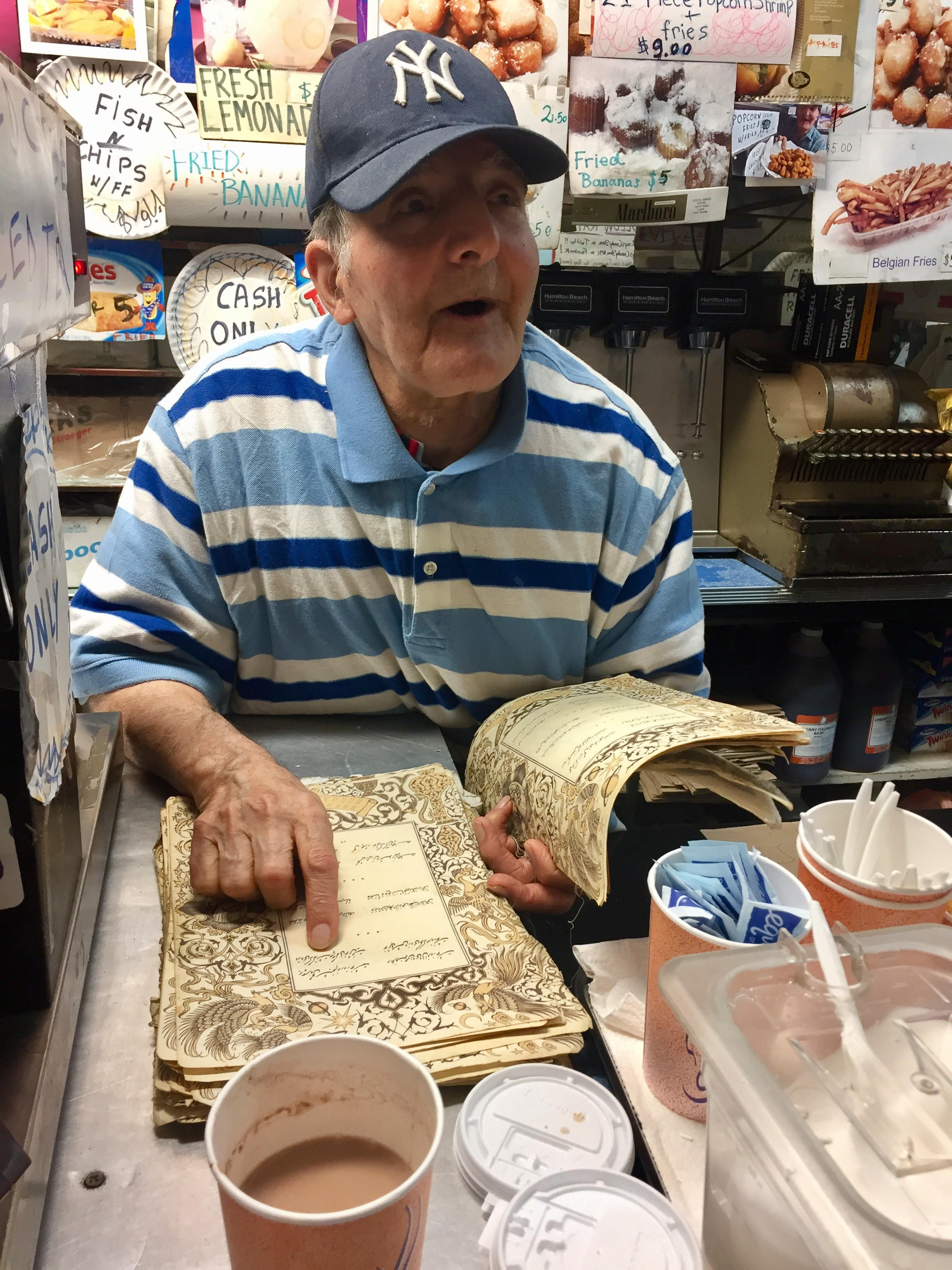
Owner Ray Alvarez, sitting behind the counter of the store

In the 1993 film drama What About Me, two actors approach the exterior to-go window of Ray's Candy Store and order milk shakes. The voice of proprietor Ray Alvarez can be heard taking their order through the window.

In the 1995 action film Die Hard with a Vengeance, the exterior of Ray's Candy Store was featured in a scene filmed in and around Tompkins Square Park.

=== Television ===
In July 2010, Ray was featured in a Fox News special hosted by John Stossel called "What's Great about America."

In November 2011, both an interior and exterior shot of Ray's Candy Store were featured in an episode of the HBO comedy-drama series How to Make It in America. The episode, titled "The Friction," was the seventh episode of the second season. In an interview, principal actor, Bryan Greenberg, who attended NYU as a student, made particular reference to the scene shot at Ray's as a "full circle moment for me." In the scene, actors Greenberg and Victor Rasuk meet up for some frites to discuss brand business, while at their backs a "Save Ray's Candy Store" poster is in clear sight. They eventually walk outside onto Avenue A where the exterior hodgepodge of store signage receives its own cameo.

In 2014, Ray and the interior of Ray's Candy Store appeared in an episode of the Vice Media documentary web series Fuck, That's Delicious starring rapper, and former chef, Action Bronson.

In November 2018, Ray's Candy Store was featured in the series finale of CNN's travel and food show, Anthony Bourdain: Parts Unknown. The episode, titled "Lower East Side" – which brought Bourdain's culinary travelogue full circle back to his hometown of New York – aired November 11, 2018. In the scene, Bourdain and friend, musician Harley Flanagan, stop into Ray's Candy Store to chat up the proprietor and sample his famous eggs creams. Said Bourdain upon his first sip, "That is a superb egg cream."

=== Books ===
In the 1997 book New York Eats (More): The Food Shopper's Guide to the Freshest Ingredients, the Best Take-Out & Baked Goods, & the Most Unusual Marketplaces in All of New York by Ed Levine, Ray's Candy Store is highlighted in a section on the egg cream.

In 2015, the business was featured in James and Karla Murray's book Store Front II: A History Preserved, a photographic chronicle of historical and storied businesses in New York City.

In 2018, Ray's Candy Store was mentioned in William B. Helmreich's The Manhattan Nobody Knows: An Urban Walking Guide.

In 2022, an illustration of the place was included in NYC Storefronts: Illustrations of the Big Apple's Best-Loved Spots by Joel Holland and David Dodge.

In 2023, Ray's Candy Store was featured in another of James and Karla Murray's books, Store Front NYC: Photographs of the City's Independent Shops, Past and Present.

In 2024, it was featured in Nicolas Heller's book, New York Nico's Guide to NYC.

In 2025, Ray's Candy Store was featured in Rolando Pujol's book, "The Great American Retro Road Trip."

Also in 2025, photographer Whitney Browne self-published her debut film photography book, "Candy Store," providing "a behind-the-counter peek at the public yet intimate workings of Ray’s Candy Store in the early hours, where people seek out fried treats and late-night company."

In 2026, Ray's Candy Store was featured in Daniel Root's photography book, "The East Village Then and Now," billed as "an exciting and essential record of downtown Manhattan—iconic street scenes captured from the same vantage point in the 1980s and today.

=== Music ===
The song "Lilly's Treat" by ska-punk band, Team Spider, off of their 2002 collaboration album with No Cash entitled "Summertime in the City" makes several references to Ray, Avenue A, and his famed egg creams.

In 2017, Ray and the interior and exterior of the store were featured in rock musician Jesse Malin's music video for "Meet Me at the End of the World."

In 2020, New York-based musician, Carly Shea, filmed a music video for "Waste My Time" at Ray's Candy Store and several other local businesses.

=== Web ===
In August 2021, a two-part interview with Ray was featured on author, photographer, and blogger Brandon Stanton's popular photoblog, Humans of New York.

== Awards ==
In August 2015, Ray's Candy Store was selected as the Greenwich Village Society for Historic Preservation's "Business of the Month."

In November 2016, Ray's Candy Store won "Best Restaurant" in the East Village in the inaugural Time Out New York Love New York Awards.

In 2020, Ray's Candy Store was awarded a "Village Award" by the Greenwich Village Society for Historic Preservation. The awards recognize those people, places, and organizations that make a significant contribution to the quality of life in Greenwich Village, the East Village, and NoHo."

== Gallery ==
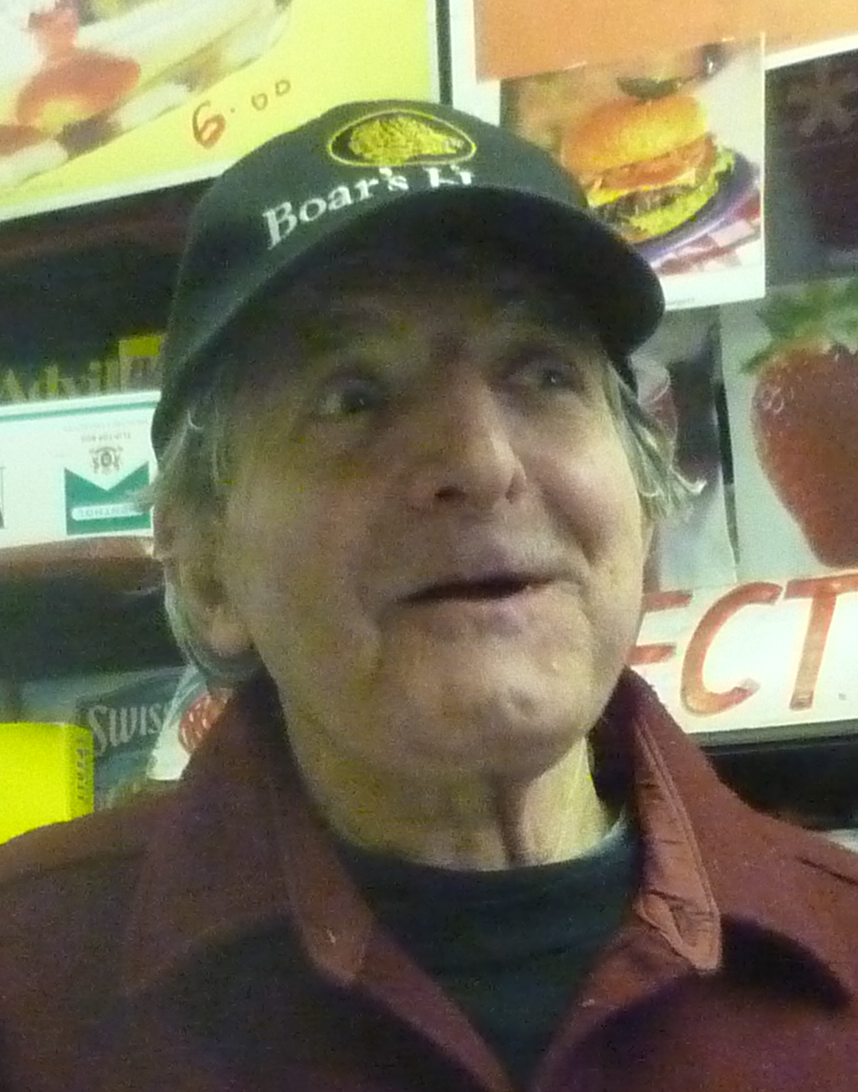
Ray Alvarez, the proprietor

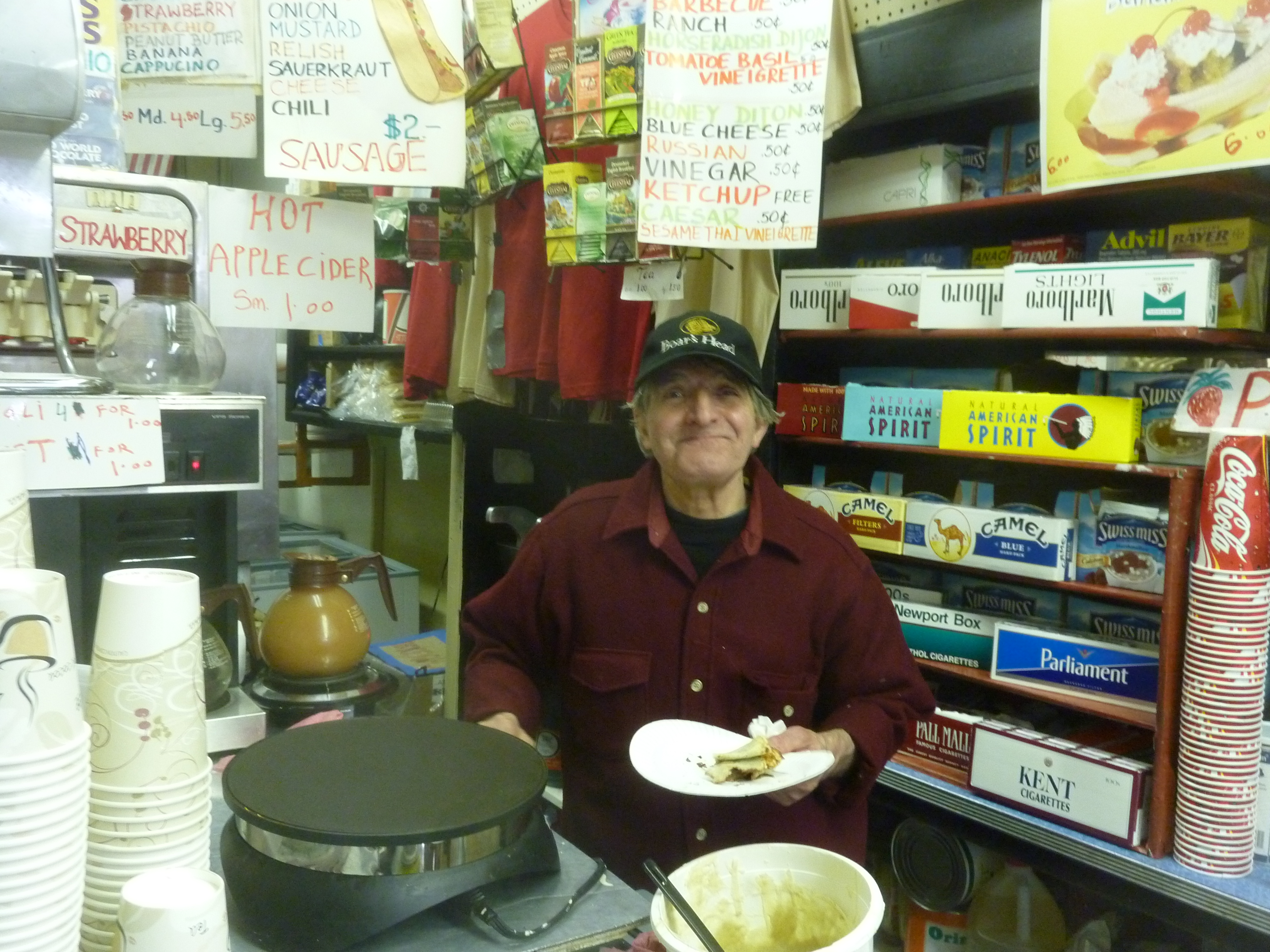
Alvarez showing off his new crêpe machine in 2011

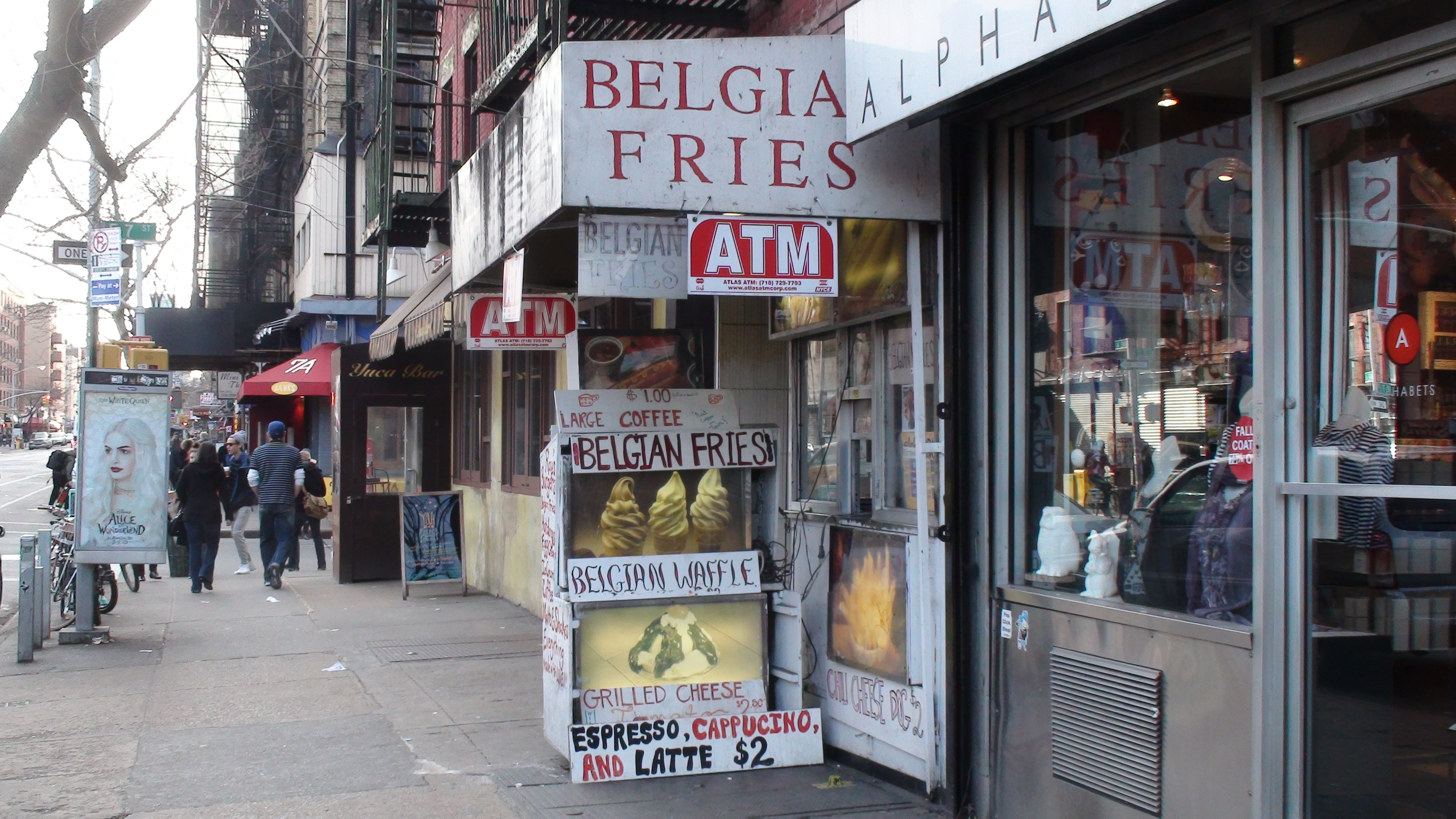
The exterior of Ray's Candy Store as it appeared in 2010
