= King (restaurant) =

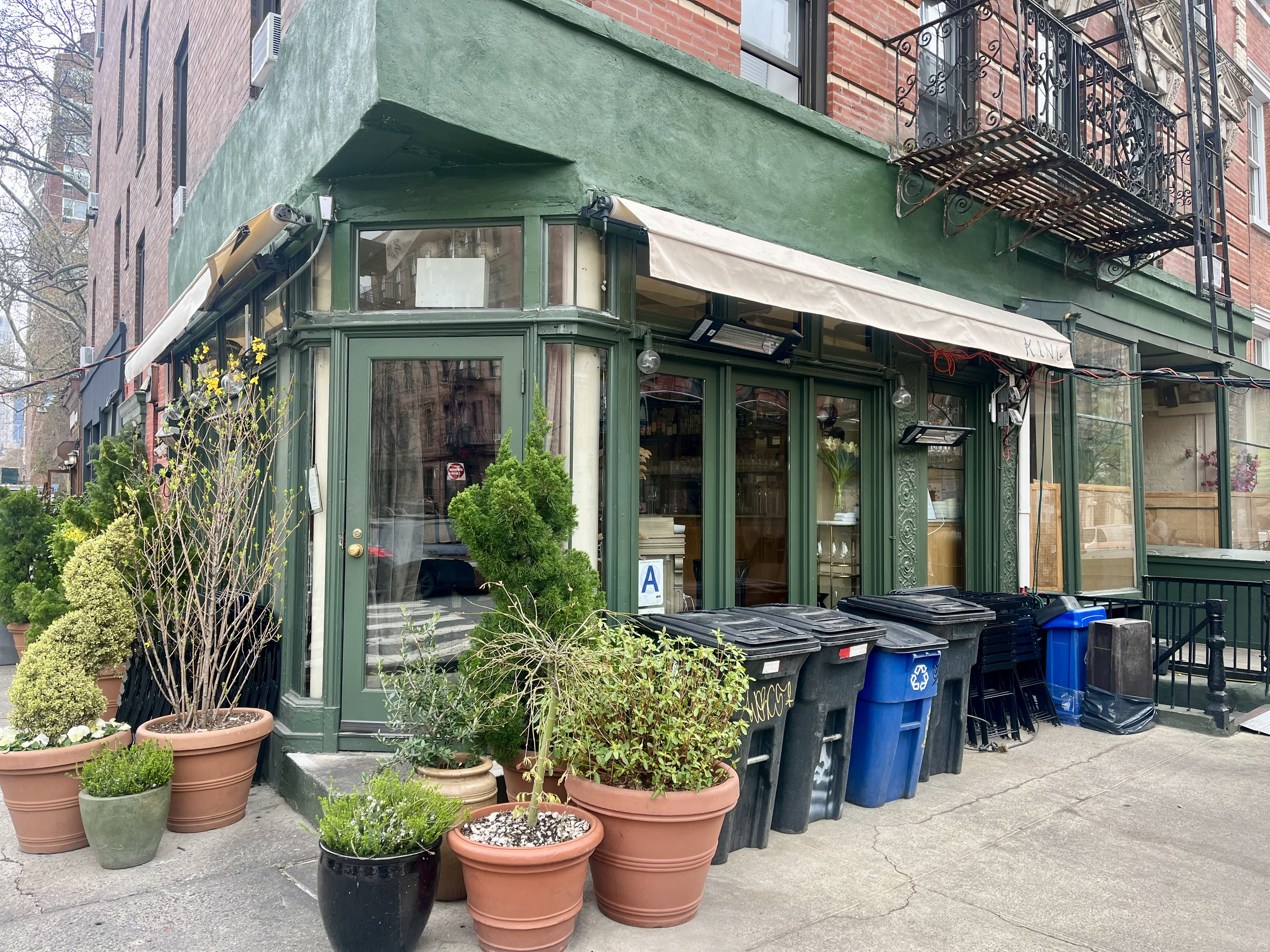
- King in April 2024
- Interactive map of King

Restaurant information
- Established: September 2016
- Location: 18 King Street, New York City, New York, United States
- Coordinates: 40°43′39″N 74°00′12″W

King is a restaurant in the South Village neighborhood of Manhattan, in New York City. King opened in September 2016. King serves French and Italian food.

== History ==
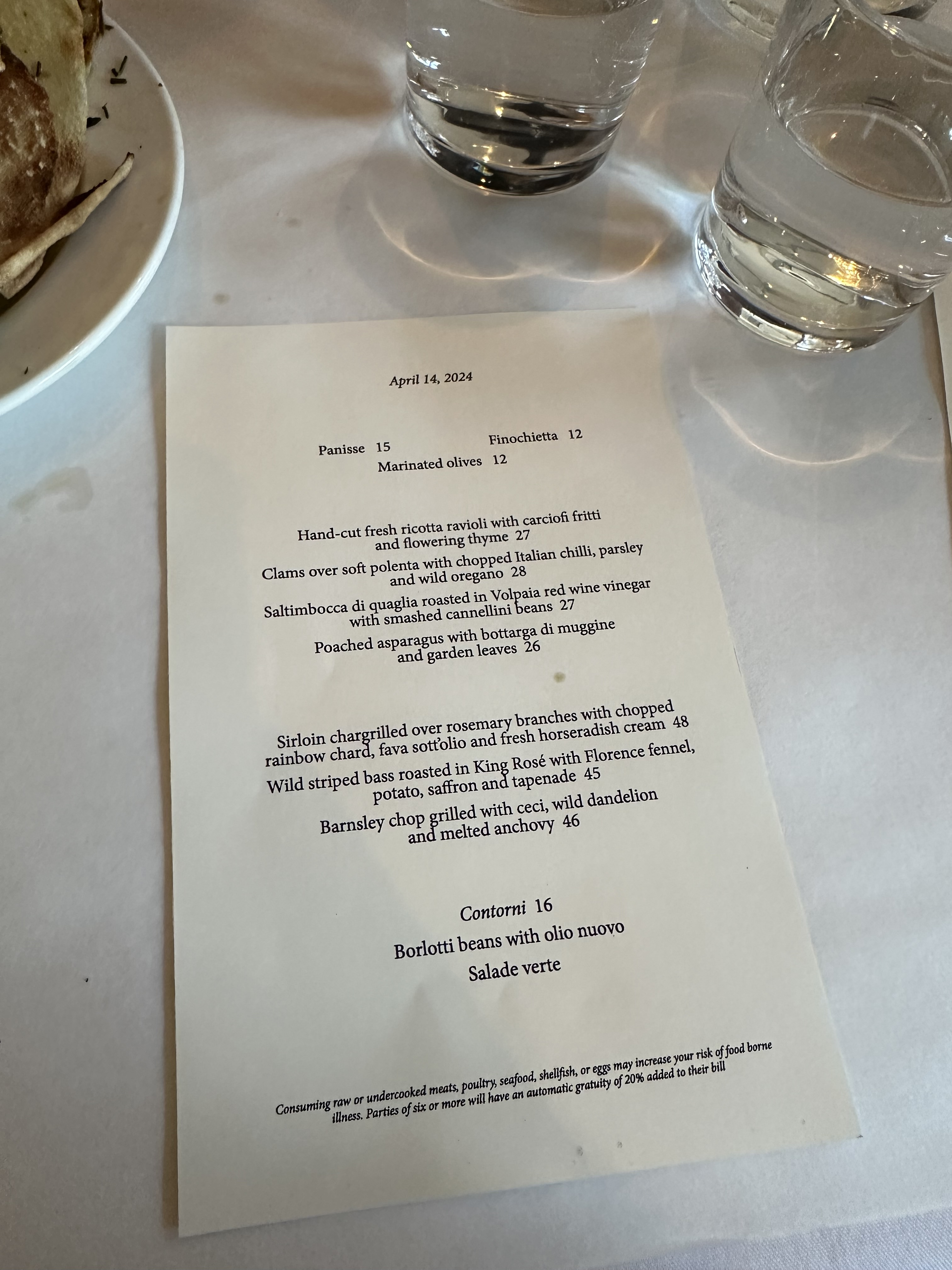
The dinner menu at King on 14 April 2024

Jess Shadbolt, Claire de Boer, and Annie Shi founded and own King. Shadbolt and de Boer met while they both worked at The River Café in London, and later met Shi, who was then working at The Clove Club. Before opening King, Shi and de Boer managed a "supper club" together, first in London and then in New York. The restaurant's interior was designed by de Boer's mother. King's operators originally searched for a space in Chinatown. King opened in September 2016, in a location previously occupied by the restaurant Mekong.

de Boer has compared the challenges of operating her upstate New York restaurant, Stissing House, to the challenges associated with operating King, saying that King has "no room" but a large number of potential diners, while Stissing House has "loads of room" and a much smaller pool of potential diners.

Shadbolt, de Boer, and Shi opened a second restaurant, Jupiter, in 2022.

== Menu and offerings ==
The menu at King changes daily, and staff determines what the restaurant will serve each morning. Many dishes do not contain protein, focusing instead on vegetables. Shadbolt, de Boer, and Shi have said they source ingredients from Union Square Market. The restaurant consistently features panisse on its menu, which de Boer attributed partially to the fact that the staff enjoys eating it with "a cold drink".

== Reviews and accolades ==
=== Reviews ===
Shauna Lyon, in a review published by The New Yorker, praised the restaurant's service and food.

=== Accolades ===
Jordana Rothman, writing for Food & Wine, included Shadbolt and de Boer on her 2018 list of the best new chefs in the United States. de Boer was nominated for the 2018 James Beard Award for "Rising Star Chef of the Year".

Pete Wells, the restaurant critic for the New York Times, included King on his 2023 and 2024 lists of the one hundred best restaurants in New York City. Wells emphasized King's interpretation of French and Italian cooking as his reason for including the restaurant on the lists.
