= I Sodi =

Italian restaurant in New York City

- Interactive map of I Sodi

Restaurant information
- Owner: Rita Sodi
- Food type: Tuscan
- Location: 314 Bleecker Street, New York City, New York, United States
- Coordinates: 40°44′0.2″N 74°0′18″W
- Website: isodinyc.com

I Sodi is an Italian restaurant in New York City. The restaurant opened in 2008, and was founded by Rita Sodi.

== History ==
Before opening I Sodi, Sodi was an executive at Calvin Klein. The restaurant began serving lunch in 2019. The restaurant reopened in a new location in July 2023, with its final night in its original location on 12 June 2023.

I Sodi is located in Greenwich Village, near Sodi and her Jody William's other establishments, Via Carota, Buvette, and Bar Pisellino.

== Reviews and accolades ==
=== Reviews ===
When it opened, the restaurant received positive reviews from critics. In The New York Times, Julia Moskin praised the restaurant, emphasizing the quality of its interior design, service, and the "authentic" menu. Lauren Collins, writing for The New Yorker also praised I Sodi's food and hospitable service.

The restaurant has remained popular with critics and diners. Pete Wells, the restaurant critic for The New York Times, referred to Rita Sodi as "one of the city’s great pasta practitioners" in a 2016 review. In a 2022 review published by Eater, Robert Sietsema wrote that the restaurant "perfectly mimics all aspects of a restaurant in Tuscany".

In October 2023, after the restaurant reopened in its new location, Pete Wells published a new, positive review of I Sodi.

=== Accolades ===
Food writer Carey Polis has referred to the restaurant as her favorite. I Sodi was first on a 2017 list of "The Absolute Best Italian Restaurants in New York" compiled by Grub Street.

Pete Wells placed I Sodi in sixty-fourth place in his 2023 ranking of the hundred best restaurants in New York City, and in thirty-fourth place on the 2024 list.

== See also ==
- List of Italian restaurants
