= Jody Williams (artist) =

American artist, writer, and teacher (born 1956)

- Born: January 26, 1956; Pittsburgh
- Died: October 17, 2023 (aged 67); Minneapolis
- Alma mater: Rochester Institute of Technology; Carleton College
- Occupation: Artist

Jody Louise Williams (January 26, 1956 - October 17, 2023) was an American artist, writer, and teacher. She created and published artist's books under the imprint Flying Paper Press in her studio in Minneapolis, Minnesota. She worked in a range of media, including artist's books, collages, drawings, etchings, bronze sculptures, and mixed-media boxes that she calls not-empty boxes.

Williams taught printmaking and book arts at the Minneapolis College of Art and Design and the Minnesota Center for Book Arts.

== Early life and education ==
Williams was born in Pittsburgh, PA on January 26, 1956. She grew up near Chicago in Evanston, IL. She learned to write her name when she was four years old so she could get her own library card, and her love of books eventually led her to making them herself. She credits her love for creating order out of chaos to growing up with five siblings (she was the third child of six total) in a family that moved four times before she was ten. In a 2016 artist statement, she wrote, "I found it necessary to keep my possessions small, contained, and protected. As an adult, the compulsion to collect, organize and find containers for things has remained with me, and has directed much of my artwork."

Williams earned a BA cum laude from Carleton College in Northfield, Minnesota, in 1978, and an MFA in printmaking from the Rochester Institute of Technology in Rochester, New York, in 1983.

== Work and career ==
Williams is perhaps best known for what art critic of the Minneapolis Star Tribune newspaper Mary Abbe called "meticulously designed miniature books". Williams also constructs intricate multi-part boxes and other containers that display artifacts and natural specimens, along the lines of the 17th-century Wunderkammer, or cabinet of wonders. Her work shows the influence of libraries, books, and research. The inclusion in her art of feathers, grasses, flower petals, seedpods, and other fragile fragments that Williams collects on walks and bike rides reflects her passionate interest in the natural world.

Observing, Thinking, Breathing: The Nancy Gast Riss Carleton '77 Cabinet of Wonders, permanently on display at the Gould Library at Carleton College in Northfield, Minnesota, is one of Williams's most complex works. The 48-inch-wide cabinet is divided into "observing", "thinking", and "breathing" sections. Reflecting the liberal-arts environment, it includes a tiny Periodic Table of Elements and beakers; a miniature desk with typewriter and a copy of The Ambassadors by Henry James on it; and samples of water, maple seeds, dried thistles, and other specimens Williams collected from the prairie land and the arboretum on campus. The work honers Nancy Gast Riss (Carleton College class of 1977), who died in 2002 of ovarian cancer.

In 2011 the Twin Cities PBS television show Minnesota Originals featured Williams and her book Small Orders, a tiny book of prints of invertebrates.

In addition to teaching at the Minneapolis College of Art and Design and Minnesota Center for Book Arts, Williams also taught and lectured across Europe and the United States, including at the University of Iowa Center for the Book. One colleague described her impact on the field: "Jody was the heart of book arts at MCAD, leaving an indelible mark on the Print Paper Book area."

=== Form+Content Gallery ===
Williams was an early member of Form+Content Gallery, an artist-owned and run gallery in downtown Minneapolis. Members show their own artwork and also curate shows from nonmember artists. Unlike most commercial or institutional galleries, Form+Content allows artists to retain control of their show.

=== Selected solo and group exhibitions ===
- 2022 – Not Here, Catherine G. Murphy Gallery, St. Paul, Minnesota
- 2016 – Shadows and Dust, Form+Content Gallery, Minneapolis, Minnesota; Circumstantial Evidence, solo exhibition at Augsburg College, Minneapolis
- 2015 – Codex International Book Arts Fair, Berkeley, California
- 2013–2016 – The Art of the Book, Canadian Bookbinders and Book Artists Guild

=== Selected public collections ===
- Carleton College, Northfield, MN
- Minneapolis Institute of Art, Minneapolis, MN
- Minnesota Historical Society, Saint Paul, MN
- Rochester Institute of Technology, Rochester, NY
- San Francisco Museum of Modern Art, San Francisco, CA
- Walker Art Center, Minneapolis, MN
- Yale University Library, New Haven, CT

=== Awards and nominations ===
- 2019 – Minnesota Book Artist Award
- 2013 and 2016 – Minnesota State Arts Board Artist Initiative Grant
- 2008 – Minnesota Book Artist Award, inaugural recipient
- 1995 – Minnesota Center for Book Arts/Jerome Foundation Book Arts Fellowship

== Personal life ==
Williams died "among friends in her South Minneapolis [Minnesota] home" on October 17, 2023.
