= Stissing House =

Restaurant in Pine Plains, New York

- Interactive map of Stissing House

Restaurant information
- Location: 7801 South Main Street, Pine Plains, New York, 12567, United States
- Coordinates: 41°58′46.5″N 73°39′23.5″W

Stissing House is a restaurant in Pine Plains, currently characterized as a "country tavern". Clare de Boer owns and operates Stissing House. Previously, a French restaurant, also called Stissing House, operated in the space occupied by de Boer's restaurant.

== History ==
The building in which Stissing House is located was completed in 1782, or 1783. From 1995 until 2021, the building was occupied by a French restaurant, also called Stissing House. The French restaurant was operated by Michel and Patricia Jean.

Clare de Boer became interested in purchasing and restoring the restaurant when she learned Michel and Patricia Jean intended to close it in 2021. The new restaurant's design draws inspiration from the Shakers. de Boer has compared the challenges of operating Stissing House to the challenges associated with operating her Manhattan restaurant King, saying that King has "no room" but a large number of potential diners, while Stissing House has "loads of room" and a much smaller pool of potential diners.

== Reception ==
=== French restaurant: 1995-2021 ===
Daniel Mochon, in a review published by the Poughkeepsie Journal, wrote a positive review of Stissing House in 2006, praising its decor and drinks.

=== New restaurant: 2021-present ===
==== Reviews ====
Writing for the Times Union, Susie Davidson Powell positively reviewed the restaurant's service and highlighted its buttermilk sherbet.

The New York Times included the restaurant on its third annual "New York Times Restaurant List" which tracks the 50 restaurants that "excite" critics and reporters associated with the newspaper the most in a given year.

New York Times wine critic Eric Asimov included the restaurant on a September 2023 list of restaurants and drinking establishments titled "Where to Drink Wine in the Hudson Valley". Asimov praised the restaurant for featuring "opportunities to splurge on slightly older vintages" and "less expensive options". The Infatuation included the restaurant on its 2023 list of the best restaurants in the Hudson Valley. Kat Odell, writing for Bloomberg, included the restaurant on a 2023 list of "Restaurants in Upstate New York Worth the Drive".

==== Awards ====
The restaurant was nominated for the 2023 James Beard Award for Best New Restaurant.
