= Alice Twemlow =

Graphic designer

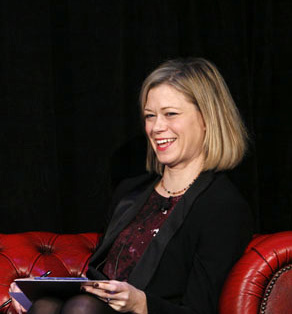
Twemlow in 2011

Alice Twemlow is a writer, critic and educator from the United Kingdom whose work focuses on graphic design. She has been a guest critic at the Yale University School of Art, Maryland Institute College of Art (MICA), and Rhode Island School of Design (RISD). In 2006, the School of Visual Arts (SVA) in New York named Twemlow the chair and co-founder of its Master of Fine Arts in Design Criticism (D-Crit). According to her SVA biography: "Alice Twemlow writes for Eye, Design Issues, I.D., Print, New York magazine and The Architect’s Newspaper." Twemlow is also a contributor to the online publication Voice: AIGA Journal of Design. In 2012 Core77 selected her as a jury captain for the "Design Writing and Commentary" category of the Core77 Design Awards. Twemlow was head of the MA in Design Curating & Writing at Design Academy Eindhoven, 2017–2018, and is now Lector Design at the Royal Academy of Fine Arts (KABK) in The Hague, and associate professor at Leiden University.

== Books ==
- StyleCity New York, Thames & Hudson, 2003. (ISBN 978-0500210079)
- What is Graphic Design For? (Essential Design Handbooks), RotoVision, 2006. (ISBN 978-2940361076)
- Sifting the Trash: A History of Design Criticism, MIT Press, 2017. (ISBN 978-0262035989)

== Magazine articles ==
- The Raw Materials of Fiction, Baseline 25, edited by Mike Daines & Hans Dieter Reichert, Bradbourne Publishing, 1998.
- Forensic Types, Eye, No. 54, Vol. 14 edited by John L. Walters, Haymarket, London, Winter 2004.
- The Decriminalization of Ornament, Eye, No. 58, Vol. 15 edited by John L. Walters, Haymarket, London, Winter 2005.
- Well Hung, Grafik Magazine, No. 126, February 2005. — An article on artist Ryan McGinness.
- No Muscles, No Tattoos, Eye, No. 61, Vol. 16 edited by John L. Walters, Haymarket, London, Autumn 2006.
