= Lita Talarico =

American graphic designer

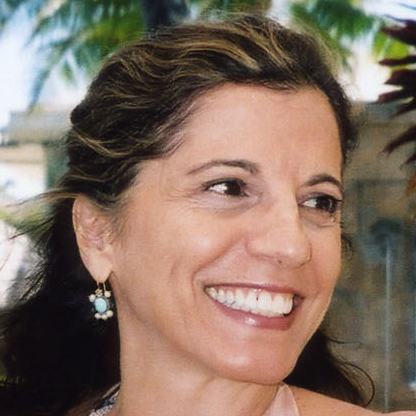
- Occupation: Several honorary positions

Lita Talarico is a co-founder and co-chair of the School of Visual Arts MFA Design Program in New York City. She also co-founded the SVA Masters Workshop in Italy, an ongoing summer program. She also teaches and lectures on design entrepreneurism around the world.

== Biography ==
Lita received her Bachelor's degree from Empire State College, and holds a Master's in Fine Arts degree from the School of Visual Arts. She is fluent in English, Italian and French.

== Work experience ==
A founding associate of Bill Lacy Design, she coordinated architect selection competitions and conferences for the Cleveland Museum of Art; National World War II Memorial Design Competition; International Design Conference in Aspen; Italian Manifesto Conference; and the Pritzker Architecture Prize annual jury meeting.

Talarico was the founding managing editor of American Illustration & Photography, a board-member emeritus of Adobe Education Partners by Design, and member of the AIGA Visionary Design Council. She was a visiting scholar at the American Academy in Rome in 2008 and 2010, where she conducted extensive research on the Roman letter.

Talarico's pupils have included Deborah Adler.

== Publications ==
- Typography Sketchbooks (Princeton Architectural Press)
- The Design Entrepreneur:Turning Graphic Design into Goods that Sell (Rockport Press)
- Graphic: Inside the Sketchbooks of the World’s Great Graphic Designers (Thames and Hudson)
- Design School Confidential (Rockport Press)
- Design Career: A Practical Guide for Beginning Illustrators and Graphic Designers (Van Nostrand Reinhold).
- Design Firms Open for Business (Allworth Press)
