= Jody Williams (chef) =

American chef and television personality (born c. 1963)

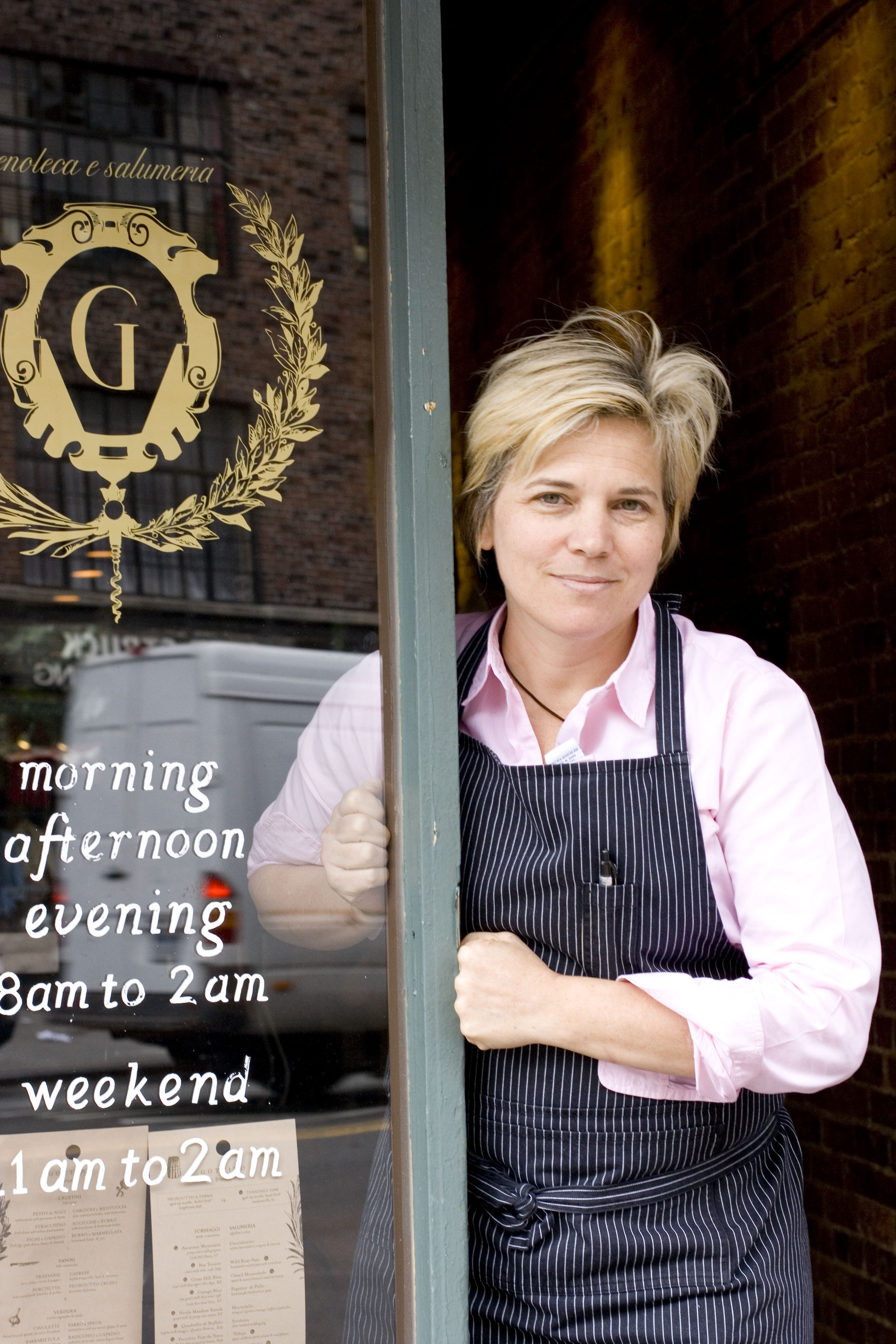
Chef Jody Williams

Jody Williams (born c. 1963 in California) is an American chef and television personality.

== Biography ==
Raised in California, Williams came to appreciate food service by assisting customers at her father's hot dog stand in Fisherman's Wharf, San Francisco. After relocating to New York City at the age of 24, she set out at 25 to prepare American cuisine across Italy with chef Kathy Casey. There, she learned about Italian cuisine. After she returned to the U.S., she became the chef of Italian restaurant Tappo (literally cork in Italian) in New York City, now closed. Williams was the chef at Morandi in New York City before she left the restaurant in May 2008. She was the chef of Gottino in New York City, a restaurant known for its wines, until May 2010. Since September 2009, she has appeared several times as a judge on the Food Network's competition series show Chopped.

Alongside business partner and wife Rita Sodi, Williams runs Via Carota, an Italian restaurant in New York City's Greenwich Village. She and Sodi also founded Commerce Inn in 2021. She also operates Buvette which has locations in New York City, Paris, Tokyo and London. Williams is the author of the cookbook Buvette: The Pleasure of Good Food.

== Personal life ==
Williams attended Centre College.

When I Sodi first opened, Williams lived in Greenwich Village. That led to her meeting Rita and they married in 2015.

== Awards and honors ==
Williams won the 2019 James Beard Award for Best Chef in New York City.

In 2013, opening Buvette in Paris led her to winning the French Le Fooding Award.
