= Jean-Claude Suares =

American graphic designer

Jean-Claude Suares (March 30, 1942 – July 30, 2013) was an artist, illustrator, editor, and creative consultant to many publications, and the first Op-Ed page art director at The New York Times.

== Biography ==
Suares was born on March 30, 1942, in Alexandria, Egypt, to a Sephardic father. He and his family moved from Egypt to Italy when he was a teenager. Later, he moved to New York City, where he briefly attended Pratt Institute. In the 1960s, he joined the U.S. Army paratroopers and was sent to Vietnam, where he worked on staff for Stars and Stripes. He also spoke several languages. In 1973, Suares arranged an exhibition of Op-Ed art at the Musée des Arts Décoratifs in Paris. For over 30 years his comic drawings appeared in The New York Times, on the covers of The New Yorker and The Atlantic Monthly, and in other periodicals and books. He wrote, edited or designed scores of illustrated books. He was also involved in book publishing. He worked with Jacqueline Kennedy Onassis at Doubleday. He also designed Michael Jackson’s autobiography, Moonwalk. Suares was in one movie in 1973, It Happened in Hollywood.

A resident of Harrington Park, New Jersey, Suares died on July 30, 2013, at Englewood Hospital and Medical Center in Englewood, New Jersey as a result of a bacterial infection. He was 71 and is survived by his wife of 33 years Nina Duran, and a sister.

=== Magazines worked on ===
- Changes
- Discover
- WWII Magazine
- Columbia College Today
- Connoisseur Magazine
- Armchair General Magazine
- Northeast Luxury Homes
- Men's Health
- Fit Pregnancy
- New York Magazine
- POZ
- JCK Luxury
- Buzz
- Walking
- MAMM
- Scanlan's Monthly
- 7 päivää
- The New York Times Book Review
- Wild West
- The Magazine of American History
- Aviation History
- Inc.
- Fast Company
- Variety
- Publishers Weekly
- Broadcasting & Cable
- Military History Monthly
- The Atlantic Monthly
- The New Yorker

Not a complete list.

=== Books worked on ===
- Sexy Dogs
- Women of Iron: the world of female bodybuilders
- Fat Cats
- Cool Mutts
- Alien creatures
- Great Cats: The Who's Who of Famous Felines
- Funny Babies
- Funny Dogs: Postcard Book
- Funny Puppies
- Funny Kittens
- American Anthem
- Cool Cats
- The Photographed Cat
- Hollywood Heavies
- Hollywood Cats
- Hollywood Christmas
- Hollywood Doctors
- Hollywood Weddings
- Hollywood Trains
- Hollywood Kids
- Hollywood Weddings
- The Literary Dog
- Passion for Roses
- Flight: a poster book
- The Illustrated Cat: a poster book
- Socks Goes to Washington: The Diary of America's First Cat
- City Dogs
- The Illustrated Flower
- Rocketship: An Incredible Voyage Through Science Fiction and Science Fact
- Black & White Dogs
- A Passion for Kittens
- The Snoopy Collection
- Crash Helmet
- The Nutty Joke Book
- Washington, D.C.
- The Rough
- Gruff Goat Brothers Rap
- Dog Box 24 Assorted Notecards and Envelopes
- Better Times: the indispensable guide to beating hard times
- Real Clothes
- The Big Book of Babies
- The Big Book of Horses
- The Big Book of Dogs
- The Big Book of Cats

Not a complete list.
