= Deborah Adler =

American designer

- Education: University of Vermont
- Occupation: Designer
- Awards: Design of the Decade: ClearRx Wins Gold Industrial Society of America (IDSA) presents ClearRx with the winning Gold and title “Design of the Decade”
- Honours: Deborah Adler joined the AIGA National Board of Directors CNBC Target: Inside the Bullseye ClearRx gets featured on the show. Museum of Modern Art New York, permanent collection Clear Rx featured in “Women Of Design”
- Website: adlerdesign.com

Deborah Adler (born 1975) is an American designer. Adler designed the prescription drug packaging, ClearRx, acquired by the Target Corporation.

== Early life and education ==
Adler was born on September 14, 1975, in Rockland County, New York, and raised in Chappaqua, New York. She attended the University of Vermont, receiving her BFA in 1997. Adler then studied design at the School of Visual Arts. She completed her MFA in 2002.

== Career ==
During her time at the University of Vermont, Adler's grandmother became ill, having accidentally taken her husband's medication through inability to distinguish what was in the package. This led Adler to redesign prescription bottles as a thesis project. The resulting creation, ClearRx, was distributed nationally by Target Corporation in its stores. An example of the ClearRx bottle is in the permanent collection of the Museum of Modern Art.

Adler’s latest design, AdlerRx, received a patent in 2021.
