= Alliance Graphique Internationale =

International organization of graphic artists and designers

Alliance Graphique Internationale (AGI) is a membership-based association of the world's leading graphic artists and designers. Some of its members have been responsible for the identity design of some of the world's top corporations and institutions, and created numerous examples of globally known packaging, publications, illustration and poster designs.

== History ==
In 1951 two Swiss and three French graphic artists decided to formalise their relationship into a kind of association. In 1952 the Alliance Graphique Internationale was incorporated in Paris with 65 members. The first AGI show was in Paris in 1955. In 1969 the AGI headquarters moved to Zürich.

The organization's most important events are the annual AGI Congress and AGI Open which take place in a different country each year.

Today, the AGI is a professional gathering, currently spanning seven decades and consisting of 512 creative professionals from 45 countries.

== List of AGI members ==
Name	Country	Year joined
Gaile Pranckunaite	Lithuania	2026
Carolin Himmel	Germany	2026
Ben Denzer	USA	2026
Darius Ou	Singapore	2026
Zach Lieberman	USA	2022
Yvo Haehlen	Switzerland	2022
Ying Hou	China	2022
Simone Trum	Netherlands	2022
Ruohan Wang	Germany	2022
Ricardo Báez	Venezuela	2022
Minmin Qu	China	2022
Qian Jiang	China	2022
Priscilla Balmer	Switzerland	2022
Özge Güven	Turkey	2022
Nejc Prah	Slovenia	2022
Loes van Esch	Netherlands	2022
Ksenya Samarskaya	USA	2022
Konrad Renner	Germany	2022
Jonathan Castro Alejos	Netherlands	2022
Irene Pereyra	Spain	2022
Rejane Dal Bello	UK	2022
Guodong Zhan	China	2022
Fraser Muggeridge	UK	2022
Erik van Blokland	Netherlands	2022
Christoph Knoth	Germany	2022
Byungrok Chae	South Korea	2022
Brian Thomas Collins	USA	2022
Arch MacDonnell	New Zealand	2022
Michael Amzalag	France (registered as Japanese member)	2020
Mathias Augustyniak	France (registered as Japanese member)	2020
Majid Abbasi	Iran	2009
Erik Adigard	US	2009
Roland Aeschlimann	Switzerland	1986
Zak Kyes	UK	2019
Yah-Leng Yu	Singapore	2018
Liza Enebeis	Netherlands	2018
Josefina Bunster	Chile	2018
Evi O.	Australia	2023
sang-soo ahn	South Korea	1999
José Albergaria	France	2010
Jorge Aldarete	Argentina/Mexico	2015
Cordula Alessandri	Austria	2003
Hans-Ulrich Allemann	US	1998
Walter Allner	US	1962
Yurdaer Altintas	Turkey	2009
Peter Andermatt	Switzerland	1971
Ian Anderson	UK	2010
Gordon Andrews	Australia	1969
Samuel Antupit	US	1974
Masuteru Aoba	Japan	1988
Philippe Apeloig	France	1997
Robert Appleton	Canada	2001
Dana Arnett	US	1998
Antoine Audiau	France	2012
Bob Aufuldish	US	2011
Paul Austin	UK	2010
Kiyoshi Awazu	Japan	1966
Bernard Baissait	France	1997 (Dismiss in 2001)
Franco Balan	Italy	1997
André Baldinger	France	2002
Andreu Balius	Spain	2010
Ludovic Balland	Switzerland	2010
Walter Ballmer	Italy	1970
Marian Bantjes	Canada	2008
Rik Bas Backer	France	2010
Saul Bass	US	1958
Franco Bassi	Italy	1970
Ruedi Baur	France	1992
Michael Baviera	Switzerland	1998
Edward Bawden	UK	1956
Herbert Bayer	US	1954
Lester Beall	US	1954
Timothy Beard	UK	2011
Anders Beckman	Sweden	1952
Anthon Beeke	Netherlands	1979
Dirk Behage	France	2010
Nick Bell	UK	2009
Félix Beltrán	Mexico	1974
Ephram E. Benguiat	US	1980
Francis Bernard	France	1954
Pierre Bernard	France	1987
Polly Bertram	Switzerland	1997
Xuefeng Bi	China	2006
John Bielenberg	US	2002
Michael S. Bierut	US	1989
Peter Bilak	Netherlands	2006
Joseph Binder	US	1954
Heribert Birnbach	Germany	2000
Bruce Blackburn	US	1981
Karl Oskar Blase	Germany	1963
Bernard Blatch	Norway	1993
Andrew Blauvelt	US	2007
Nicholas Blechman	US	2001
R.O. Blechman	US	1975
Walter Bohatsch	Austria	1997
Egidio Bonfante	Italy	1978
Hermann Bongard	Norway	1967
Irma Boom	Netherlands	1997
Ben Bos	Netherlands	1978
Günter Karl Bose	Germany	2000
Pierre Boucher	France	1952
Paul Boudens	Belgium	2008
Michel Bouvet	France	1997
Helmut Brade	Germany	2003
Peter Bradford	US	1974
Erik Brandt	US	2012
Pieter Brattinga	Netherlands	1975
Erich Brechbühl	Switzerland	2007
Walter Breker	Germany	1956
Tony Brook	UK	2006
Peter Brookes	UK	1988
James Brown	Australia	2013
Donald Brun	Switzerland	1951
Dick Bruna	Netherlands	1978
Wim Brusse	Netherlands	1952
Mayo Bucher	Switzerland	1997
Stephan Bundi	Switzerland	2001
Will Burtin	US	1955
Andrew Byrom	US	2012
Fritz Bühler	Switzerland	1951
Feliks Büttner	Germany	1993
Georges Calame	Switzerland	1967
Mel Calman	UK	1974
Margaret Calvert	UK	1976
Fang Cao	China	2004
Frederick Vincent Carabott	UK	1968
Ken Carbone	US	1997
Erberto Carboni	Italy	1952
Alois Carigiet	Switzerland	1957
Jean Carlu	France	1952
Matthew Carter	US	1978
Jacqueline Casey	US	1974
A.M Cassandre	France	1955
Mimmo Castellano	Italy	1981
Dr Kenneth W. Cato AO	Australia	1978
Pierluigi Cerri	Italy	1985
Alan Chan	-	2014
Alvin Chan	Netherlands	2007
Vladimir Chaïka	Russia	1999
Ivan Chermayeff	US	1978
Seymour Chwast	US	1975
Roman Cieslewicz	France	1966
Giulio Cittato	Italy	1976
Stephen Coates	UK	1998
Flavia Cocchi	Switzerland	2012
Jean Colin	France	1951
Paul Colin	France	1955
Jeanette Collins	UK	1977
Giulio Confalonieri	Italy	1967
Muriel Cooper	US	1983
Silvio Coppola	Italy	1975
Thomas Couderc	-	2014
Paul Cox	France	2003
Jeremy Coysten	UK	2012
Bart Crosby	US	1997
Theo Crosby	UK	1966
James Cross	US	1975
Wim Crouwel	Netherlands	1957
Ronald Curchod	France	2005
Richard Danne	US	1974
Louis Danziger	US	1974
Jean David	Israel	1957
Paul Brooks Davis	US	1974
Michel De Boer	Netherlands	1998
Rudolph De Harak	US	1963
Esther De Vries	-	2014
Wout De Vringer	Netherlands	2002
Lizá Defossez Ramalho	Portugal	2007
Mike Dempsey	UK	1998
Marion Deuchars	UK	2000
Alexandre Dimos	-	2014
Theo Dimson	Canada	1977
Bob Dinetz	US	2004
Pierre DiSciullo	France	2010
Lou Dorfsman	US	1955
Stephen Doyle	US	1996
William Drenttel	US	2010
Markus Dressen	Germany	2004
Jacques Dubois	France	1952
Gert Dumbar	Netherlands	1978
Sonya Dyakova	UK	2013
Tatsuo Ebina	Japan	2001
Tom Eckersley	UK	1952
Heinz Edelmann	Germany	1963
Hermann M. Eggmann	Switzerland	1972
Rick Eiber	US	1997
Hermann Eidenbenz	Switzerland	1952
Olle Eksell	Sweden	1952
Dick Elffers	Netherlands	1952
Garry W. Emery	Australia	1978
Klaus Ensikat	Germany	1993
Bülent Erkmen	Turkey	1998
Mario Eskenazi	Spain	1997
Simon Esterson	UK	1998
Roger Excoffon	France	1952
Oded Ezer	Israel	2009
Hans Fabigan	Austria	1965
Germano Facetti	UK	1966
Sara Fanelli	UK	2000
Kiko Farkas	Brazil	2006
Ben Faydherbe	Netherlands	2002
Gene Federico	US	1960
Diego Feijóo	Spain	2013
Mário Feliciano	Portugal	2009
Isidro Ferrer	Spain	2000
Dieter Feseke	Germany	2003
Detlef Fiedler	Germany	2000
Louise Fili	US	1998
Enzo Finger	Norway	1993
Jeffrey Fisher	UK	1996
Gilles Fiszman	Belgium	1974
Willy Fleckhaus	Germany	1976
Josef Flejšar	Czech Republic	1981
Allan Robb Fleming	Canada	1974
Alan Fletcher	UK	1966
Karin Fong	US	2001
Colin Forbes	US	1966
Francesco Franchi	Italy	2019
André François	France	1952
Barnett Freedman	UK	1952
Tobias Frere-Jones	US	2014
Vince Frost	UK	2001
Adrian Frutiger	Switzerland	1980
Shigeo Fukuda	Japan	1979
Osamu Fukushima	Japan	2012
Paul Marcus Fuog	Australia	2017
Martin Gaberthüel	Switzerland	1998
Louis Gagnon	Canada	2010
Jacques Nathan Garamond	France	1951
Ken Garland	UK	2013
Christof Gassner	Germany	1988
Reinhard Gassner	Austria	2000
Pierre Gauchat	Switzerland	1952
Martin Gavler	Sweden	1952
Tom Geismar	US	1975
K. Domenic Geissbühler	Switzerland	1968
Steff Geissbühler	US	1980
David Gentleman	UK	1972
Michael Gericke	US	1998
Stephen Gilmore	UK	2012
George Giusti	US	1955
Milton Glaser	US	1975
Keith Godard	US	1997
James Goggin	US	2010
Carin Goldberg	US	1998
Andrew Goldstein	Germany	2012
Jeffrey Goldstein	Germany	2012
Tomás Gonda	US	1980
Nikki Gonnissen	Netherlands	2012
Baruch Gorkin	US	2001
Fritz Gottschalk	Switzerland	1975
Mark Gowing	Australia	2013
Milner Gray	UK	1952
J. Malcolm Grear	US	1998
Robert M. Greenberg	US	1994
April Greiman	US	1985
Franco Grignani	Italy	1952
Frieder Grindler	Germany	1976
Joost Grootens	Netherlands	2010
Yu Guang	-	2014
Chengcheng Guo	-	2013
Igor Gurovich	Russia	2013
Fernando Gutiérrez	UK	1997
Stefan Guzy	Germany	2016
O.H.W Hadank	Germany	1955
Helfried Hagenberg	Germany	1999
Ebrahim Haghighi	Iran	2001
Jiaying Han	China	2007
Aage Sikker Hansen	Denmark	1952
Kenya Hara	Japan	2001
Rolf P. Harder	Canada	1974
George Hardie	UK	1994
Hans Hartmann	Switzerland	1958
Niels Hartmann	Denmark	1967
Julia Hasting	US	2000
Kazunari Hattori	Japan	2011
Daniela Haufe	Germany	2000
Ashley Havinden	UK	1952
Luke Hayman	US	2011
Jianping He	Germany	2005
Jun He	China	2008
Yiyang Hei	China	2012
Jessica Helfand	US	2010
Steven Heller	US	2010
F.H.K Henrion	UK	1952
Walter Herdeg	Switzerland	1952
Richard Hess	US	1972
Fons Hickmann	Germany	2004
Ernst Hiestand	Switzerland	1968
Ursula Hiestand	Switzerland	1968
David Hillman	UK	1976
Hans Hillmann	Germany	1961
George Him	UK	1952
Kit Hinrichs	US	1990
Keiko Hirano	Japan	2011
Hara Hiromu	Japan	1966
Masaaki Hiromura	Japan	2012
Hans Peter Hoch	Germany	1974
Armin Hofmann	Switzerland	1967
Dominic Hofstede	Australia	2023
Paul Hogarth	UK	1969
Max Huber	Switzerland	1958
Lam Hung	China	2011
Thomas Huot-Marchand	France	2010
Allen Hurlburt	UK	1972
Angus Hyland	UK	1999
Takenobu Igarashi	Japan	1981
Melchior Imboden	Switzerland	1998
Alexander Isley	US	1998
Norman Ives	US	1967
Marcel Jacno	France	1952
Jonathon Jeffrey	UK	2011
Werner Jeker	Switzerland	1989
Radovan Jenko	Slovenia	-
Hua Jiang	China	2006
Dan Jonsson	Sweden	1981
Alex(ander) Jordan	France	1989
Maira Kalman	US	2007
Tibor Kalman	US	1996
YUSku Kamekura	Japan	1955
Tai-Keung Kan	China	1997
Herbert W. Kapitzki	Germany	1958
Sadik Karamustafa	Turkey	1997
Hjalti Karlsson	US	2009
Kaoru Kasai	Japan	2006
Aimo Katajamäki	Finland	2013
Mitsuo Katsui	Japan	1984
Michalis Katzourakis	Greece	1968
Pat Keely	UK	1952
Johnny Kelly	Ireland	2012
Timothy Kelleher	New Zealand	2023
Itoh Kenji	Japan	1966
Sano Kenjiro	Japan	2013
Frith Kerr	UK	2011
Martin Kerschbaumer	Italy	2018
Erik Kessels	Netherlands	2012
Chip Kidd	US	1998
Günther Kieser	Germany	1963
Atsuki Kikuchi	Japan	2014
Do-hyung Kim	Korea	2012
Jock Kinneir	UK	1976
Max Kisman	Netherlands	2002
Issay Kitagawa	Japan	2001
Alan Kitching	UK	1994
Peter Knapp	France	1989
René Knip	Netherlands	2005
Jacques Koeweiden	Netherlands	1997
Takashi Kono	Japan	1961
Elisabeth Kopf	Austria	2006
Stanislav Kovář	Czech Republic	1969
Burton Kramer	Canada	1974
Thomas Kronbichler	Italy	2018
Henrik Kubel	UK	2007
Willi Kunz	US	1998
Mervyn Kurlansky	Denmark	1970
Björn Kusoffsky	Sweden	2000
Ruedi Külling	Switzerland	1968
David Lancashire	Australia	1996
Eric Lancaster	France	1952
Admin Last	-	-
Freeman Lau Siu Hong	China	2002
Roger Law	UK	1994
Alain Le Quernec	France	1989
Matthew Leibowitz	US	1955
Jan Lenica	Poland	1956
Anette Lenz	France	1999
Michel Lepetitdidier	France	2003
Jeremy Leslie	UK	2011
Herbert Leupin	Switzerland	1952
Jean-Benoit Levy	Switzerland	1998
Jan Lewitt	UK	1952
Tommy Li	China	2004
Harmen Liemburg	-	-
Stig Lindberg	Sweden	1952
Rico Lins	Brazil	1997
Leo Lionni	US	1955
Domenic Lippa	UK	2005
Zhizhi Liu	China	-
Flemming Ljorring	Denmark	1980
Sascha Lobe	Germany	2009
Uwe Loesch	Germany	1988
Celso Longo	Brazil	2013
Helmut Lortz	Germany	1954
Charles Loupot	France	1955
Jingren Lu	China	2006
Herbert Lubalin	US	1960
Chi Cheong Luk	China	2012
Italo Lupi	Italy	1981
Alvin Lustig	US	1955
Hans-Rudolf Lutz	Switzerland	1992
Emanuele Luzzati	Italy	1972
Huimin Ma	-	-
Michael Mabry	US	2000
Laurence Madrelle	France	1994
Alejandro Magallanes	Mexico	2004
P. Scott Makela	US	1997
Jean-Dennis Malclès	France	1952
Eduardo Manso	Spain	2010
Riccardo Manzi	Italy	1956
Javier Mariscal	Spain	1995
Carlos Augusto Martins Lacaz	Brazil	2010
Pablo Martín	Spain	2000
Les Mason	Australia	1975
John Massey	US	1967
Robert Massin	France	2001
Keizo Matsui	Japan	1997
Shin Matsunaga	Japan	1988
Kei Matsushita	Japan	2003
Herbert Matter	US	1955
Holger Matthies	Germany	1976
John McConnell	UK	1975
Katherine McCoy	US	1986
Edward McKnight Kauffer	UK	1952
Fernando Medina	Spain	1979
Peter Megert	Switzerland	1974
Fanette Mellier	-	2014
Pierre Mendell	Germany	1980
Peter Mendelsund	US	2012
Saed Meshki	Iran	2002
Frédéric Metz	Canada	1998
Rudi Meyer	France	1993
Anthony Michael	UK	1998
Gérard Miedinger	Switzerland	1970
James Miho	US	1995
Tomoko Miho	US	1974
Paul Mijksenaar	Netherlands	2013
Ken Miki	Japan	1998
Armando P. Milani	Italy	1981
J. Abbott Miller	US	1998
Philippe Millot	France	2000
Etienne Mineur	France	2000
Jan Mlodozeniec	Poland	1974
Morteza Momayez	Iran	1977
Bruno Monguzzi	Italy	1979
Isolde Monson-Baumgart	Germany	1976
Germán Montalvo Aguilar	Mexico	1997
John Morgan	UK	2011
Antonio Morillas i Verdura	Spain	1966
Jennifer Morla	US	1998
Peter Moser	Switzerland	2000
Jósef Mrosczak	Poland	1966
Hamish Muir	UK	2004
Bruno Munari	Italy	1952
Martti Mykkänen	Finland	1966
Lars Müller	Switzerland	1993
Rolf Müller	Germany	1976
Josef Müller-Brockmann	Switzerland	1952
Kazufumi Nagai	Japan	2011
Kazumasa Nagai	Japan	1966
Keisuke Nagatomo	Japan	2001
Hideki Nakajima	Japan	1998
Makoto Nakamura	Japan	1985
Flávia Nalon	Brazil	2013
Stephanie Nash	UK	1998
Andreas Netthoevel	Switzerland	1998
Hans Neuburg	Switzerland	1967
Yung-Chen Nieh	Taiwan (Chinese Taipei)	2012
Christoph Niemann	US	1999
Richard Niessen	-	2014
Minoru Niijima	Japan	1998
Erik Nitsche	US	1964
Bob Noorda	Italy	1966
Finn Nygaard	Denmark	1997
Henrik Nygren	-	2014
Sabina Oberholzer	Switzerland	1997
Siegfried Odermatt	Switzerland	1974
Justus Oehler	Germany	2003
Tadashi Ohashi	Japan	1966
Hiroshi Ohchi	Japan	1955
Bruno Oldani	Norway	1976
Vaughan Oliver	UK	2012
Clotilde Olyff	Belgium	2004
Michel Olyff	Belgium	1962
Anukam Edward Opara	US	2011
István Orosz	Hungary	2003
Anders Osterlin	Sweden	1959
Nicolaus Ott	Germany	1997
R.D.E. Oxenaar	Netherlands	1978
Julian Palka	Poland	1956
Gábor Palotai	Sweden	2002
Kum-jun Park	South Korea	2008
Ben Parker	UK	2010
Alejandro Paul	Argentina	2011
Arthur Paul	US	1978
Harry Pearce	UK	2005
David Pearson	UK	2012
Harry Peccinotti	France	1975
Alan Peckolick	US	1978
B. Martin Pedersen	US	1987
Remy Peignot	France	1957
Sean Perkins	UK	2010
Giorgio Pesce	Switzerland	2003
Michael Peters	UK	1979
Thom Pfister	Switzerland	2011
Roger Pfund	Switzerland	1981
Felix Pfäffli	Switzerland	2013
Volker Pfüller	Germany	1997
Celestino Piatti	Switzerland	1957
Jean Picart le Doux	France	1951
David Pidgeon	Australia	2006
Kari Piippo	Finland	1997
Cipe Pineles-Burtin	US	1955
Giovanni Pintori	Italy	1952
Woody T. Pirtle	US	1980
Josep Pla-Narbona	Spain	1963
David Plunkert	US	2011
Santiago Pol	Venezuela	1997
Leif Podhajsky	Australia	2023
Dean Poole	New Zealand	2010
Hans-Georg Pospischil	Germany	1988
Fábio Prata	Brazil	2013
Robert Probst	US	1997
Matt Pyke	UK	2009
Jan Rajlich sen.	-	-
Jan Rajlich	Czech Republic	1981
Gunter Rambow	Germany	1974
Elaine Ramos	Brazil	2012
Michael Rand	UK	1976
Hermann Rastorfer	Austria	1966
Brian Rea	US	2012
Artur Rebelo	Portugal	2007
Hans Dieter Reichert	UK	2003
Edgar Reinhard	Switzerland	1982
Dan Reisinger	Israel	1970
Lex Reitsma	Netherlands	1997
Roger R. Remington	US	2012
Jacques Richez	Belgium	1952
Jean Robert	Switzerland	1986
Lucienne Roberts	UK	2013
Ernst Roch	Canada	1974
Gabriela Rodriguez Valencia	Mexico	1998
Sarah Rosenbaum	Norway	1993
David Ruiz	Spain	1997
John Rushworth	UK	1994
Marte Röling	Netherlands	1978
Ruedi Rüegg	Switzerland	1971
Mehdi Saeedi	US-IRAN	2017
Guy Saggee	Israel	2012
Stefan Sagmeister	US	1998
Paul Sahre	US	2005
Makoto Saito	Japan	1994
Arnold Saks	US	1968
Roberto Sambonet	Italy	1975
Willem Sandberg	Netherlands	1952
Kashiwa Sato	Japan	2011
Koichi Sato	Japan	1988
U. G. Sato	Japan	1998
Taku Satoh	Japan	1998
Raymond Savignac	France	1952
Peter Saville	UK	2011
Yasuhiro Sawada	Japan	2001
Gerald Scarfe	UK	1988
Clemens Theobert Schedler	Austria	1998
Paula Scher	US	1993
Hans Schleger	UK	1952
Georg Schmid	Austria	1963
Helmut Schmid	Germany	1988
Max Schmidt	Switzerland	1967
Gerwin Schmidt	Germany	2003
Hans Günter Schmitz	Germany	1997
Niels Schrader	Netherlands	2010
Ralph Schraivogel	Netherlands	1995
Jurriaan Schrofer	Netherlands	1966
Arnold Schwartzman	US	1974
Ronald Searle	UK	2003
James Sebastian	US	1998
Serge Serov	Russia	2013
Chen Shaohua	China	2000
Adrian Shaughnessy	UK	2011
Imatake Shihiro	Japan	1957
Ghobad Shiva	Iran	2001
Mariano Sigal	Argentina	2014
Jorge Silva	Portugal	2011
António Silveira Gomes	Portugal	2010
Louis Silverstein	US	1969
Nancy Skolos	US	1998
Finn Sködt	Denmark	1997
David Smith	Ireland	2010
Edo Smitshuijzen	Netherlands	1988
Leslie Smolan	US	1997
Lanny Sommese	US	1998
Xiewei Song	China	2003
Leonardo Sonnoli	Italy	2000
Alvaro Sotillo	Venezuela	1997
Kris Sowersby	New Zealand	2013
Ariane Spanier	Germany	2013
Herbert Spencer	UK	1966
Todd St. John	-	2014
Anton Stankowski	Germany	1956
Franciszek Starowieyski	Poland	1966
Astrid Stavro	Spain	2010
Bernard Stein	Germany	1997
Albe Steiner	Italy	1955
Heiri Steiner	Switzerland	1952
Henry Steiner	China	1980
Jennifer Sterling	US	2000
André Stolarski	Brazil	2012
Swip Stolk	Netherlands	2000
Shinnoske Sugisaki	Japan	2001
Jaroslav Sura	Czech Republic	1981
Yuri Surkov	Russia	2000
Deborah Sussman	US	1985
Josef Svoboda	Czech Republic	1968
Waldemar Swierzy	Poland	1966
Fumio Tachibana	Japan	2006
Ikko Tanaka	Japan	1966
David Tartakover	Israel	1998
Paolo Tassinari	Italy	2005
Tiit Telmet	Canada	1998
Lucille Tenazas	US	1998
Evelyn ter Bekke	France	2010
Frédéric Teschner	France	2010
Patrick Thomas	UK	2005
Bradbury Thompson	US	1955
Peter Till	UK	1998
Rosmarie Tissi	Switzerland	1974
Henryk Tomaszewski	Poland	1957
Feliks Topolski	UK	1956
Pino Tovaglia	Italy	1967
Daniel Trench	Brazil	2013
Otto Treumann	Netherlands	1952
Alex Trochut	Spain	2011
Fred Troller	US	1974
Annik Troxler	Switzerland	2013
Niklaus Troxler	Switzerland	1989
Paula Troxler	-	2014
George Tscherny	US	1965
Barrie Tucker	Australia	1979
Richard James Turley	US	2013
Alice Twemlow	US	2013
Mehmet Ali Türkmen	Turkey	2009
Andreas Uebele	Germany	2007
Ryosuke Uehara	Japan	2013
Arne Ungermann	Denmark	1952
Maciej Urbaniec	Poland	1974
Rick Valicenti	US	1998
Julien Vallée	Canada	2013 (left in 2019)
Richard van der Laken	Netherlands	2012
Jelle Van der Toorn Vrijthoff	Netherlands	1978
Bob van Dijk	Netherlands	2006
Jan Van Toorn	Netherlands	1972
Michael Vanderbyl	US	1986
Yarom Vardimon	Israel	1982
Mihaly Varga	Switzerland	1999
Kyösti Varis	Finland	1974
Clément Vauchez	-	2014
Jukka Veistola	Finland	1975
Tomàs Vellvé	Spain	1967
Pier Paolo Vetta	Italy	2003
Massimo Vignelli	US	1965
Bernard Villemot	France	1952
Jonas Vögeli	Switzerland	2010
Douglas Wadden	US	1998
Henning Wagenbreth	Germany	2002
Heinz Waibl	Italy	1976
Garth Walker	South Africa	2002
Min Wang	China	2004
Xu Wang	China	2000
Yue Fei Wang	China	2002
Teeranop Wangsillapakun	Thailand	2016
Manuel Warosz	France	2012
Russell Warren-Fisher	UK	2004
Kurt Weidemann	Germany	1975
Markus Weisbeck	Germany	2011
Mason Wells	UK	2011
Hugo Wetli	Switzerland	1967
Thomas Widdershoven	Netherlands	2012
Jean Widmer	France	1976
Bruno K. Wiese	Germany	1974
Jan Wilker	US	2009
Marina Willer	UK	2007
Scott Williams	UK	2007
Kurt Wirth	Switzerland	1956
Benno Wissing	US	1966
Hans Wolbers	Netherlands	2002
Henry Wolf	US	1966
Demian Conrad	Switzerland	2017
Robert Wong	US	2013
Stanley Wong	China	2004
Martin Woodtli	Switzerland	2000
Yong Wu	China	2012
Richard Saul Wurman	US	1986
Lance Wyman	US	2013
Tamotsu Yagi	US	1990
Ryuichi Yamashiro	Japan	1966
Bingnan Yu	China	1992
Garson Yu	US	2006
Lu Yu	China	2004
Hermann Zapf	Germany	1980
Catherine Zask	France	1997
Mark Zeugin	Switzerland	1967
Jian Zhao	China	2004
Qing Zhao	China	2010
Liu Zhizhi	China	2010
Zdenek Ziegler	Czech Republic	1981
Jorg Zintzmeyer	Switzerland	1997
Pepijn Zurburg	Netherlands	2012
Michiel Schuurman	Netherlands	2018
Hansje van Halem	Netherlands	2017
Jiangping Fang	China	2018
Ricardo Báez	Venezuela	2022
Fan Ding	China	2018
Stuart Ash	Canada	1974

== Publications ==
- AGI- Graphic Design since 1950, by Elly and Ben Bos, Thames & Hudson Publishers 2007, ISBN 978-0-500-51342-2
- Alliance Graphique International - German Members, Hesign Publisher 2011, ISBN 978-3-9810544-4-6
