= Pablo Martín =

Pablo Martín may refer to:

- Pablo Martín Arteaga (born 1965), Spanish wheelchair basketball player
- Pablo Martín Asuero (born 1967), Spanish orientalist
- Pablo Pérez Álvarez (Pablo Martín Pérez Álvarez, born 1969), Venezuelan politician
- Pablo Martín Abal (born 1977), retired Argentine swimmer
- Pablo Lima (Pablo Martín Lima Olid, born 1981), Uruguayan footballer
- Pablo Batalla (Pablo Martín Batalla, born 1984), Argentine footballer
- Pablo Martín Ledesma (born 1984), Argentine footballer
- Pablo Miranda (Pablo Martín Miranda, born 1984), Argentine footballer
- Pablo Bangardino (Pablo Martín Bangardino, born 1985), Argentine footballer
- Pablo Martín (golfer) (born 1986), Spanish golfer
- Martín Perafán (Pablo Martín Perafán, born 1987), Argentine footballer
- Pablo Martín Ruiz (born 1987), Argentine footballer
- Pablo Lacoste (Pablo Martín Lacoste Icardi, born 1988), Uruguayan footballer
- Pablo Martín (graphic designer) (Pablo Martín Badosa, born 1964), creative director and graphic designer
