= Mehdi Saeedi =

Iranian-American artist and designer

- Born: 4 September 1979 (age 46); Tehran, Iran
- Known for: Graphic design, visual artist
- Awards: Five Stars Designers
- Website: mehdisaeedi.com

Mehdi Saeedi (Persian: مهدی سعیدی, born in Tehran) is an Iranian-born artist and designer based in Philadelphia and he is a part-time faculty of graphic design at the Towson University in Maryland, United States. His aesthetics have become a mainstay of design in many regions, especially in those using the Arabic and Iranian scripts as their alphabet.

His specialty in typography and calligraphy is the shaping of letters in forms and shapes (Zoomorphism) in graphic design. He also applies the principles of calligraphy in type design. Mehdi created the "Letters Melody" art and graphic design course and teaches this in Iran's Universities as well as at some international workshops.

In 2013, he also founded First International Exhibition of Type Design, as part of Silver Cypress. biennial, a competition that devoted to Persian type design for the first time.

In consideration of Mehdi Saeedi's artworks, a large number of them have been selected for exhibition in many prominent museums, collections, major domestic and international exhibitions worldwide. They have also been published in several reputable international magazines. Mehdi won several prestigious and well-grounded awards both locally and internationally resulting in becoming known as the most awarded Iranian graphic designer in Iran's graphic history Among which are: Grand Prize, Taiwan International Poster Design Award, Taiwan, 2007; Grand Prize, "Five Stars Designers' Banquet", International Invitational Poster Triennial of Osaka, Japan, 2009; Top Award, 15th International Invitational Poster, Colorado, United States, 2007; First Prize, 12th International Poster Triennial, Ekoplagat ́11, Slovakia, 2011 and Gold Medal in "Graphis poster annual 2013", USA etc.

Mehdi Saeedi's publications include 2013's From Contour to Calligraphy. He is also included among 30 designers in the second edition of New Masters of Poster Design.

His works are featured in The History of Graphic Design. Vol. 2, 1960–Today's book.

He is also an AGI (Alliance Graphique Internationale) member.

== Publications ==
Three books of Mehdi Saeedi's collection of works have been published, in both English and Persian. In 2005, Mehdi's first collection of works, Mehdi Saeedi: Collection of Graphic Works 1999–2004 (ISBN 9786006413082), was published by Tehran Museum of Contemporary Art. The book consists of approximately 70 color reproductions of posters and 46 logos and includes two introductions, by fellow Iranian graphic designer Ghobad Shiva (AGI) and French designer Thierry Sarfis.

A second book, From Script to Calligraphy: Collection of Mehdi Saeedi's Posters, is a collection of Mehdi's works in a decade and was published in Germany in 2008.

In 2013, Mehdi published the book From Contour to Calligraphy. This book is a collection of his works through 14 years of professional efforts demonstrating Mehdi's approach to figurative calligraphy (Zoomorphism or Tasvir-Negari) and Graphic Design. The content of the book is divided into three sections. The first section consists of art pieces that inspired by traditional Persian calligraphy, and the second and third sections are based on works utilizing contemporary design titled "Modern Persian1" and "Modern Persian2". This book begins with introductions by renowned visual artists including: Alain Le Quernec (AGI) from France, Rene Wanner and Niklaus Troxler (AGI) from Switzerland, U.G Sato (AGI) from Japan and Aydin Aghdashloo from Iran. In addition, Mehdi authored 5th generation of young Iranian graphic designers, a book of selected works of those who were born in the 1970s and 80s and pioneered in having different look on contemporary Iranian posters. Mehdi Saeedi is also featured in various world valid publications and collections that among them are:Learn World Calligraphy that offers a unique glimpse of scripts worldwide and the calligraphers who write them and Covering nearly all of the world's writing systems, New Masters of Poster Design that features around 30 top poster designers currently working all over the world, Atlas of Graphic Designers a comprehensive collection illustrates the world of graphic design country by country, featuring the best graphic designers from all over the world., 1000 Type Treatments and The Design of Dissent that examined graphic work focusing on social and political concerns from around the globe and is written and designed by Milton Glaser and Ilic'.

== Honours and awards ==
- Grand Prix, Exhibition of Visual Arts, Iran, 1998 & 1999
- Honourable Mention, The 7th International Biennial of Poster, Mexico, 2002
- Special Award, Poster Design Competition: "Books, Children and the Family", Iran, 2003
- Diploma of Honour, The 1st Book Cover Design Exhibition in the 16th Tehran International Book Fair, Iran, 2003
- First Prize, The 1st International Biennial of the Islamic World Poster, Iran, 2004
- Book Selection, Centre Georges Pompidou, France, 2004
- Art Residency, Cite, Paris, France, 2004–2005
- Honouring Scientific and Cultural Elite, Saudi Arabia, 2006
- Letter of Commendation, Tehran Municipality Art, Iran, 2006
- Third Prize, "4th Block" 6th International Triennial of Eco Posters and Graphics Art, Ukraine, 2006
- Special Award, 6th Trnava International Poster Triennial, Slovakia, 2006'
- Top Award, 15th International Invitational Poster, Colorado, USA, 2007
- Grand Prize, Taiwan International Poster Design Award, Taiwan, 2007
- First Prize, 1st Competition of Best Self-promotional Logo Design, Iran, 2008
- Honourable Mention, 2nd International Socio-Political Poster Biennial, Poland, 2008
- Grand prize, "Five Stars Designers' Banquet", International Invitational Poster Triennial of Osaka, Japan, 2009'
- Art Residency, Academy Solitude, Stuttgart, Germany, 2009
- Third Prize, International Biennial of Graphic Design of the Islamic World, Iran 2010
- Honourable Mention, 17th Colorado International Invitational Poster Exhibition, USA, 2011
- Art Residency, Guestroom Maribor, Slovenia, 2011
- Bronze Medal, Taiwan International Poster Design Award, Taiwan, 2011
- First Prize, 12th International Poster Triennial, Ekoplagat´11, Slovakia, 2011
- Honourable Mention, The 4th International Socio-Political Poster Biennial, Poland, 2012
- Fourth prize, 12 International Triennial of the Political Poster Show, Mons, Belgium, 2013
- Special Award, Taiwan International Design Award, Taiwan, 2013
- Gold Medal, Graphis Poster Annual 2013, USA
