= Philippe Apeloig =

French graphic designer and typographer (born 1962)

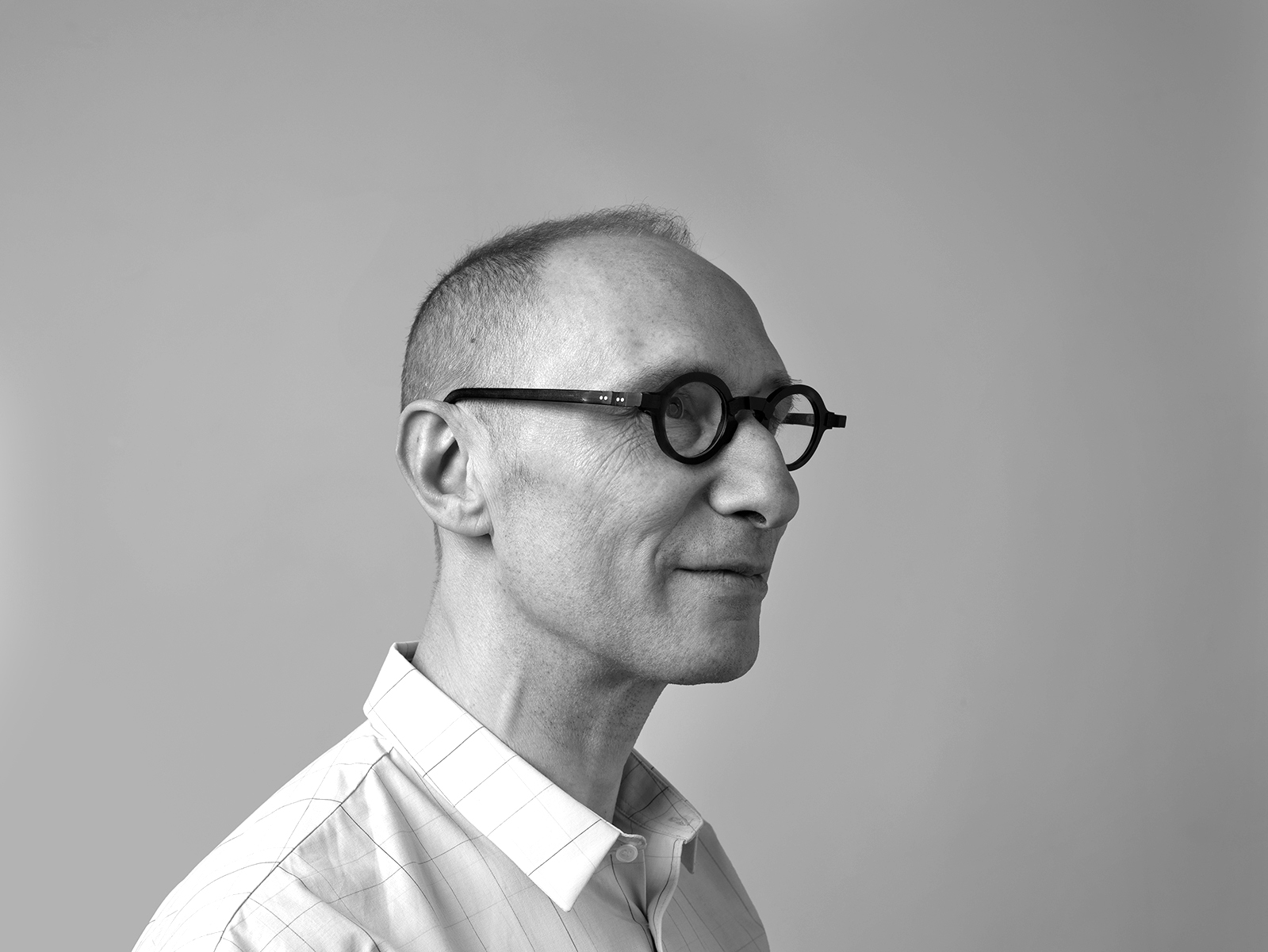
- Apeloig photographed by Aatjan Renders, 2018
- Born: 20 November 1962
- Alma mater: École Duperré
- Occupation: Designer, graphic designer, typographer
- Awards: Officier of the Ordre des Arts et des Lettres (2025); resident at the Villa Medici (1993)
- Website: apeloig.com

Philippe Apeloig (born 1962 in Paris) is a French graphic designer and typographer.

== Biography ==
Philippe Apeloig studied at the École supérieure des arts appliqués Duperré, then at the École nationale supérieure des arts décoratifs. It was during two internships undertaken in 1983 and 1985, at Wim Crouwel's Total Design in Amsterdam, that he became particularly interested in typography.

Philippe Apeloig began his career as a graphic designer in 1985 at Musée d’Orsay, where he implemented the visual identity conceived by Bruno Monguzzi and Jean Widmer, and created the poster for the first exhibition Chicago, naissance d’une métropole. In 1988, he obtained a grant from the Ministère des Affaires Étrangères and set off to work in Los Angeles with April Greiman. Back from California, Apeloig created his own studio in Paris in 1989, and became art director for the magazine Le Jardin des Modes.

In 1993–1994, he was a Fellow at l'Académie de France à Rome, Villa Médicis, where he developed original typographic fonts. From this work he obtained the Gold Award from the Tokyo Type Director Club. He was named art consultant of the Louvre museum in 1997, and became its art director from 2003 to 2007.

From 1992 to 1998, Philippe Apeloig has taught typography and graphic design at the École nationale supérieure des arts décoratifs (Ensad). In 1998, he moved to the United States for five years where he taught at the Rhode Island School of Design in Providence, Rhode Island, and at the Maryland Institute College of Art in Baltimore, Maryland. In 1999, he was hired Full-time faculty by the Cooper Union School of Art of New York, where he also occupied the position of curator of the Herb Lubalin Study Center of Design and Typography.

Philippe Apeloig has created the logotypes and visual identities for Musée de France, for the Musée d’art et d’histoire du judaïsme for its opening in 1997 in Paris, the IUAV (Istituto Universitario di Architettura di Venezia) in Venice, the Châtelet Théâtre in Paris, the estate group Icade, Médiateur européen, the year of Brazil in France Brésil-Brésils (2004), the year Cézanne in Aix-en-Provence (2006), the Palais de la Découverte (2010), the Petit Palais – Musée des Beaux Arts de la Ville de Paris, the French Institute / Alliance Française of New York (FIAF), the Louvre Abu Dhabi, Puiforcat, the cinema Le Balzac, and l'Ameublement français (a French professional union that represents furniture industries and companies). He works with the publishers Flammarion, La Martinière, Le Serpent à Plumes, Phaidon, PUF, and Robert Laffont. He has been the official poster artist for the Fête du Livre d’Aix-en-Provence since 1997, and he has designed many other posters, among them one for the Yves Saint Laurent retrospective at the Petit Palais in Paris in 2010. He has designed posters for numerous exhibitions, including Bateaux sur l’eau rivières et canaux for the Voies navigables de France, in Rouen. In 2013, he designed the visual identity for the Saut Hermès at the Grand Palais in Paris. In 2015, the Maison Hermès also engaged him to create the numerals of the Hermès Slim watch, as well as to design a silk and cashmere shawl for men celebrating the centennial of the birth of Roland Barthes, and the logotype of the review Le Monde d'Hermès in 2019.

He creates the visual identity The Manufacture de Sèvres (National ceramic factory), who offered him to create visuals on threes ceramic table services in 2017. This project has been exposed in the Parisian gallery of the Manufacture de Sèvres.

At the occasion of the 70th Anniversary of the Universal Declaration of Human Rights, SNCF Gares & Connexions (the society in charge of the railway stations in France) invited him to display a typographical interpretation of the fundamental text, in over a hundred station.

In 2015 and 2019, he exposes drawings and watercolors at the Parisian gallery Gilles Drouault Galerie / Multiples.

In October 2018, the French publishing house, Gallimard, released Philippe Apeloig's book: Enfants de Paris, 1939–1945. This voluminous object (1,100 pages) gathered all the Second World War commemoraties plaques in Paris. At the crossroads of typography and history, this graphic piece shows an original vision of the French capital. For this book, Philippe Apeloig received the Prix Thiers de l’Académie française.

Many of Philippe Apeloig's designs belong to the collections of the MoMA, the SFMOMA, the LACMA, the Bibliothèque Nationale de France, the Musée des Arts Décoratifs à Paris, the Stedelijk Museum of Amsterdam, the Smithsonian's Cooper-Hewitt National Museum of New York, the Museum für Gestaltung of Zurich, the Maison du Livre et de l'Affiche de Chaumont, the Deutsches Plakat Museum in Essen, the Poster Museum à Lahti and the Ogaki Poster Museum au Japon.

Philippe Apeloig is member of the Alliance Graphique Internationale (AGI).

He was named Chevalier des Arts et des Lettres in 2011.

== Awards and honors ==
- Elected a member of Alliance Graphique Internationale (AGI) (1997)
- Gold Award of the Tokyo Type Directors Club (1995) for the posters Octobre ouvre la saison en musique and Octobre fait danser la saison
- Premier Award, International TypoGraphic Awards, ISTD International Society of Typographic Designers (2004), London, for the poster Bateaux sur l’eau, rivières et canaux for Voies navigables de France
- Golden Bee Award, Golden Bee 6, Moscow International Biennale of Graphic Design (2004), category « Posters », for the poster Vis pour nous / Vis sans nous
- First Prize, Five Star Designers’ Banquet, International Invitational Poster Biennial Osaka (2006), prize and exhibition organized by University of Arts of the City of Osaka, for his body of work
- Gold Award of the Hong Kong International Poster Triennial (2007) for the poster Kenzaburo Ōé: je suis de nouveau un homme
- Golden Bee Award, Golden Bee 8, Moscow International Biennale of Graphic Design (2008), for the poster Vivo in Typo
- Premier Award, International TypoGraphic Award (2009), ISTD International Society of Typographic Designers, London, for the book Typography 29. TDC Annual. Call for Entries
- Overall Winner of the International Society of Typographic Designers of London (2009) for the series of posters Season 2008/2009, Théâtre du Châtelet
- Jagda Excellence Award (2012) for the poster Kodo Dadan
- Gold Medal, Icograda Excellence Award et Jagda Excellence Award, Taiwan International Graphic Design Award (2013), for the posters Street Scene (Théâtre du Châtelet), Le Saut Hermès au Grand Palais (Hermès) and Kodo Dadan Theatre du Châtelet)
- Iconograda Excellence Award (2013) for the poster Saut Hermès au Grand Palais
- Gold Medal of Taiwan International Graphic Design Award (2013) for the poster Street Scene
- Lahti Prix, Lahti Poster Triennial (2014), Lahti Art Museum, Finlande for the poster Bruits du monde (Fête du livre d'Aix-en-Provence)
- Premier Award, International TypoGraphic Award (2014), ISTD International Society of Typographic Designers, London, for the posters created for the National Theatre of Toulouse (Seasons 2012–13 and 2013–14).
- Golden Bee Award, Golden Bee (2014), Moscow International Biennale of Graphic Design, for the poster Théâtre national de Toulouse Midi-Pyrénées, Season 2013–14
- Bronze Award, International Poster Triennal (2014), Hong Kong, category «Promotion of Cultural Events», for the poster Théâtre national de Toulouse Midi-Pyrénées, Season 2012–13
- Prix Thiers (2019) of the Académie française, for the book Enfants de Paris, 1939–1945 by Gallimard publisher

== Fonts ==
Philippe Apeloig is the creator of numerous fonts, published since 2013 by the type foundry Nouvelle Noire Type Foundry.

== Books ==
- (en) Philippe Apeloig, The Spiral, the Hand and the Menorahauteurs, Gabriele Capelli Editore Sagi, 2002 (ISBN 8887469016)
- (en) Jean Widmer, a Devotion to Modernism, The Herb Lubalin Study Center of Design and Typography, New York, 2003, 96 p. (ASIN B0006S5L8M)
- (en) (fr) Philippe Apeloig, Inside the Word/Au Cœur Du Mot, Lars Muller Publishers, 2005 (ISBN 3907078411)
- (en) (fr) Philippe Apeloig, Typorama, Les Arts Décoratifs/Thames & Hudson, 2013 (ISBN 9782916914435)
- (fr) Philippe Apeloig, à la Racine de la Lettre, Design Friends, 2015
- (fr) Philippe Apeloig, Chroniques graphiques, Tind éditions, 2016
- (en) Philippe Apeloig, Philippe Apeloig, GGG Books, 2017
- (fr) Philippe Apeloig, Enfants de Paris, 1939–1945, Gallimard, 2018

== Selected exhibitions ==
Solo exhibitions

- 1988, "Philippe Apeloig, affiches", Galerie Impression, Paris
- 1990, "Philippe Apeloig, affiches", Centre Arc-en-Rêve, Bordeaux
- 1997, "Poster in the context of French culture", Galerie GGG, Tokyo; Gallerie DDD, Osaka
- 1999, "AA", Cooper Union School of Art, Houghton Gallery, New York
- 2000, "Le musée s'affiche/Posters for Museums", La Maison Française at New York University, New York
- 2001, "Au cœur du mot", Galerie Anatome, Paris
- 2003, "Philippe Apeloig, affiches", La Médiatine, Brussels
- 2003, "Philippe Apeloig, affiches", Galerija Avla NLB, Ljubljana
- 2004, "Philippe Apeloig, affiches", Dawson College, Montréal
- 2005, "Typo/Typé", Carré Sainte-Anne, Montpellier; Musée d'Art Russe, Kiev
- 2005, "Play Type", The University of the Arts, Philadelphia
- 2008, "Vivo in Typo", Espace Topographique de l'art, Paris
- 2009, "La typographie animée/The animated typography", Université de Québec, Montréal
- 2010, "Portes", gravures, Atelier Didier Mutel, Paris
- 2010, "OrienTYPOccident" avec Reza Abedini, Centre Culturel Français, Damas
- 2013, "Typorama. Philippe Apeloig, design graphique", Les Arts Décoratifs, Paris
- 2014, "Typo Apeloig", Cité du Livre, Aix-en-Provence
- 2015, "Using Type", Stedelijk Museum, Amsterdam
- 2016, "Tremblements essentiels", galerie de Multiples, Paris
- 2017, "Apeloiggg", GGG Gallery, Tokyo
- 2017, "Apeloig à Sèvres", galerie de Sèvres, Paris
- 2018, "TypoApeloig. Un parisino en América", Casa de América, Madrid
- 2019, "TypoApeloig. Un parisino en América", Centro University, Mexico
- 2019, "Des coupes et Découpes", watercolors, galleries de Multiples, Paris

Group exhibitions

- 2001, "Typojancai", Seoul Arts Center Design Gallery, Séoul
- 2004, "Grafist 8", Université des Beaux Arts de Mimar Sinan, Institut Français d'Istanbul, Istanbul
- 2004, "19ème biennale internationale de l'affiche", Wilanow Poster Museum, Varsovie
- 2006, " Five stars' designers banquet", Osaka University of Arts, Osaka
- 2011, " Graphisme et création contemporaine", Bibliothèque nationale de France, Paris
- 2011, "Wim Crouwel – A graphic odyssey", Design Museum, Londre
- 2011, "Bewegte Schrift", exposition de groupe, Museum für Gestaltung, Zürich
- 2011–2012, "Type in Motion", Fundación Barrie, Vigo
- 2012, "Graphic Design: Now in Production", co-organized by the Smithsonian Cooper-Hewitt Museum, New York, and the Walker Art Center, Minneapolis
- 2012, "20 Iconos del diseño Francés: L'Émoi du design", Institut Français, Madrid
- 2015, "How Posters Work", Smithsonian's Cooper-Hewitt National Museum, New York
- 2015, "Villissima", Hôtel des Arts, Toulon
- 2017, "Typomania", Musée de Moscou
- 2017, "Design Week", Saint-Pétersbourg

== Notes and references ==
1. (en) Collection du MoMA
2. (fr)Collection de la Bibliothèque nationale de France
3. (en)Collection du Smithsonian's Cooper Hewitt Museum de New York
4. (de)Collection du Museum of Design Zurich
5. (en)Apeloig Type Library, Nouvelle Noire Type Foundry
