= Rolf Müller (designer) =

German graphic designer (1940–2015)

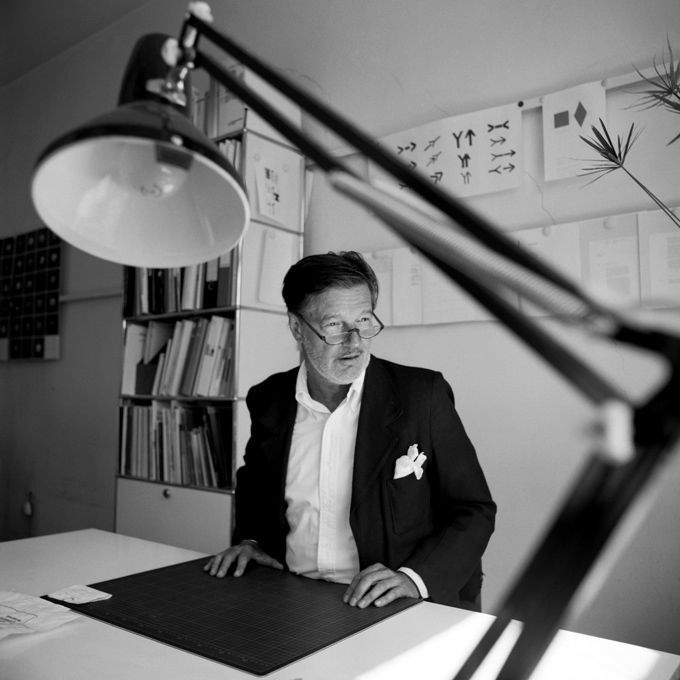
- Rolf Müller, 2001
- Born: 15 December 1940; Dortmund, Germany
- Died: 18 February 2015 (aged 74); Munich, Germany
- Known for: Design

Rolf Müller (December 15 1940 – February 18, 2015, in Munich) was a German graphic designer. He was a member of the Alliance Graphique Internationale. He worked on visual design for the 1972 Summer Olympics. The central themes of his creative work were corporate design, the development of information and orientation systems, posters, publications and exhibitions.

== Biography ==
Müller studied at the Ulm School of Design and then worked for the Swiss graphic designer Josef Müller-Brockmann. From 1967 to 1972, he worked with the team of Otl Aicher, which developed the visual identity of the 1972 Summer Olympics in Munich and its mascot Waldi. He became deputy design officer of the organizing committee for the games. In 1972 he founded the Rolf Müller office for visual communication in Munich. Rolf Müller designed and realized visual appearances, developed information and orientation systems, designed publications and posters. For Heidelberger Druckmaschinen he developed the magazine HQ (High Quality), which at the time set standards in printing technology and design. He has lived in Munich since 1967 and has a daughter, the designer Anna Lena von Helldorff. Since the end of the 1990s he took a teaching position, u. a. at the Ravensburg School of Design. In 2008 he received the design award of the City of Munich, and in 2009 a retrospective of his work took place. In 2014 the monograph Rolf Müller: Stories, Systems, Signs which he helped to edit, was published.

== Works ==
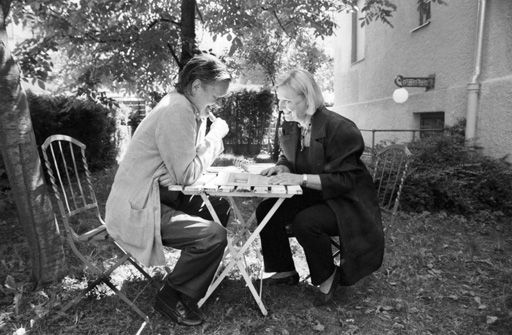
Rolf Müller, Munich 2003

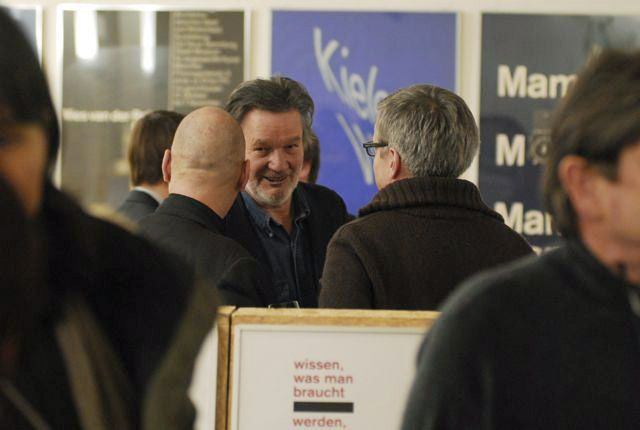
Rolf Müller, at the retrospective of his works, Munich 2009

- Corporate Design of the city Leverkusen, 1971–1992
- Broschüre über Willy Brandt, 1971, Endauflage 1,2 Mio., das erfolgreichste Wahlkampfportät seiner Zeit
- Offizielles Plakat der Kieler Woche, 1972
- Information system of the Stadthaus in Bonn, 1973–1977
- Design-Objekt Spiegelfaltung am Stadthaus in Bonn, 1974–1977 (Aufstellung 1979)
- Information system of the Offizierschule der Luftwaffe in Fürstenfeldbruck, 1976–1979
- Gabor Schuhmode, Rosenheim, 1977–1987
- Ausstattung 11. Olympischer Kongress Baden-Baden, 1981
- Corporate Design Bavaria Film, Munich, 1980–1989
- Corporate Design cultural center Gasteig, 1982–1984
- Corporate Design der Drägerwerk Aktiengesellschaft, Lübeck, 1983–2000
- HQ High Quality, Zeitschrift über das Gestalten, das Drucken und das Gedruckte, Heidelberger Druckmaschinen, 1985–1998
- Corporate Design MBB, Munich, 1988–1994
- Corporate Design IBA, Internationale Bauausstellung Emscher Park, Gelsenkirchen, 1990–1994
- Public relation Flughafen München GmbH, 1985–1993
- Innenansichten unseres Parlaments. Der 12., 13. und 14. Deutsche Bundestag. Official book of the Federal Republic of Germany, 1993–2000
- EXPO 2000 Sachsen-Anhalt, Dessau, 1996–1998
- Prinzregententheater Munich, 1996
- Corporate Design of the city Kufstein, 1996–1998
- Corporate Design Bayerische Staatsgemäldesammlungen, Munich, 1996–1998
- Poster Kunstgewerbeverein, Munich, 2001
- Brochures Allianz, Munich, ab 1999
- Corporate Design Links und rechts der Ems, Regionale 2004, 2002–2004

== Awards ==
- gold medal from the Art Directors Club of New York 1989
- German Prize for Communication Design 1993: Award for the highest design quality
- Die 100 besten Plakate des Jahres 1997 des Verbandes der Grafik-Designer e.V. for the poster Glückskinder
- Book Art Foundation: the most beautiful books 1995 and 1998.

== Gallery ==
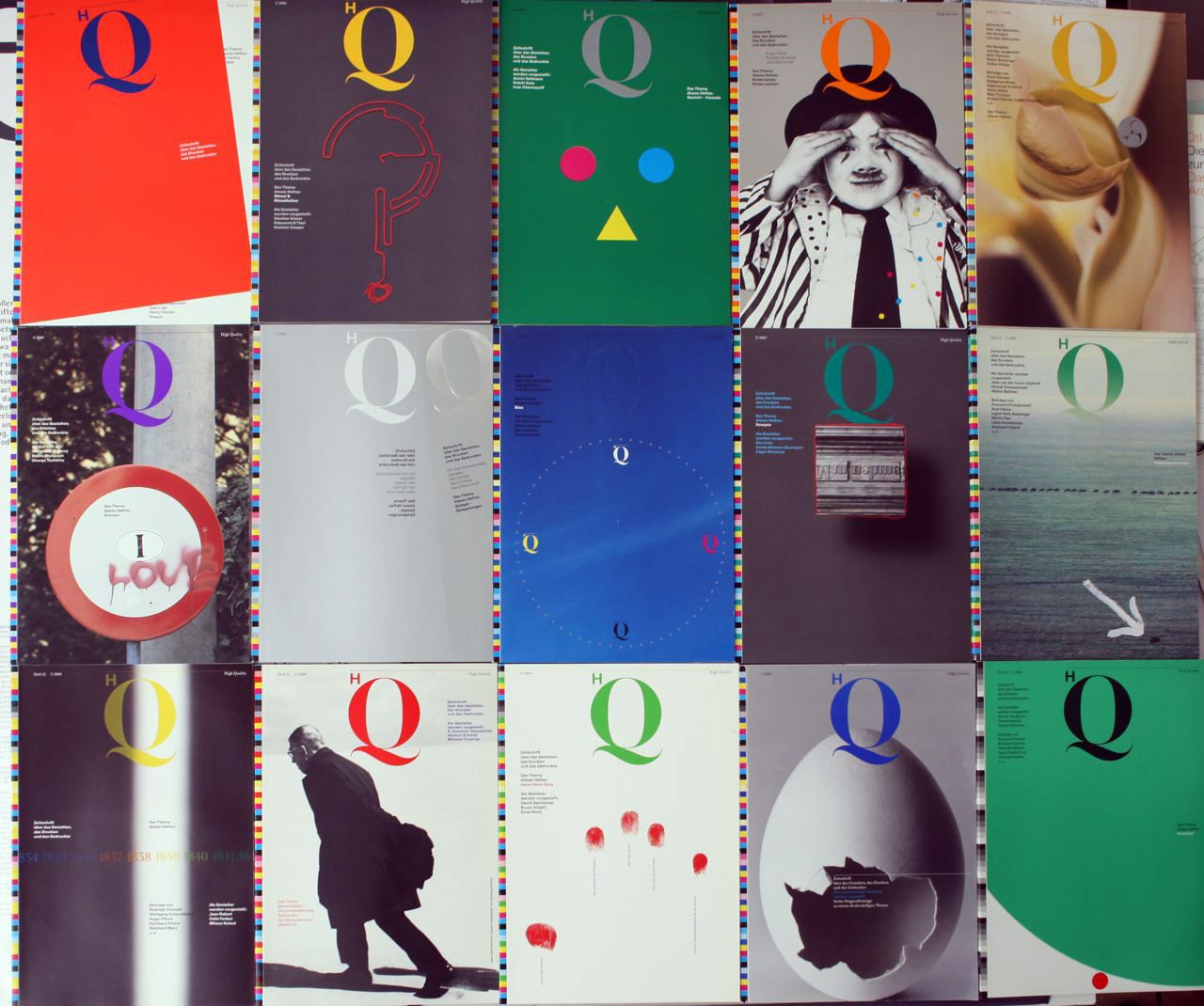
Various titles in the magazine High-Quality

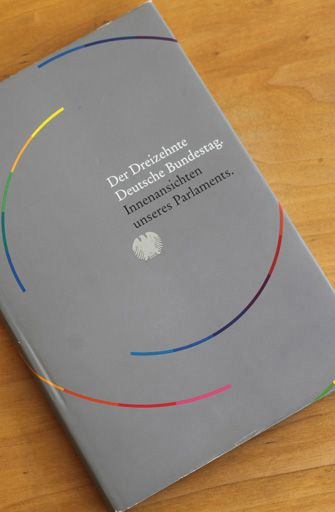
Official book of the Federal Republic of Germany

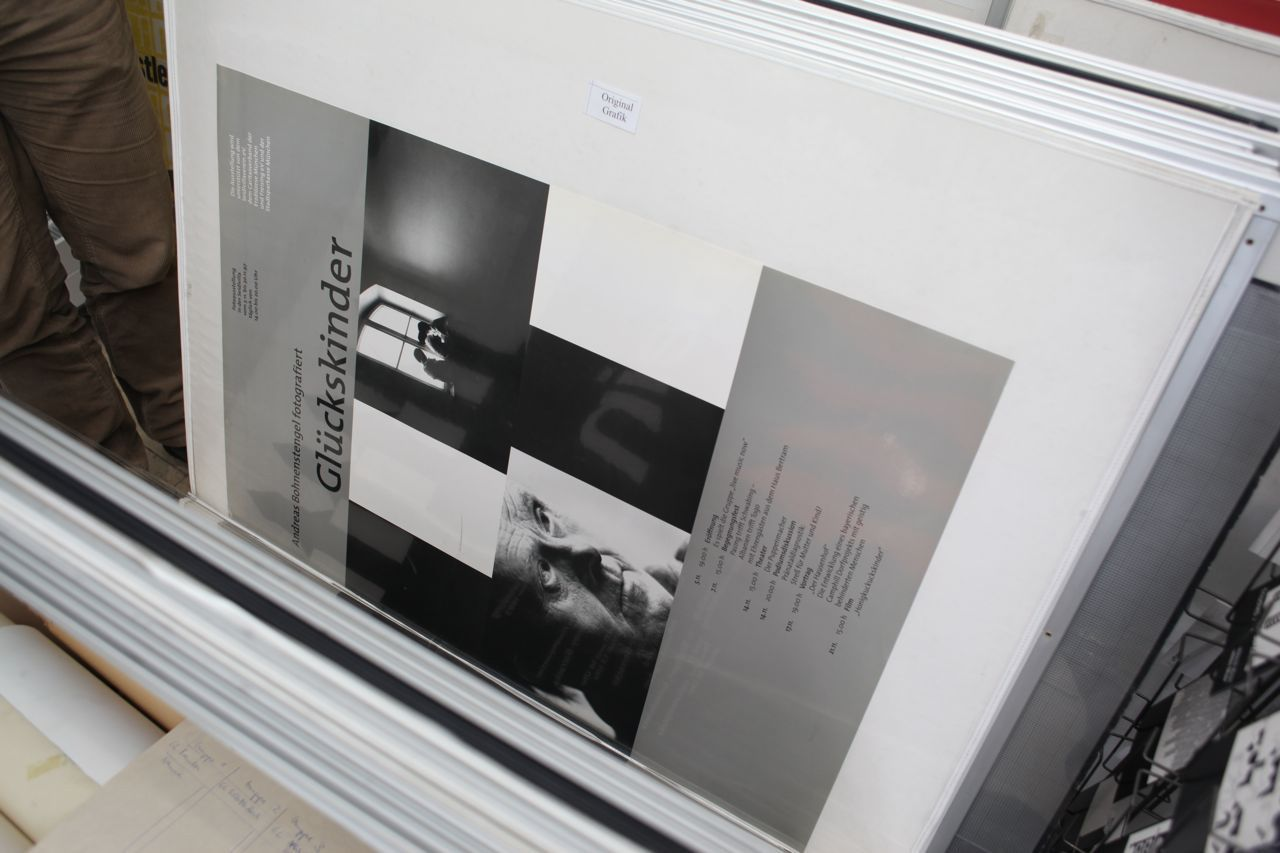
Exhibition poster Glückskinder

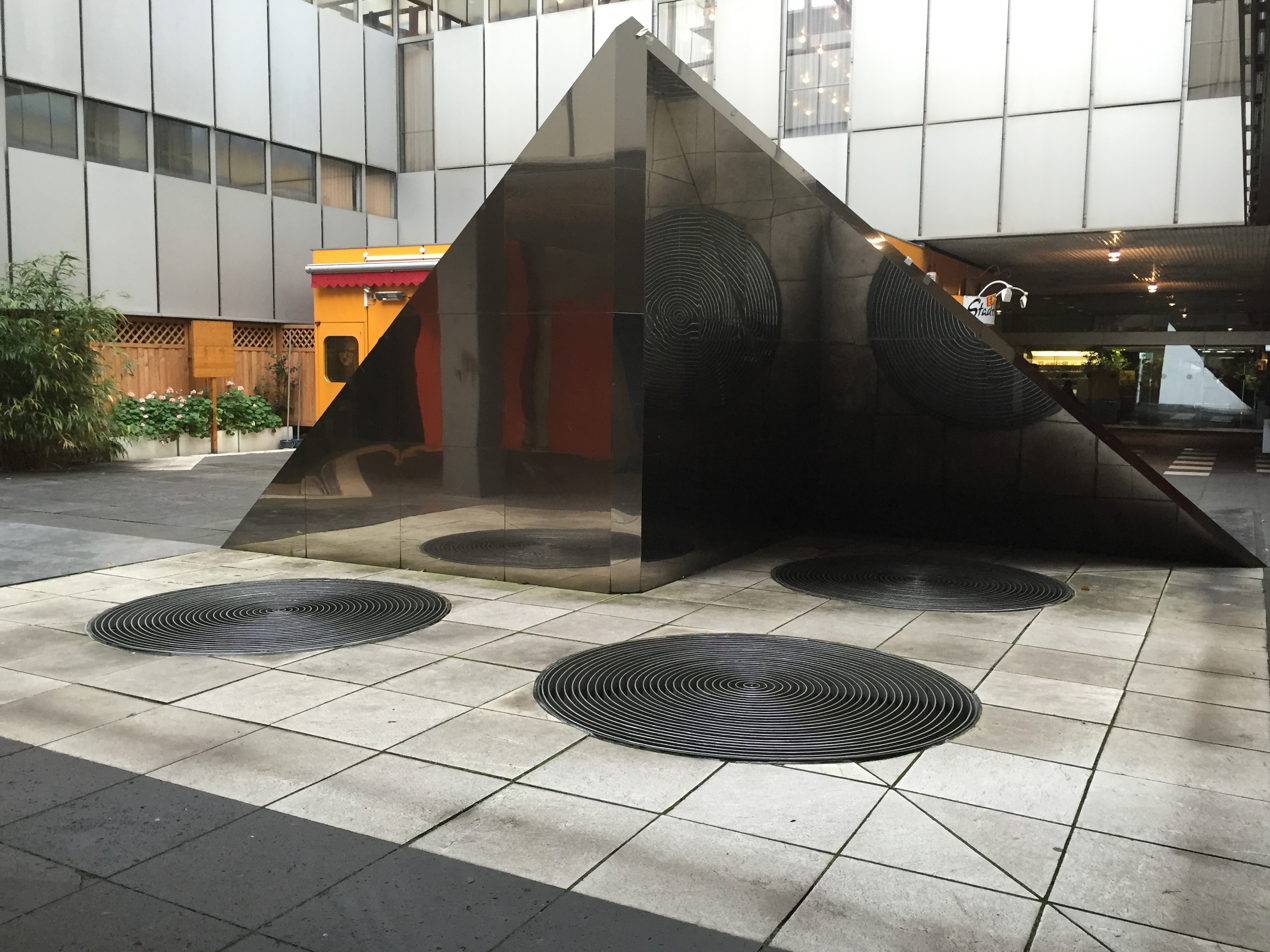
Artwork: Spiegelfaltung, Bonn

== Publication ==
- Jens Müller (Hrsg.): Rolf Müller – Geschichten, Systeme, Zeichen – Stories, Systems, Marks. Band 7 der Buchreihe A5, Lars Müller Publishers, Zürich 2014, ISBN 978-3037784143.
