= Rick Valicenti =

American graphic designer

- Born: November 20, 1951; Pittsburgh, Pennsylvania
- Education: Bowling Green State University; University of Iowa
- Occupation: Graphic design

Rick Valicenti (born November 20, 1951) is an American graphic designer based in Chicago.

== Early life and education ==
Rick Valicenti was born in 1951 in Pittsburgh, Pennsylvania. He graduated from Bowling Green State University in 1973, and later went on to the University of Iowa to obtain an MA and MFA in Photography in 1975.

== Career ==
Following graduation, Valicenti found the photography scene in Chicago boring, so he worked to create a commercial design portfolio, securing a position at Bruce Beck Design. After Beck retired, he opened his studio, R. Valicenti Design, in 1981. In 1989, looking to change direction of his studio practice, he founded Thirst, a Chicago-based design collaborative devoted to art, function, and authentic human presence. The studio is known for taking risks, and doing conventional jobs unconventionally.

== Service and distinctions ==
Valicenti is a former president of the Society of Typographic Arts and is a member of the Alliance Graphique Internationale since being invited to join in 1996. In 2006, Valicenti won the AIGA Medal for "the passion and intelligence of his influential work, inspiration to his colleagues and mentorship to a generation of students." In 2011, The White House honored Valicenti with the Smithsonian Cooper Hewitt, National Design Award for Communication Design.
