= Kit Hinrichs =

American graphic designer

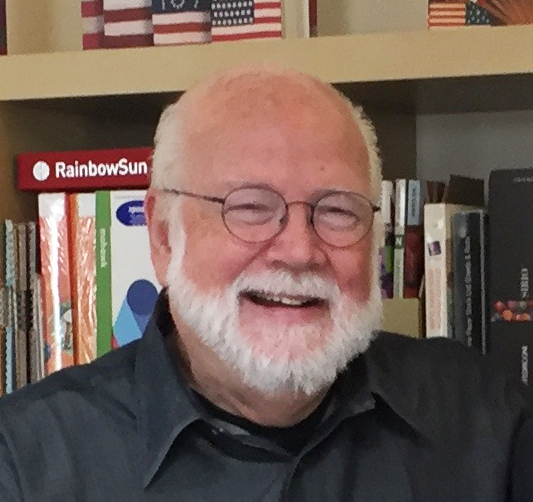
- Hinrichs at Studio Hinrichs, 2016
- Born: November 15, 1941 (age 84); Torrance, California
- Occupation: Graphic designer
- Known for: Pentagram partner, 1986–2009
- Spouse: Linda Hinrichs

Kit Hinrichs (born November 15, 1941) is an American graphic designer, author, collector, and design educator.

== Education ==
Hinrichs studied graphic design at Art Center College of Design (then in Los Angeles, California), where he earned a Bachelor of Professional Arts in 1963.

== Career ==
=== Professional overview ===
After graduating from Art Center in 1963, Hinrichs served in the Marine Corps. Hinrichs then moved to New York and, after a few years, partnered with Anthony Russell to form Russell and Hinrichs, an independent design consultancy. Seven years later, Hinrichs and his wife, Linda Hinrichs, established Hinrichs Design Associates which "focused on reinterpreting the annual report with a concentration on the character of particular companies." They moved to San Francisco in 1976 and formed a bi-coastal partnership with Vance Jonson, B. Martin Pedersen, and Neil Shakery called Jonson, Pedersen, Hinrichs & Shakery. In 1986 the San Francisco office merged with Pentagram and Hinrichs became a partner at Pentagram. Hinrichs was a partner at Pentagram's San Francisco office from 1986 to 2009. In 2009, Hinrichs founded Studio Hinrichs, an independent design firm in San Francisco, California.

Hinrichs' design experience spans brand development and identity, promotion, publication design, packaging design, environmental graphics, product design, editorial design, and exhibition design. Hinrichs' past and present clients include the California Academy of Sciences, Design Within Reach, Crocker Bank, Transamerica, Potlatch Corporation, American President Lines, The Nature Company, Consolidated Freightways, Royal Viking Lines, Clarks of England, Art Center College of Design, Red Herring (magazine), Aspen Skiing Company, Sony Metreon Entertainment Complex, United Airlines' Hemispheres Magazine, Simpson Paper, Sappi Fine Paper, Muzak, Gymboree, University of Southern California, Safeco, Museum of Glass, Symantec, KQED, the San Francisco Zoo, Restoration Hardware, Columbus Salame, and many more.

Hinrichs is the co-author of seven books: Vegetables, Stars & Stripes: Ninety-six Top Designers and Graphic Artists Offer Their Personal Interpretations of Old Glory, TypeWise, Long May She Wave: A Graphic History of the American Flag, The Pentagram Papers: A Collection of Thirty-six Papers, 100 American Flags: A Unique Collection of Old Glory Memorabilia, and 100 Baseball Icons: From the National Baseball Hall of Fame and Museum Archive. He also co-founded @Issue: The Journal of Business and Design with Delphine Hirasuna.

Hinrichs has taught various graphic design courses at School of Visual Arts, California College of the Arts, and Academy of Art University.

=== Visual storytelling ===
Philip B. Meggs and Alston W. Purvis describe Hinrichs as a "visual storyteller" whose "designs are distinguished by a keen understanding of the narrative and abundant interpretations on a theme." According to Hinrichs, "[o]ne thing you'll find is that whether I'm talking or designing, there are always metaphors involved. Parables. Simple stories that anyone can understand. Before I solve the styling—the way in which an idea is going to be presented—I ask 'Who are we talking to, and how can I best tell the story?' That process of telling the story verbally automatically triggers ideas about the way in which I'll tell it visually."

=== @Issue: The Journal of Business Design ===
In or about 1986, Kit Hinrichs and writer Delphine Hirasuna conceived of a magazine to bridge "designers and corporate clients, addressing the ever-present perception that neither party clearly understands what each other contributes to their intended collaboration." In 1994, Potlatch papers agreed to underwrite the project, and in 1995 the Corporate Design Foundation became involved as the official publisher of @Issue: The Journal of Business and Design. @Issue is focused on the "effective use of design in business," and includes case studies, interviews, and articles about client-designer collaborations. @Issue "was immediately embraced by the design and business communities because it was the only publication that really addressed how design directly impacts businesses and their brands." In 2006, @Issue's circulation (available only by subscription) reached 100,000, and a spinoff conference was started. In 2009, @Issue transformed from a printed publication to a digital platform.

== American Flag and Memorabilia Collection ==
Kit Hinrichs collects American flags and American flag memorabilia, and owns thousands of objects that have formed the basis of several exhibitions and books. His collection has been exhibited by the Smithsonian Institution, the Mercer Museum, and the Nevada Museum of Art. Hinrichs made a guest appearance on Martha Stewart's show Martha to discuss and present his American flag and ephemera collection.

Kit Hinrichs has written and/or designed four books about the American flag: Stars & Stripes: Ninety-six Top Designers and Graphic Artists Offer Their Personal Interpretations of Old Glory, Long May She Wave: A Graphic History of the American Flag, 100 American Flags: A Unique Collection of Old Glory Memorabilia, and The American Flag: Two Centuries of Concord and Conflict.

== Awards and recognition ==
Hinrichs has won hundreds of design awards, including the AIGA Medal in 2004 and an honorary Doctorate of Letters by Art Center College of Design in 2009. He is represented in several permanent collections including: the Museum of Modern Art (MoMA) in New York City; the Library of Congress in Washington, DC; and the San Francisco Museum of Modern Art (SFMOMA). He has been a featured speaker at national design conferences including the HOW Design Live Conference, Adobe MAX, the Stanford Design Conference, the AIGA National Conferences, as well as at regional AIGA chapters and at universities and design schools across the country.

Hinrichs is an AIGA fellow, a member of the Alliance Graphique Internationale, and a trustee of Art Center College of Design. He is a former executive board member of the AIGA, and served on the Accessions Design and Architecture committee at the San Francisco Museum of Modern Art. Hinrichs was chair of the AIGA California Show (the first regional show in AIGA's 100-year history), the AIGA Business Conference, and the San Francisco Design Lecture Series; he co-chaired the Alliance Graphique Internationale Congress.

In 2008, Hinrichs mounted a retrospective exhibit at California State University, Sacramento entitled "The Storyteller's Art" which traveled to Art Center College of Design in Pasadena, California in 2009.

== Books ==
- Hinrichs, Kit, and Delphine Hirasuna. Vegetables. San Francisco: Chronicle, 1985. Print. ISBN 0877013616.
- Hinrichs, Kit, and Delphine Hirasuna. Stars & Stripes: Ninety-six Top Designers and Graphic Artists Offer Their Personal Interpretations of Old Glory. San Francisco: Chronicle, 1987. Print. ISBN 158008916X.
- Hinrichs, Kit, and Delphine Hirasuna. TypeWise. Cincinnati, OH: North Light, 1990. Print. ISBN 0891343563.
- Hinrichs, Kit, Delphine Hirasuna, and Terry Heffernan. Long May She Wave: A Graphic History of the American Flag. Berkeley, CA: Ten Speed, 2001. Print. ISBN 1580082408.
- Hinrichs, Kit, and Delphine Hirasuna. The Pentagram Papers: A Collection of Thirty-six Papers ... London: Thames & Hudson, 2006. Print. ISBN 0811855635.
- Hinrichs, Kit, Delphine Hirasuna, and Terry Heffernan. 100 American Flags: A Unique Collection of Old Glory Memorabilia. Berkeley, CA: Ten Speed, 2008. Print. ISBN 1580089208.
- Heffernan, Terry, Kit Hinrichs, and Delphine Hirasuna. 100 Baseball Icons: From the National Baseball Hall of Fame and Museum Archive. Berkeley, CA: Ten Speed, 2008. Print. ISBN 158008916X.

== See also ==
- List of AIGA medalists
- Alliance Graphique Internationale
- Pentagram
- Graphis
