= Henry Steiner =

Austrian logo designer (born 1934)

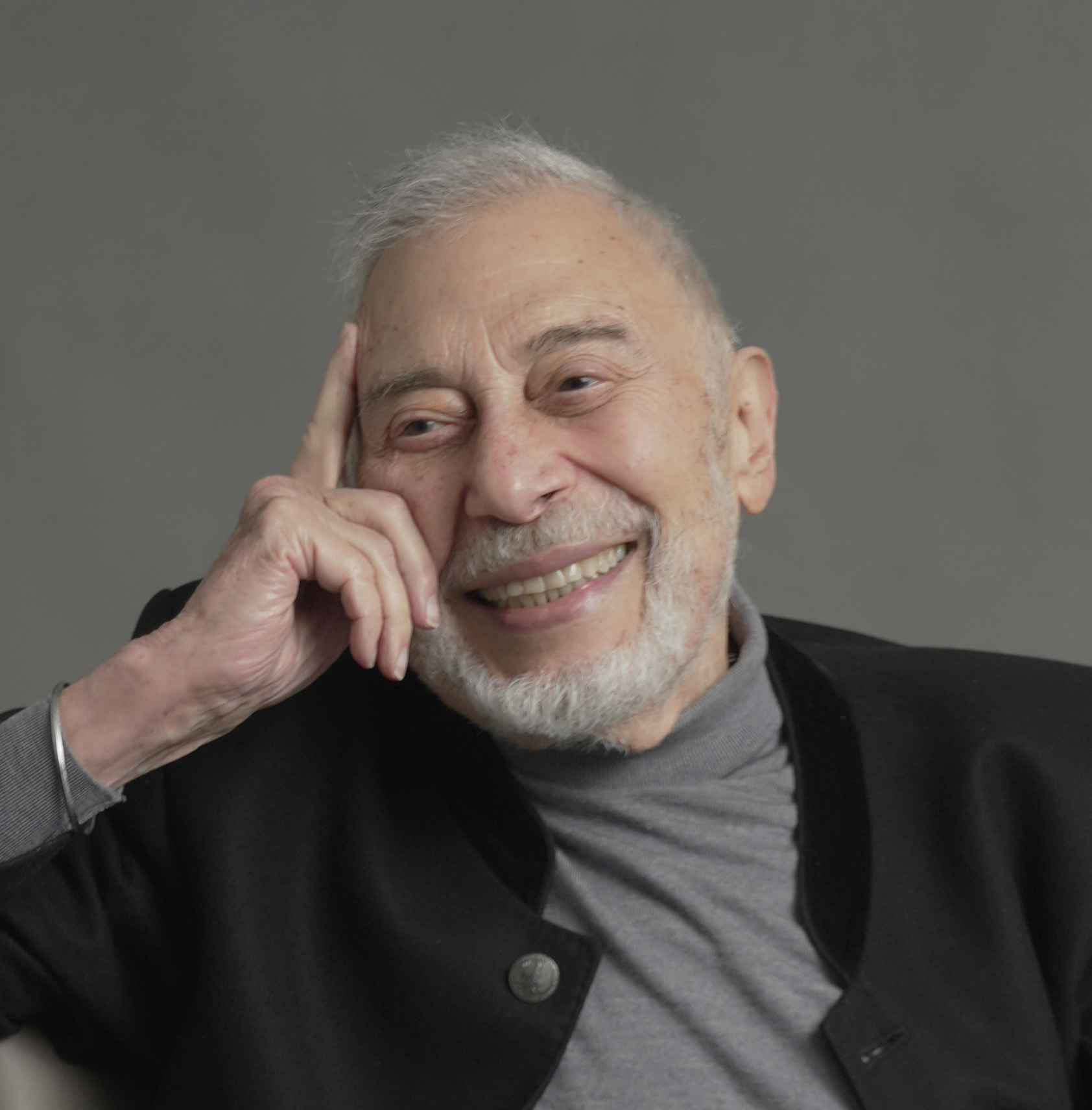
- Steiner in 2023
- Born: 13 February 1934 (age 92); Vienna, Austria
- Education: Hunter College; Yale University; University of Paris
- Occupation: Graphic designer

Chinese name
- Chinese: 石漢瑞
Transcriptions
Yue: Cantonese
- Jyutping: sek6 hon3 soei6
- Website: steiner.hk

Henry Steiner FCSD (Chinese: 石漢瑞; born Hans Steiner; 13 February 1934) is an Austrian graphic designer, known as the "Father of Hong Kong Graphic Design" – a moniker gained for his graphic designs that have shaped Hong Kong's visual landscape. Best known for creating branding for many renowned Hong Kong–based companies, most notably the iconic HSBC logo. Henry has also designed identities for various institutions, ranging from hospitality groups to media outlets. These include Standard Chartered, Unilever, Hongkong Land, Dairy Farm, IBM, and The Hong Kong Jockey Club – many still in use today.

In Steiner's book, Graphic Communications: Essay on Design he commented on his outsider status saying, "Ultimately, it is the context of a design which makes it cross-cultural and this is determined by the designer's attitude. You don't have to be an outsider but it helps. Perhaps a French designer, for example, could consciously and objectively communicate something about basic Frenchness to his compatriots but he would first need to be alienated in some way – as are most artists".

Steiner was included in Icograda's list of the Masters of the 20th Century in 2002, and was named a World Master by Idea magazine.

== Biography ==
Steiner was born into an Austrian Jewish family as Hans Steiner. His parents, a dentist practising in Baden bei Wien and a seamstress, enjoyed "a nice bourgeois life" until the Anschluss in 1938. After many failed attempts to flee the country, his mother turned to help from a Hollywood film producer, Julius Stoeger, who agreed to assist in their escape. When the family arrived in New York City in 1939, an immigration officer changed Hans to Henry, since the former sounded "too German". Steiner studied at Stuyvesant High School and then Hunter College, where he decided to turn his deep interest in science fiction into a career in graphic design. He received a Master's degree in graphic design at Yale University, studying under Paul Rand and won a Fulbright Fellowship in 1958 to further his studies at the Sorbonne in Paris, France. He then returned to New York City and worked as design director for The Asia Magazine.

In 1961, Steiner signed a nine-month contract for the magazine's launch in Hong Kong. Steiner did not return to New York but founded his own consultancy firm, Steiner&Co (Graphic Communications Limited) and settled in the city which he continues to contribute to the graphic design of till this day. "Working in Hong Kong has provided me with a living visual vocabulary which would have been inaccessible and inappropriate in New York."

== Selected designs ==
=== HSBC ===
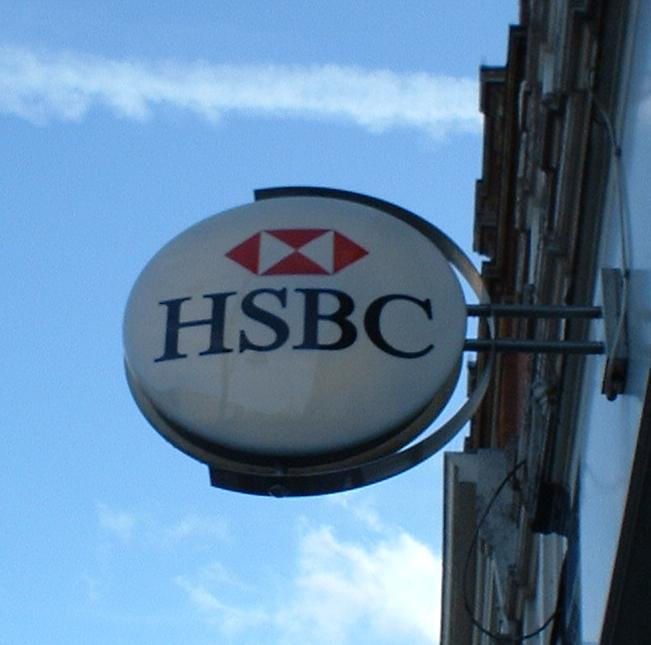
HSBC sign on a branch.

Perhaps the most renowned of Steiner's contributions to corporate identities is the world renowned logo designed for The Hongkong and Shanghai Banking Corporation. Steiner developed the identity in 1984, based on the St. Andrew's cross, alluding to the Scottish heritage of the bank's founder.

=== Standard Chartered Bank ===
Henry Steiner designed the Hong Kong banknote for the Standard Chartered Bank. He noted that banknotes of the city had the rare practice of not featuring portraits, therefore he incorporated mythical Chinese creatures in his designs on the obverse side – the notes appeared in five denominations and showcased a hierarchy of aquatic, amphibious, terrestrial and celestial creatures. In 2003, Henry Steiner updated the designs incorporating the latest anti-counterfeiting technology, with the reverse featuring Hong Kong's dynamic harbour from various time periods. In 2010s, he was commissioned for the last time to design banknotes which featured Chinese traditional and modern technology. He also designed an unprecedented 150-dollar commemorative banknote for the bank's 150th anniversary in 2009, which featured the Standard Chartered Bank Building and a group of people representing Hong Kong's history watching over the coasts of Victoria Harbour.

=== Hong Kong Jockey Club ===
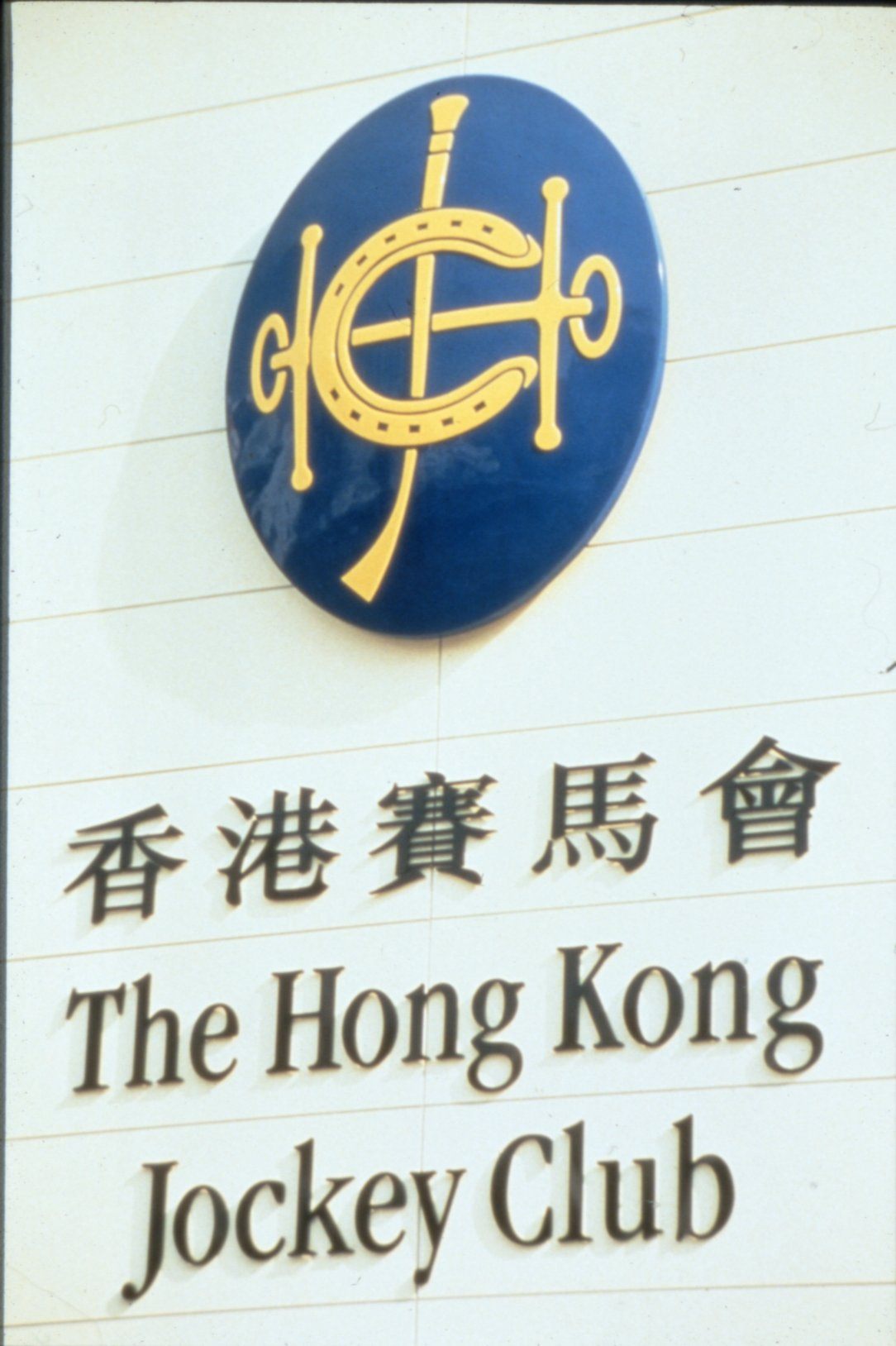
Hong Kong Jockey Club Logo on Plaque at Happy Valley Racecourse

In anticipation of the handover of Hong Kong in 1997, the Royal Hong Kong Jockey Club voted to change its colonial name. Steiner took this opportunity to re-evaluate their applied mark. Rather than change it completely, he chose to revitalize the familiar monogram and reinforcing more than a century of brand equity. The familiar whip, horseshoe, and bridle initials were redesigned and placed within a striking new blue and yellow oval. This branding overhaul, reinvigorating a great tradition, was widely embraced by members and the public.

=== Hongkong Land ===
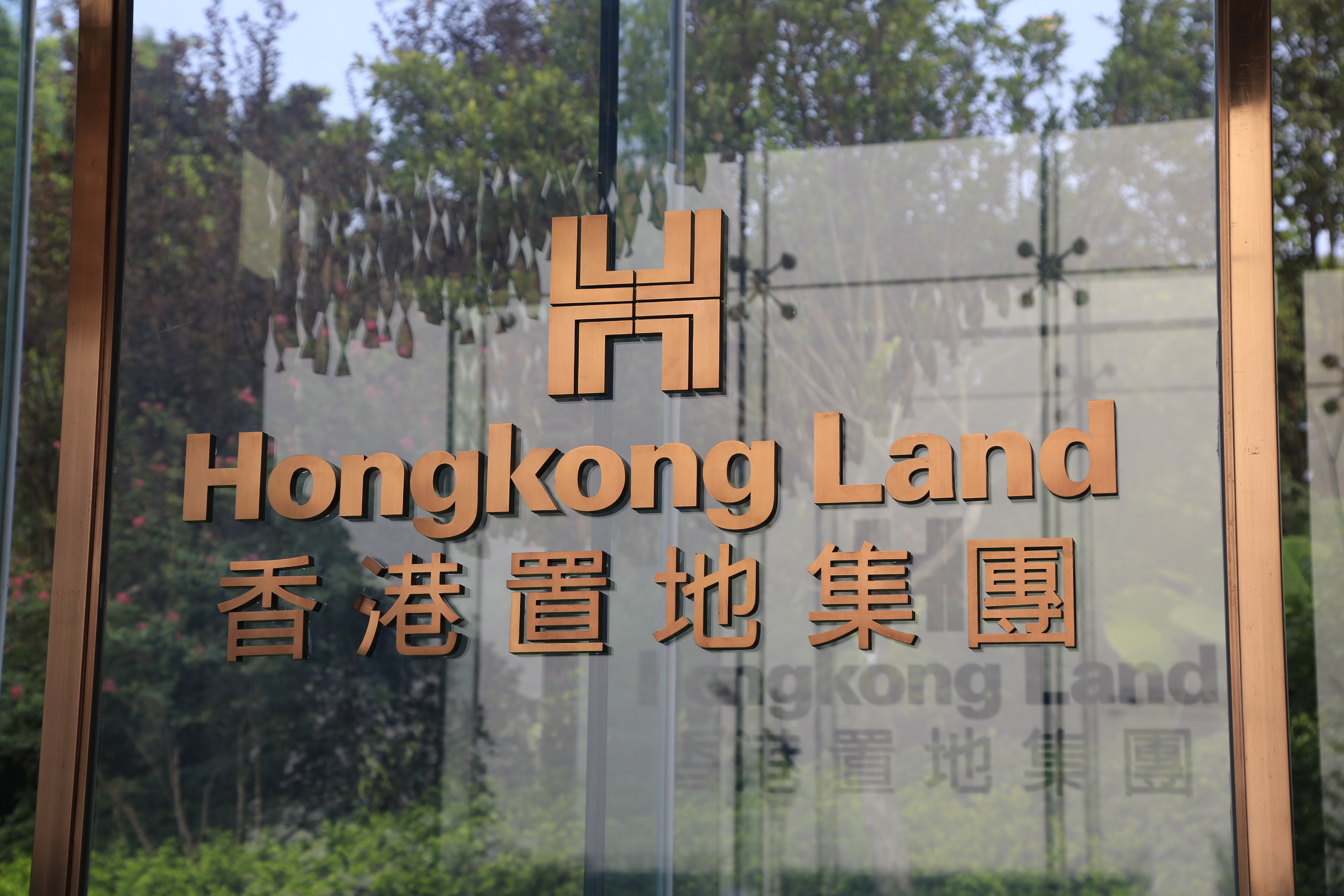
Hongkong Land Logo outside main building.

Established as The Hongkong Land Investment and Agency Co. Ltd. in 1889, Hong Kong's premier developer and landlord needed to refresh its image in an increasingly crowded market. It faced the challenge of communicating its enduring status in an up-to-date way. Steiner shortened the brand name to "Hongkong Land" and devised an H mark combining the Chinese character for "longevity" with a floor plan. This design was one of the first in which Henry demonstrated his signature cross-cultural design style – the conscious incorporation of elements of Chinese vocabulary into his work.

== Recognition ==
=== Honours ===
- President of Alliance Graphique Internationale
- Fellow of the Chartered Society of Designers
- Fellow of the Hong Kong Designers Association
- Honorary member of Design Austria
- Fellow of the American Institute of Graphic Arts
- Member of the New York Art Directors Club
- Awarded an honorary Doctorate by Hong Kong Baptist University
- Awarded the Hong Kong Print Outstanding Achievement Award
- Awarded the Asia-Europe Foundation Logo Award
- Awarded the Golden Decoration of Honour of the Republic of Austria for design achievement and service to the Austrian community
- Honorary professor at the University of Hong Kong's School of Architecture
- Honorary professor at the Hong Kong Polytechnic University's School of Design
- Honorary Doctorate, Academy of Art University, San Francisco
- Named Hong Kong Designer of the Year (1990) by Hong Kong Artists' Guild
- Named a World Master by Japan's Idea magazine
- Included in Masters of the 20th Century by Icograda
- Cited as one of the 100 most important people affecting Hong Kong's development since 1841 by Next Magazine

=== Awards ===
- Outstanding Entries, Fourth Asian Advertising Congress, Hong Kong (1964)
- Award of Excellence, Typomundus 20 (1966)
- Excellence, The Mead Library of Ideas, Annual Report Shows, United States (1969 to 1985)
- Creative Awards, Asian Advertising Congress (1968 to 1974)
- Governor's Award for Hong Kong Design (1970)
- First Prize, Seventh Asian Advertising Congress, New Delhi (1970)
- Bronze Medal, Biennale des Arts Graphique, Brno, Czechoslovakia (1972)
- Award, International Poster Biennale, Warsaw (1972, 1976)
- Outstanding Packaging Award, Hong Kong Packaging Council (1973)
- First Prize, Festival of Hong Kong Stamp Exhibition (1973)
- Asiastar Packaging Award, The Asian Packaging Federation (1974)
- First Prize, Financial Advertising, The Times, London (1974)
- Award of Excellence, Communication Arts, United States (1974 to 1992)
- Gold, Bronze, Silver Awards, Hongkong Designers Association (1975 to 1999)
- Design Excellence, Print Casebooks (1975 to 1978)
- The One Show Merit Award, The Art Directors Club, New York (1976)
- Merit Award, Hong Kong Packaging Council (1976)
- Merit Awards, The New York Art Directors Club (1976, 1990)
- Awards, Asian Graphic Design Biennale, Tehran (1978)
- Awards of Excellence, Society of Typographic Arts United States (1978 to 1980)
- Typographic Excellence, Type Directors Club, New York (1979 to 1988)
- Silver Award, Association of Accredited Advertising Agents, Hong Kong (1983, 1984)
- Bronze Medal, Book Art Biennale, Brno, Czechoslovakia (1984)
- Gold Award, TTF Paper Creative Award, Hong Kong (1988)
- Excellence, The Best of International Self-Promotion, Australia (1989)
- Designer of the Year, Hong Kong Artists' Guild (1990)
- Silver Award, Annual Report, Hong Kong Print Awards (1990)
- Sponsor's Award, The 33rd All-Japan Poster Exhibition (1991)
- Awards of Excellence, The Best of International Self-Promotion, United States (1993)
- 'Best in Business Publication' Award, Chartered Society of Hong Kong (1995)
- Premier Award, std International TypoGraphic Awards, England (1998)
- Gold Award, Hong Kong Designers Associations (2000)
- Golden Decoration of Honour of the Republic of Austria (2006)

== Exhibitions ==
- Henry Steiner: The Art of Graphic Communication, Solo exhibition at M+ Museum, Hong Kong (15 June – 10 November 2024)
- LOOK: The Graphic Language of Henry Steiner, exhibition at Hong Kong Design Institute, Hong Kong (1 March – 3 May 2021)
- Henry Steiner: Graphic Communicator, Solo exhibition at Design Society, Shenzhen (20 April – 20 June 2019)
- Group Exhibition at AGI Paris, Vienna (2017)
- Persistence of Vision, exhibition at Hong Kong Baptist University, Hong Kong (6 – 13 November 2004)
- MA Graphic Design Graduation Exhibition at Yale University, Connecticut (1957)
- BA Painting Graduation Exhibition at Hunter College, New York (1955)

== Bibliography ==
- Steiner, Henry; Haas, Ken (October 1994). Cross-Cultural Design: Communicating in the Global Marketplace. Van Nostrand Reinhold. ISBN 0-442-00407-9.
- Steiner, Henry (1999). Designer's Life: Henry Steiner. Beijing, China: Wang Xu – China Youth Press.
- Steiner, Henry (2021). Graphic Communications: Essays on Design. Hong Kong: Rennie's Mill Press.
- He, Jianping (2019). 石汉瑞：启蒙者 [Henry Steiner: Graphic Communicator]. China: Design Society.
- Steiner, Henry (June 2024). Corporate Identities: Selected by Henry Steiner. Graphic Communication Limited. ISBN 9789887063704.
