= Catherine Zask =

French graphic designer, typographer and artist (born 1961)

Catherine Zask (born 1961) is a French graphic designer, typographer and artist.

== Biography ==
Zask was born in Paris, where she graduated from the ESAG in 1984. She started her career as an independent designer in 1985.

Since 1985, Zask simultaneously works for commissioned and self initiated projects, using sometimes the letter as a means. She created Alfabetempo in 1993–1994, during her residency at the Villa Medici, French Academy in Rome. This work continues the research she began ten years earlier on letter, tracing and sign. Alfabetempo, Alcibiade, Gribouillis (Doodles), Radiographies de pensées (X-rays of thoughts), Sismozask, Cousu-Zask, The Iris Project, Happy Dots, Splashs... are works she is currently working on, mixing writing, drawings, movies, photos.

She taught at the École de Communication Visuelle (1989–1990), and at the École d'Art de Besançon (1992–1993), gives lectures and participates in juries in France and abroad.

Her work for the University of Franche-Comté was shown at the Centre Pompidou in 1991. Solo exhibitions took place at the Galerie Anatome, Paris in 2004; at the Museum für Gestaltung, Zürich in 2005; at Artazart, Paris, at the Design Centre of the Czech Republic, Brno in 2006, Prague in 2007.

Zask has won several awards, including the Grand Prix at the 20th International Biennial of Graphic Design, Brno, 2002. She is member of the Alliance Graphique Internationale.

== Exhibitions ==
=== Solo exhibitions ===
- 2007: "CZ in CZ", Design Centre of the Czech Republic, Prague
- 2006: Design Centre of the Czech Republic, Brno
- 2006: "Kaléidozask", Artazart, Paris
- 2006: "9 saisons d'affiches", L'Hippodrome scène nationale de Douai
- 2005: Museum für Gestaltung Zürich – curator Félix Studinka
- 2004: "Zask's the Question", Galerie Anatome, Paris
- 1991: "L'identité visuelle de l'université de Franche-Comté", École d'art de Besançon
- 1991: showcase in bookstore la Hune, Paris
- 1991: Salon Exempla'91 – Schrift-Satz-Buch-Druck, Munich
- 1991: "La commande publique", six années de création graphique pour l'université de Franche-Comté, CCI, Centre Georges Pompidou, Paris
- 1988: Galerie Equinox, Paris

=== Collective exhibitions ===
Catherine Zask worldwide participated to many collective exhibitions:

- Europe: France, Germany, United Kingdom, Switzerland, Finland, Czech Republic, Croatia, Russia
- Japan, China, India, South Korea, Iran, USA

== Collections ==
- Sammlung Grafikdesign, Staatliche Museen zu Berlin, Kunstbibliothek
- Bibliothèque nationale de France, Paris
- Lahti Art Museum, Finland
- Les Silos, Maison du livre et de l'affiche, Chaumont
- Moravian Gallery in Brno, Czech Republic
- L'Addresse Musée de La Poste, Paris
- Musée de la Publicité, Palais du Louvre, Paris
- Museum für Gestaltung, Zürich
- Museum of Modern Art, Toyama, Japan
- PAN Plakatsammlung im Kunstforum Niederrhein, Emmerich, Germany
- Tehran Museum of Contemporary Art, Iran

== Awards ==
- 2010: chevalier de l'Ordre des Arts et des Lettres, July 2010
- 2006: poster contest winner "Concert Sauvage" set up by Die Neue Sammlung State Museum of Applied Arts and Design, Munich
- 2006: Golden Bee Award – 7th Golden Bee biennial, Moscow
- 2004: Golden Bee Award – 6th Golden Bee biennial, Moscow
- 2003: special jury award at First China International Poster Biennial
- 2002: Grand Prix – 20th Brno international graphic design biennial, Czech Republic
- 2001: reward from Fiacre for "Radiographies de pensées”
- 1997: member of l'AGI (Alliance graphique internationale)
- 1996: winner of the Third Crane European Letterhead Competition
- 1993–1994: resident at the Villa Medici (Académie de France à Rome)
- 1989: Dragon d'or of the ESAG
- 1988: Typography Excellence Award at type directors Club, New York

== Bibliography ==
- Poster Collection 12 – Catherine Zask, Museum of Design Zurich and Lars Müller Publishers, with essays by Henri Gaudin and Catherine de Smet, ISBN 978-3-03778-054-1
