= Pablo Martín (graphic designer) =

Graphic designer

Pablo Martín (born Pablo Martín Badosa, 1964 in Barcelona) is a creative director and graphic designer who is known for producing brand identities, typography, signage and packaging and for his contribution to newspaper and magazine design.

== Careers ==
Martín was born in Barcelona, Spain, and studied graphic design at the EINA School of Design”.

He began his career working at Mario Eskenazi’s studio in Barcelona and then with Michael Bierut and Massimo Vignelli at Vignelli Associates in New York. In 1993 he founded Grafica with Fernando Gutiérrez, and worked with Camper, Metalarte, Phaidon Press and Canal Sur, plus newspapers and magazines including La Vanguardia and Tentaciones, the Friday supplement for El País. After Gutiérrez’s departure for Pentagram in 2000, Martín continued to run Grafica for thirteen more years.

In 2012 he co-founded the brand and design consultancy Atlas with Astrid Stavro based in Palma, Mallorca, and oversaw the award-winning redesign of Elephant magazine in 2014. Atlas also received awards for his work on the Barcelona Design Museum. By 2016 Atlas had reportedly become the most awarded design agency in Spain.

In 2000 Martín was elected as a member of the Alliance Graphique Internationale (AGI), an organisation of graphic artists and designers. Martin previously held the position of President of AGI Spain.

Martín won the Spanish National Design and Innovation Award with the jury calling him "one of the greatest influences in the panorama of contemporary Spanish graphic design".

In 2019 Martín joined Efe Cakarel at MUBI as Creative Director, running a team of video editors and designers to develop a broad variety of assets: trailers, posters, and brand campaigns. In 2022 that he launched the printed publication 'Notebook'.

Martín has also judged and chaired various design competitions including Design and Art Direction (D&AD), SPD and the Art Directors Club of New York.
