= Tomoko Miho =

Japanese-American graphic designer (1931–2012)

- Born: September 2, 1931; Los Angeles, California, U.S.
- Died: February 10, 2012 (aged 80); New York City, New York, U.S.
- Occupation: Graphic Designer

Tomoko Miho (September 2, 1931 - February 10, 2012) was a Japanese-American graphic designer and recipient of the 1993 AIGA Medal. She is known for her understanding of the relationship between space and object.

== Biography ==
Tomoko Miho (née Kawakami) was born in Los Angeles in 1931 and spent her early days in the Gila River War Relocation Center in Arizona.

She attended the Minneapolis School of Art and the Art Center School in Los Angeles where she earned a degree in industrial design. She and her husband and fellow designer, James Miho, went traveling through Europe where she met Giovanni Pintori (director of Olivetti), Hans Erni, and Herbert Leupin, and visited the renowned Ulm School of Design. After her return to the United States, she worked at George Nelson Associates, Inc. under Creative Director Irving Harper and became his successor. She worked for Herman Miller furniture and the Center for Advanced Research in Design (for Container Corporation of America and Atlantic Richfield Company). In the 1980s she founded her own studio, Tomoko Miho & Co. Her clients included MoMA, Smithsonian Institution, National Air and Space Museum, Isamu Noguchi Foundation, Goulandris Museum of Cycladic Art in Athens, Willem de Kooning Foundation, Kodansha International, and Aveda.

Miho is noted for her contribution in the form of architectural posters in New York and Chicago. Today, they are in the Museum of Modern Art, at the Library of Congress, and at Cooper Hewitt, and were published in design magazines like Novum Gebrauchsgraphik. Her work is strongly influenced by Swiss international typographic style. Her architecturally infused works were honored with numerous prizes and have been featured in international exhibitions. In 2013, the Swedish Hall of Femmes project published a book focused on Miho, Hall of Femmes: Tomoko Miho. In 2023 Eye magazine featured a full length article examining her work, "The Quiet Confidence of Tomoko Miho."
