= John Bielenberg =

American designer

John Bielenberg is an American designer classified as an entrepreneur and a design thinker. He is recognized for innovative investigations into the practice and understanding of design and leadership in the “design for good” movement. He is also credited with creating the Blitz Cycle for design in hard to improve areas.

== Early life ==
Bielenberg was born in 1957 in Regensburg, Germany.

== Work ==
Bielenberg collaborated with Alex Bogusky and Ana Bogusky and Rob Schuham in 2010 to form COMMON, a brand that supports, connects and celebrates those designing for a new era of socially minded enterprise. Most recently, he partnered with Greg Galle to launch a firm called Future, which engages with organizations, institutions and companies to unlock the potential of human ingenuity.

In 2003, Bielenberg created Project M, an immersive program designed to inspire and educate young designers, writers, photographers and filmmakers by proving that their work can have a significant impact on communities. Project M has developed projects in Alabama, Baltimore, Connecticut, Costa Rica, Detroit, Germany, Ghana, Iceland, Maine, Minneapolis and New Orleans.
