= Bruno Monguzzi =

Swiss graphic designer (born 1941)

Bruno Monguzzi (born 1941) is a Swiss graphic designer.

Monguzzi was born in Mendrisio, Switzerland in 1941. He later moved to Geneva with his family and attended the Graphic Design Course at the École des Arts Décoratifs.

In 1960, he travelled to London and attended Gestalt psychology, typography and photography courses at Saint Martin's School of Art and the London College of Printing (now the London College of Communication).

After working with Dennis Bailey in London he moved to Milan in 1961 to join the Studio Boggeri – at the time the leading design and advertising agency in Italy. In 1965, he was called to join the Charles Gagnon and James Volkus office in Montreal, to design nine pavilions for Expo 67.

From the early seventies, he worked independently from his atelier in Meride, a secluded village in the South of Switzerland.

He received the Premio Bodoni in 1971, the Gold Medal from the New York Art Directors Club in 1990, the Yusaku Kamekura Award and the gold medal at the Toyama Biennial in 2000.

In 2003, he was awarded the distinction Honorary Royal Designer for Industry (by the Royal Society of Arts, London).

Amongst his most significant projects: the visual identity of the Musée d'Orsay in Paris (no longer in use), the exhibition "Majakowskij Mejerchold Stanislavskij" at Castello Sforzesco in Milan, and the posters for Museo Cantonale d'Arte in Lugano (1987-2004).

== Sources ==
- Lo Studio Boggeri 1933-1981 (Electa)
- Bruno Monguzzi: A Designers's Perspectives (University of Maryland, ISSN 1521-1223)
- Eye Magazine, Issue 1, Title of article: Reputations: Bruno Monguzzi by Valentina Boffa
- Bruno Monguzzi on the AGI website (Alliance Graphique Internationale)
