= Rosmarie Tissi =

Swiss graphic designer

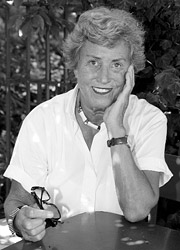
Portrait of Rosmarie Tissi

Rosmarie Tissi (born 1937) is a Swiss graphic designer known for her poster designs.

== Education ==
Tissi first studied at Kunstgewerbeschule Zürich (School of Arts and Crafts) in 1953. She left the school after one year to do a four-year apprenticeship with designer Siegfried Odermatt. Tissi was hired by Odermatt in 1958. In 1968, the two established a partnership as a studio under the name Odermatt & Tissi. They designed printed matter, posters, and typefaces.

Tissi has received numerous awards including first prize and gold medal at the 11th International Poster Biennial in Warsaw 1986, second prize for her design of Swiss banknotes in 1989, and a Swiss Grand Award for Design in 2018.

She also taught at the Rhode Island School of Design and Yale University.

== Work ==
Tissi's work was published in the first issue of Neue Grafik magazine in 1957. When she completed her studies in 1958, Swiss designers such as Max Bill, Ernst Keller, Josef Muller-Brockmann were very popular. Tissi's work first exemplified Swiss Modernism but evolved to a unique post-modern style. Hall of Femmes calls her a "reformer" of the Swiss School style.

Tissi's designs are characterised by bright colors, geometric shapes, and playfulness. Her work includes posters, banknotes, logos, textbooks and typefaces. She is also well known for her posters.

Tissi lives and works in Zurich.
