= Erik Nitsche =

American graphic designer

- Nitsche in an undated photo
- Born: September 7, 1908; Lausanne, Switzerland
- Died: November 10, 1998 (aged 90); Danbury, Connecticut
- Education: Kunstgewerbeschule

Erik Nitsche (September 7, 1908 – November 10, 1998) was a pioneer in the design of books, annual reports, and other printed material. His works focused on attention to the details of page composition and simple type presentation. His hallmarks were clear design, brilliant colors, smart typography, and an adherence to particular geometric foundations.

== Biography ==
Erik Nitsche was born in Lausanne, Switzerland on September 7, 1908, and studied at the Collège Classique of Lausanne and the Kunstgewerbeschule in Munich. Nitsche went to school at Kunstgewerbeschule, a University in Munich. After this, he got a job in Cologne before moving to Paris to pursue his art career. While there, Nitsche combined Bauhaus and rational together, which influenced many of his earlier pieces. To avoid the conflict that was escalating in Europe, he fled to the United States. After immigrating to the United States, he became a designer for Simplicissimus, Jugend, and Der Querschnitt, creating covers and illustrations. He moved to the United States in 1934, where he worked in Hollywood before moving to New York in 1936. There, he worked for major magazines including Life, Vanity Fair, and Harper’s Bazaar as well as advertising and promotional campaigns for Twentieth Century Fox and Universal.

In 1955, Nitsche began working with the engineering company General Dynamics as art director, which he held until 1960. There, he designed a breakthrough series of posters, as well as constructing their corporate image, annual reports, and advertising through the development of information design systems. Nitsche designed a 420-page book on the company's history entitled Dynamic America, prompting him to begin designing his own books.

Nitsche was also a consultant to the Museum of Modern Art's Department of Design and to Standard Oil of New Jersey in the 1950s and 60s. During this time, he designed award-winning advertisements for Container Corporation of America.

In the early 1960s, Nitsche moved to Geneva where he established ENI, S.A. (Erik Nitsche International) and designed two encyclopedias: the twelve volume The New Illustrated Library of Science and Invention and the twenty volume The History of Music. ENI folded after Nitsche's former partner established a similar company designing similar books, leaving him in debt. 1965 to 1980, Nitsche lived in Paris where he produced over 2,000 color illustrations for the five-volume encyclopedia, L’Épopée Nationale d’un Siècle, which covered 100 years of science and technology.

In 1981, he moved back to Munich, returning to the US in 1996. Nitsche died on November 10, 1998, in Danbury, Connecticut.

== General Dynamics Posters – history and influence ==
In the span of Nitsche's tenure with General Dynamics (1955–1960), Nitsche's main goal was to help shift the narrative around atomic energy from one of bombs and destruction to one of peace and scientific advancement.

His first series of posters was created for exhibition at the International Conference on the Peaceful Uses of Atomic Energy, which was held in Geneva, Switzerland in 1955. There was a lot riding on the design of these images; General Dynamics wanted to both elevate its image as a defense supplier but also outshine its competitors present at the conference. General Electric, Union Carbide, and Westinghouse were all in attendance and better known to the public.

Nitsche created this campaign with some very important and effective design elements; clean and pared down compositions helped create a modern look, and he created the posters in several languages. English, French, Japanese, Hindi, Russian, and German were all used in the campaign; poignantly chosen to highlight the nations that were committed at the time to developing atomic energy for peaceful purposes. Typography was treated as a design element, its simplicity lending to the overall clean, modern, and positive look of the campaign. He borrowed heavily from the Modern Art movement to evoke dynamism and innovation. Nitsche was barred from depicting specific General Dynamics products - in many cases these top secret defense ships and weapons were not even shown or shared with the artist. This limitation pushed Nitsche to lean into abstraction, and he ended up creating one of the most important corporate advertising campaigns of the Twentieth Century.

Atoms for Peace, as this original series was coined, was a massive success and was continued by Nitsche throughout his tenure at General Dynamics. His artful portrayal of what was essentially a weapons company as a calming, forward-thinking peaceful movement heralded the Atomic Age. The design elements in these posters were co-opted by countless other companies and designers to create a style that for many encapsulates mid-1950s America. Clocks, dishes, even cities like Las Vegas were influenced by Erik Nitsche's innovative designs for General Dynamics.
