= Francis Bernard (artist) =

French painter

Francis Bernard (born 1928 in Paris) is a painter, a multimedia artist and the author of textimages.

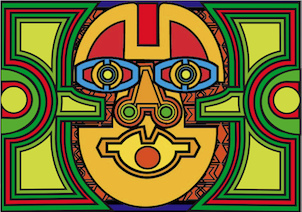
serie of masks:.

== Exhibitions ==
In 1974, Francis Bernard exhibited work at the Swedish Cultural Center in Paris: a polychromatic sculpture on the occasion of an exhibition of works from the Salvador Allende Museum in Santiago, Chile.

A few years later, Francis Bernard undertook a graphic transcription of "AMERICA", a poem by Michèle Lalonde from Quebec. Presented on billboards, this work was shown in Montreal, as well as in the Musée du Luxembourg in Paris in December 1980.

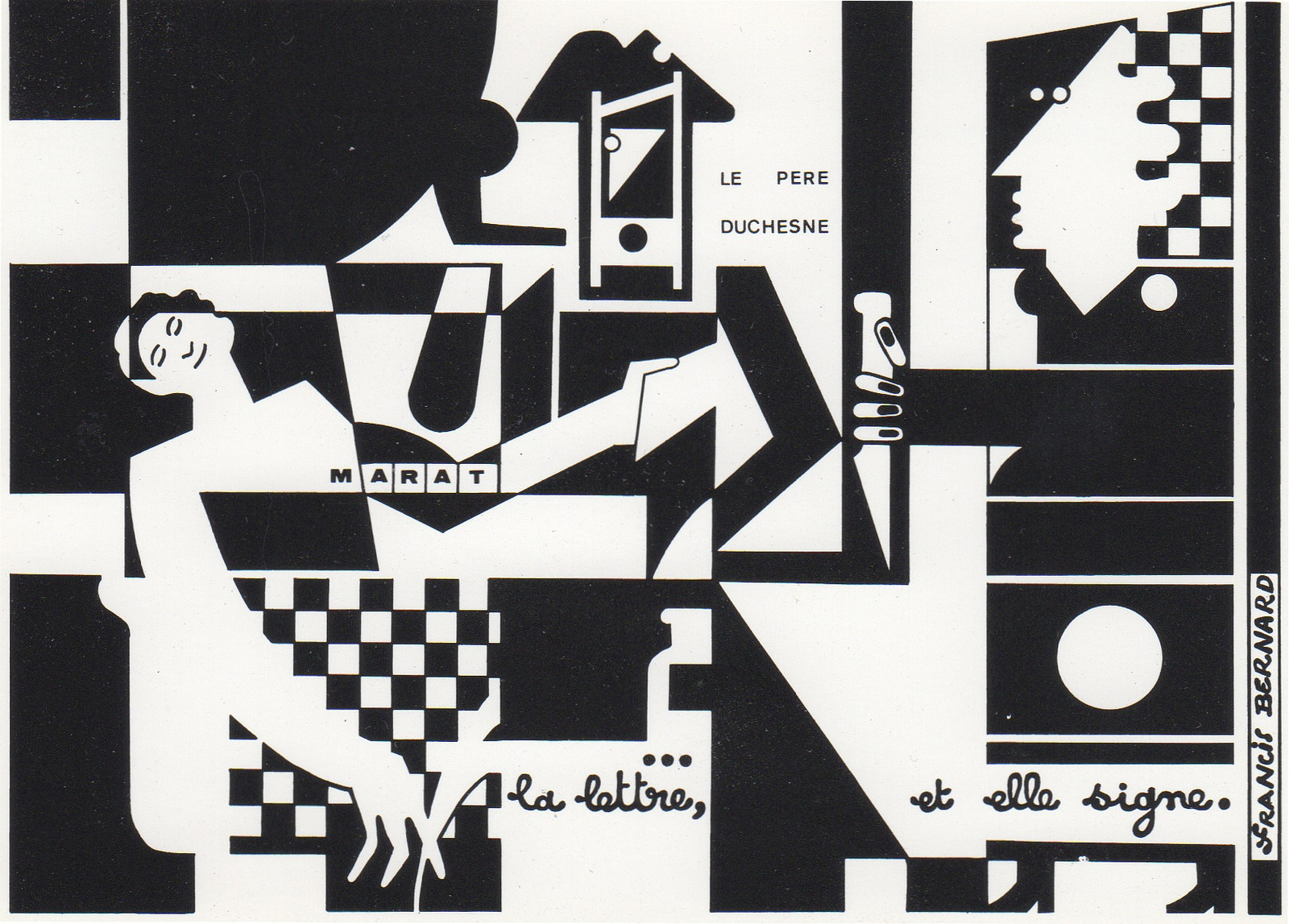
A drawing of the series "Père Duchesne"

In 1981, Francis Bernard created a graphic series based on the character Père Duchesne. This was shown for two months at the Centre Pompidou in Paris. The series is a collection of 150 drawings and paintings and constitutes the "Théâtre pictural du Père Duchesne". It was inspired by the Jean-Pierre Faye play, Les dernières journées du père Duchesne, which uses historical material from the revolutionary newspaper Le Père Duchesne. Twenty two panels of this series were also presented at the French-Italian Cultural Center, during the biennial Venice carnival on the theme "The masks of Marat".

In 1984, in the hall of the Criée Theater in Marseille, Bernard exhibited a series of images painted on the theme of the French Revolution in the style of the Épinal print.

Francis Bernard has also exhibited elsewhere widely: the Cultural center, Nanterre; the École normale supérieure, Cachan; La Rochelle; Brussels; Montreal, etc.).

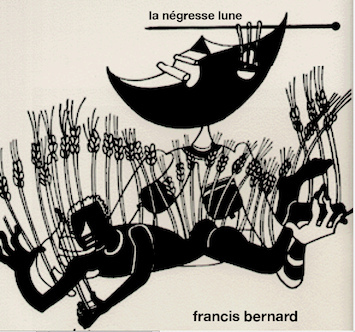
An illustration of La Négresse Lune

== Cartoon movies and graphic videos ==
In parallel to the graphic series on Père Duchesne, Francis Bernard also creates a graphic video. Filmed in 1981 in the video studio of Beaubourg, it will be shown during the biennial Venice carnival and in the large hall of the Centre Pompidou.

In Venice he makes the cartoon movie « Les Pupi Siciliennes ». The characters are wooden puppets who tell the story of Charlemagne upon his return from the Crusades. The musical score for the film is composed by Enzo d’Alò director of the studio La Lanterna Magica. In 1979, with Enzo D’Alò Bernard makes the film « Pupinocchio » in the studio La Lanterna Magica, Turin. This is a graphic fantasy combining the characters of Pinocchio and the Pupi siciliennes.

Francis Bernard is also author of the play entitled « Attentat à la peinture » first performed in Brussels in the Halles de Schaerbeek/Hallen van Schaarbeek and then in Turin, Genoa and Milan. Parts of the play were also performed in the Théâtre du Rond-Point in Paris which Jean-Louis Barrault and Madeleine Renaud were the directors-organizers. Ahmed Ben Diab, visual artist and musician composed the score.

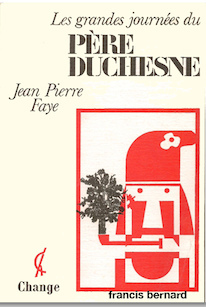
Cover of the review Change

== Illustrations and books' covers ==
In 1980, Francis Bernard illustrated books by Michèle Lalonde that were published for a celebration of the 14th of July organised by the town of La Rochelle. These included Métaphore pour un nouveau monde.

In 1986, Francis Bernard illustrated a Moroccan tale, entitled La Négresse Lune in collaboration with Bénédicte Vilgrain. The full-page compositions are in black and in color. In the same year, he illustrated several texts of poetry including « Narration du déluge » written by Abdellatif Laâbi and published by Arcantère (1986). The illustrations were also exhibited at the Castel of Fougères.

Bernard also contributed to the review CHANGE founded and animated by Jean-Pierre Faye who operated the typesetting of the review published by Robert Laffont.

Between 1983-1987, Francis Bernard typeset the cover of several works from the series « Théorie pratique pédagogie » published by Pratiques. Since 2009, he has produced the dummies of books published by Jean-François Chanlat, professor at the University Paris-Dauphine for the éditions of Montréal.
