= The History of Graphic Design =

- Volume I published in 2017. Volume I covers the years 1890–1959.
- Author: Jens Müller
- Genre: History
- Publisher: Taschen
- Publication date: 2017–2018
- Publication place: Germany
- Pages: 900

The History of Graphic Design is a two-volume series on the history of graphic design written by Jens Müller and edited by Julius Wiedemann. The first volume originally published in 2017, deals with the history of graphic design from 1890 to 1959. The second volume, published in 2018, covers from 1960 to the late 2010s. The series was published in English, French, and German.

== Synopsis ==
The History of Graphic Design outlines the development of graphic design as a field and explores cultural history from the late 19th through the early 21st Century through the lens of graphic design. The evolution of graphic design from posters and advertising to logos, magazine design and corporate identity. The books include thousands of the most seminal works and designs in the field, as well as biographies of some of the most influential graphic designers. Chapters are arranged in chronological order, and are illustrated by visual timelines which provide cultural and historical context for seminal graphic designs.

=== Volume 1, 1890–1959 ===
The History of Graphic Design, Volume 1 explores the development of graphic design from the end of the 19th Century to the end of the 1950s. It covers historically significant design styles like Futurism and the New Typography, and includes biographies of designers such as Henry van de Velde, Karel Teige, and James Pryde and William Nicholson.

=== Volume 2, 1960–Today ===
The History of Graphic Design, Volume 2 covers the history of graphic design from the mid-19th Century to the late 2010s. It pays special attention to the revolutions in design during the 1960s and 1970s, and the rising importance of digital technology to graphic design from the 1990s onwards.

== Reception ==
The book was mostly well received by critics, and is considered an essential reading on the history of graphic design. Katy Cowan of Creative Boom described the book as "the most comprehensive exploration of graphic design to date", praising its handling of chronology and visual layout. Megan N. Liberty of Hyperallergic praised the book for its scope, visual design, and broad historical overview. Rick Poynor of Eye criticized the book for contributing little to existing scholarship, although he found the book's visual design enjoyable.
