= Pablo Martín Arteaga =

Spanish wheelchair basketball player

Personal information
- Nationality: Spanish

Sport
- Country: Spain
- Sport: Wheelchair basketball

Pablo Martin Arteaga (born September 27, 1965, in Valladolid) is a wheelchair basketball athlete from Spain. He has a physical disability: he is a 2.5 point wheelchair basketball player. He played wheelchair basketball at the 1996 Summer Paralympics. His team lost to the United States to finish fourth.
