= Pat Keely =

British graphic artist

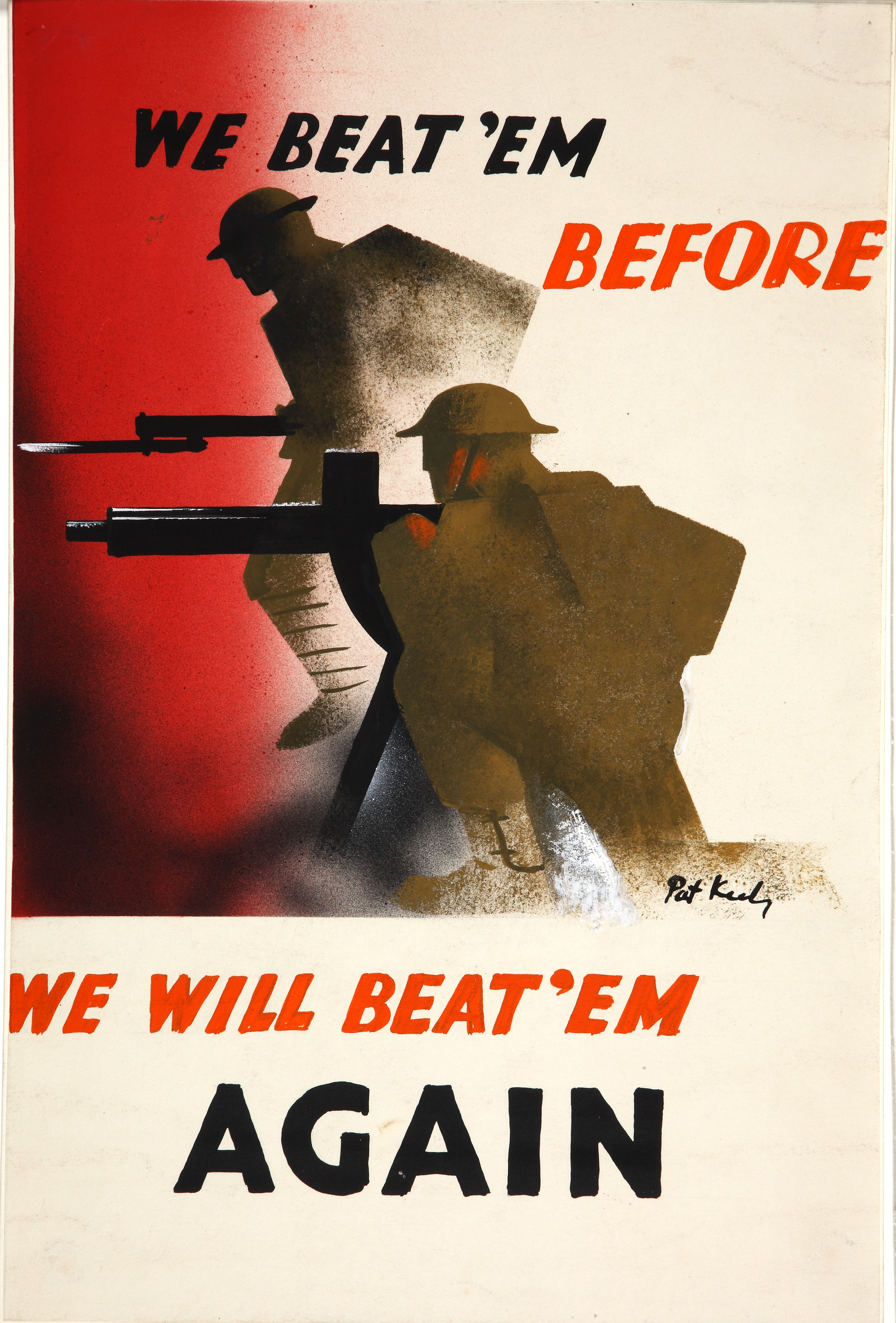
Second World War propaganda poster for the Ministry of Information by Pat Keely.

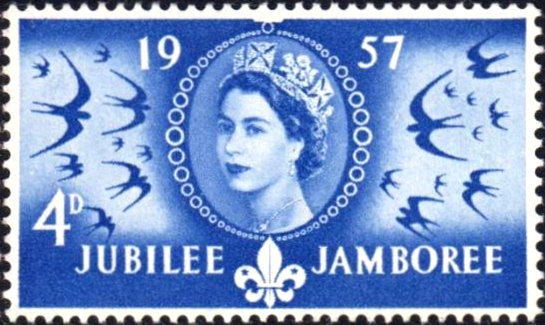
The 1957 4d World Scout Jubilee Jamboree stamp designed by Keely.

Patrick Cokayne Keely (1901–1970) was a British graphic artist known for his Second World War posters for the Ministry of Information along with stylised commercial posters for publishers, the GPO and public transport.

Keely also designed the British 4d World Scout Jubilee Jamboree stamp of 1957 and the 1s3d stamp from the 1958 Sixth British Empire and Commonwealth Games Cardiff set.

== Background ==
Keely was born in Nottingham. He was mostly self-taught.
