= Louis Silverstein =

American graphic designer

Louis Silverstein, 1981

Louis Silverstein (October 10, 1919 – December 1, 2011) was an American artist and graphic designer who is best known for his work at The New York Times. He was inducted into the Art Directors Hall of Fame in 1984.

== Biography ==
Silverstein was born in Brooklyn, New York. He attended Boys High School and graduated from the Pratt Institute with a degree in fine arts. During World War II, Silverstein served in the Army Air Forces, doing graphic design. After the war, he attended the Chicago Institute of Design, where he was exposed to avant-garde design.

Silverstein worked for a variety of employers, including labor unions and an advertising agency. He was art director for Amerika, a Russian magazine prepared by the U.S. State Department for distribution in the Soviet Union.

In 1952, Silverstein joined the promotions department at The New York Times. He helped make the newspaper more readable in 1967, when he enlarged the typeface. In 1976, he changed the format of the front page from eight columns to six. Also that year, he helped introduce the new weekday sections of the newspaper ("SportsMonday", "Science Times", "Living", "Home", and "Weekend").

Silverstein was inducted into the Art Directors Hall of Fame in 1984. At the time, Massimo Vignelli said, "We are affected by all the factors in the environment around us, and nothing is more ubiquitous than the newspaper. By changing the Times and influencing so many newspapers in other cities, we are indebted to him for improving the quality of our lives."

After his 1985 retirement, Silverstein continued to consult to The New York Times and other newspapers. He was responsible for the new look of 35 regional newspapers as well as papers in Brazil, Kenya, and Spain.

== Bibliography ==
- ——— (1990). Newspaper Design for the Times. New York: Van Nostrand Reinhold. ISBN 978-0-442-28321-6.

== Sources ==
- Martin, Douglas (December 1, 2011). "Louis Silverstein, Who Gave a Bolder and Airier Look to The Times, Dies at 92". The New York Times.
- Heller, Steven (December 2, 2011). "Louis Silverstein, Godfather of Modern Newspaper Design". Imprint.
- "Louis Silverstein, former New York Times art director who redesigned the newspaper, dies at 92". The Washington Post. December 2, 2011.
- "1984 Hall of Fame". Art Directors Club.
- Chung, Jen (December 2, 2011). "Influential NY Times Art Director, Louis Silverstein, Dies at 92". Gothamist. Archived from the original on February 25, 2018.
- Berlin, Jonathon; Dorsey, Steve (December 2, 2011). "A founder of modern newspaper design: Louis Silverstein, 1919–2011". Society for News Design.
- Apple, Charles (December 2, 2011). "News design legend Louis Silverstein passes away". American Copy Editors Society. Archived from the original on December 6, 2011.
- "Times Designer to Open Own Firm". The New York Times. February 20, 1989.
- "Silverstein's Designs". The New York Times. February 19, 1988.
- "Silverstein Is Retiring as an Editor of Times". The New York Times. January 1, 1985.
- "Times Named Best-Designed". The New York Times. November 19, 1984.
- LaConte, Vincent; Hoffman, Rebecca (November 2003). "Louis Silverstein, M.S. 1949". IIT Institute of Design. Archived from the original on February 5, 2009.
- Ritzenberg, Phil (Summer 2004). "Phil Ritzenberg on Louis Silverstein". Design Journal.
- Gupte, Pranay (December 4, 2011). "Louis Silverstein: the man who changed newspapers". The Hindu.
