= Rico Lins =

Rico Lins (born 19 September 1955 in Rio de Janeiro) is a Brazilian graphic designer, art director, illustrator and teacher.

== Education ==
He graduated in industrial design from the ESDI in 1976 and received his Diplome d’Études Approfondies in the Arts from Université de Paris viii, in 1981. In 1987, he obtained the title of Master of Arts from the Royal College of Art, London.

== Career ==
A former teacher at the School of Visual Arts in New York, he coordinated and currently teaches on the master's degree course in Graphic Design at the Istituto Europeo di Design, in São Paulo. He has given lectures and workshops in Brazil and abroad at events that include the Festival de Chaumont, Festival della Creatività Firenze, IED Barcelona, SENAC and SENAI, Escola Panamericana de Artes, Universidade do Livro, RevelaDesignRecife, as well as a touring programme of so-called analogical design workshops at his own studio and numerous institutions. He has had individual exhibitions of his work in Paris, São Paulo, Rio de Janeiro, Caracas and Chaumont, and has also actively participated as an exhibitor, curator and juror at the main congresses, biennials and collective exhibitions in design in numerous countries.

His articles and portfolio have been published in all the main international specialist magazines and books and his works feature in the permanent collections of important institutions, such as the Musée d’Histoire Contemporaine, Musée de l’Affiche et de La Publicité and Bibliothèque Nationale Française, in Paris, the Pôle Graphique de Chaumont, Sttatliches Museum für Angewandte Kunst, in Munich, and the Museu de Arte Contemporânea de São Paulo.

== Accolades and recognition ==
Among his various awards are gold medals from the NY Art Directors Club and Society of Publication Designers, the Prêmio Abril, Design by Designers 2001 and the Type Directors Club Merit Award in 2007. He is a member of the Comitê de Notáveis da Escola Panamericana de Artes (Board of Notables of the Escola Panamericana de Artes), São Paulo and has been a member of the AGI – Alliance Graphique Internationalle since 1997. Lins was one of the AGI Open conference organizers at the 2014 Auditorio Ibirapuera, in São Paulo.
