= Niklaus Troxler =

Swiss graphic designer and artist (born 1947)

Niklaus Troxler (born May 1, 1947) is a Swiss graphic designer and poster designer. He organized the Willisau Jazz Festival from 1975 to 2009.

== Biography ==
Troxler studied graphic design at the Lucerne University of Applied Sciences and Arts. He worked as an art director in Paris (1972). 1973 he founded his own design studio in Willisau, Switzerland. He began organizing jazz concerts in Willisau in 1966 (till 2013) and initiated the Willisau Jazz Festival in 1975. He directed the festival until 2009, when its organization was taken over by his nephew, Arno Troxler.

Troxler's graphic works, particularly his concert posters and record cover designs, have achieved widespread international recognition. He is an elected member of the Alliance Graphique Internationale (AGI). His posters are held in major permanent design collections worldwide, including the Museum of Modern Art (MoMA) in New York City, the Museum of Modern Art in Toyama, Hamburg's Museum for Art and Industry, the German Poster Museum in Essen, the Stedelijk Museum in Amsterdam, the Musée des Arts Décoratifs in Paris, the Museum Für Gestaltung (Design Museum) Zürich.

From 1998 to 2013, Troxler was professor for communication design at the State Academy of Fine Arts Stuttgart.

== Awards and honors ==
Troxler has received numerous international design accolades and cultural distinctions for his poster designs and contribution to visual arts:

- 1982: Innerschweizer Kulturpreis (Cultural Award of Central Switzerland)
- 1987, 1994: Toulouse-Lautrec Medal in Gold, German Poster Museum, Essen, Germany
- 1993: Grand Prix Award, Lahti Poster Biennale, Finland
- 1994: Honorary citizenship of his hometown, Willisau.
- 1997: Gold Award, Helsinki Poster Biennale, Finland
- 2003: Gold Award, China International Poster Biennial (Hangzhou)
- 2005: Taiwan International Poster Design Award
- 2006: Jury Award, 14th Colorado International Invitational Poster Exhibition (CIIPE), USA
- 2006: Gold Award, 4th International Poster Biennial in Ningbo, China
- 2022: Grand Prix at the Golden Bee in Moscow
- 2025: Doctor Honoris Causa, Academy of Fine Arts in Warsaw, Poland

== Publications ==
- Niklaus Troxler: "Jazz Blvd. – Niklaus Troxler Posters." Müller, Baden/Switzerland 1999, ISBN 3-907044-90-8.
- Niklaus Troxler and Olivier Senn: "Willisau and All That Jazz." Till Schaap Edition, Berne 2013, ISBN 978-3-03828-000-2.
- Manfred Buholzer: "Jazz in Willisau – Wie Niklaus Troxler den Free Jazz nach Willisau brachte." Comenius Verlag, Lucerne 2004, ISBN 3-906286-19-3.
- Jianping He (Ed.): "The Master of Design - Niklaus Troxler." Page One, Singapore 2006, ISBN 981-245426-8.
- Roxane Jubert (Ed.): "Niklaus Troxler – Designer & Design." Pyramyd, Paris 2007, ISBN 978-2-35017-054-1.
- Ginza Graphic Gallery (Ed.): "Niklaus Troxler." GGG Books, Tokyo 2007, ISBN 978-4-88752-365-4.
- Niklaus Troxler- Poster collection 34.Lars Müller publisher zurich 2022
- Niklaus Troxler - serious fun design international, Hangzhou/Berlin 2023

== Filmography ==
- Angelo A. Lüdin and Barbara Zürcher: "Niklaus Troxler - Jazz in Willisau - Ein Leben mit Jazz und Grafikdesign." (Documentary, point de vue, Basel 2011, 75 minutes).
