= Shigeo Fukuda =

Japanese artist (1932–2009)

- 福田 繁雄
- Born: April 4, 1932; Tokyo, Japan
- Died: January 11, 2009 (aged 76); Mitaka, Tokyo, Japan
- Education: Tokyo University of the Arts
- Occupation: Artist

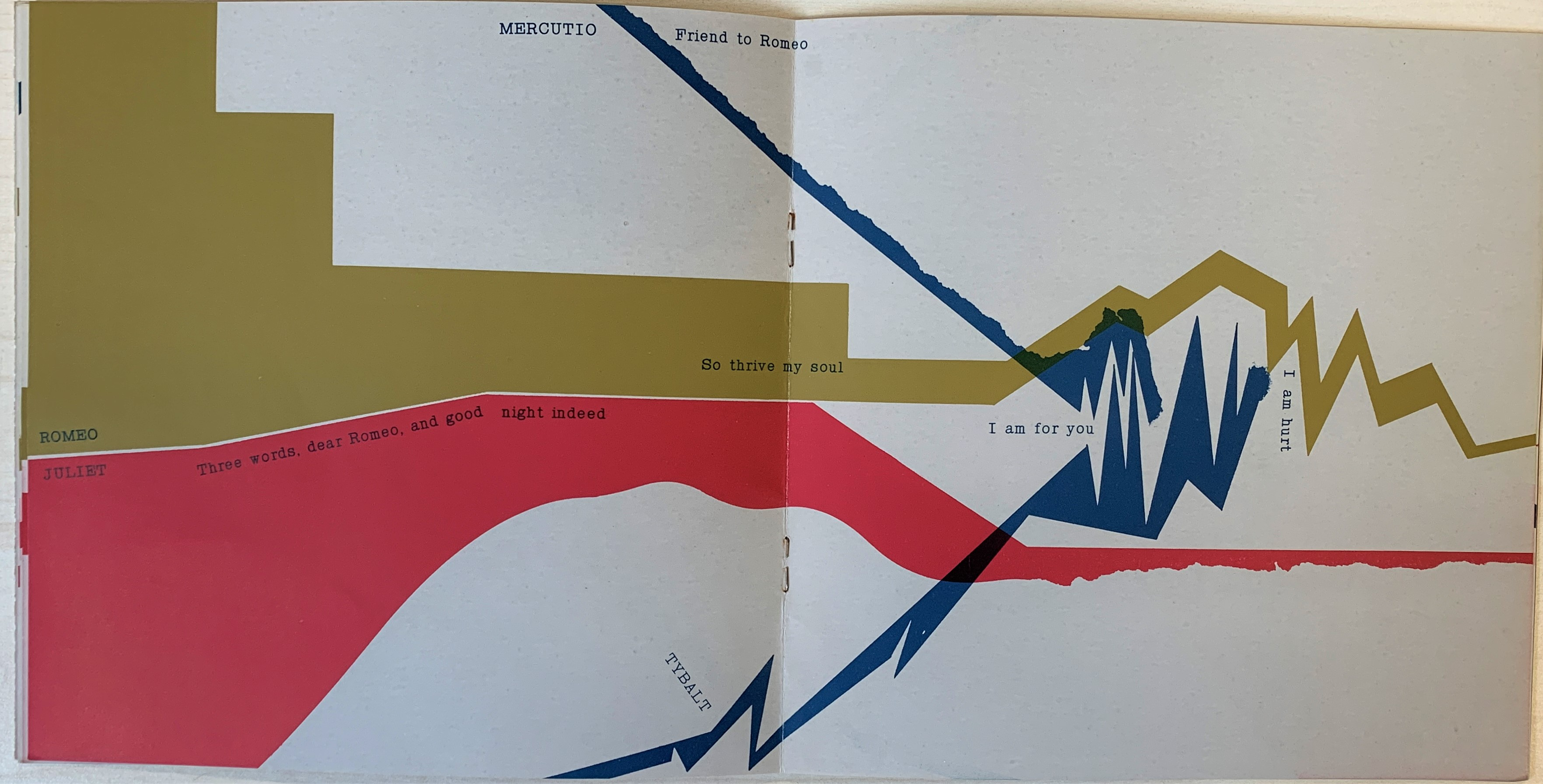
Illustration to Romeo and Juliet, 1965

Shigeo Fukuda (福田 繁雄, Fukuda Shigeo; February 4, 1932 – January 11, 2009) was a sculptor, medallist, graphic artist and poster designer who created optical illusions. He is one of Japan's most well-known post-war graphic designers. He is known to be an environmentalist and anti-war, for he designed posters on these social issues. His art pieces usually portray deception, such as Lunch With a Helmet On, a sculpture created entirely from forks, knives, and spoons, that casts a detailed shadow of a motorcycle.

== Career ==
Fukuda was born on February 4, 1932, in Tokyo to a family that was involved in manufacturing toys. After the end of World War II, he became interested in the minimalist Swiss Style of graphic design, and graduated from Tokyo National University of Fine Arts and Music in 1956.

The New York Times described how Fukuda's posters "distilled complex concepts into compelling images of logo-simplicity". His commercial work included his creation of the official poster for the 1970 World's Fair in Osaka. A 1980 poster created for Amnesty International features a clenched fist interwoven with barbed wire, with the letter "S" in the word "Amnesty" at the top of the poster formed from a linked shackle. "Victory 1945", one of his best-known works, features a projectile heading straight at the opening of the barrel of a cannon. A pair of posters created to celebrate Earth Day include a design showing the Earth as a seed opening against a solid sea-blue background and "1982 Happy Earth Day", which shows an axe with its head against the ground and a small branch sprouting upwards from its handle.

In 1987, Fukuda was inducted into the Art Directors Club Hall of Fame in New York City, which described him as "Japan's consummate visual communicator", making him the first Japanese designer chosen for this recognition. The Art Directors Club noted the "bitingly satirical commentary on the senselessness of war" shown in "Victory 1945", which won him the grand prize at the 1975 Warsaw Poster Contest, a competition whose proceeds went to the Peace Fund Movement.

In the late 1960s, Paul Rand saw Fukuda's art work and decided to help him arrange his first U.S. exhibition at New York City's IBM Gallery. This exhibition is what introduced Fukuda to a large variety of the recognition which he has gained.

Mr. Fukuda served as a Vice President of the Executive Board for the Icograda community from 1993-1995, making him quite a respected member. He was also formerly a vice chairman of the International Council of Graphic Design Associations and vice chairman of the Japanese Graphic Designers Association and also served as a member of Alliance Graphique International and of Tokyo Art Directors Club.

His home outside Tokyo featured a 4-foot-high (1.2 m) front door that would appear far away from someone approaching the house. This door was a visual trick, with the actual entrance to the house being an unornamented white door designed to blend in seamlessly with the walls of the house.

Fukuda died on January 11, 2009, after suffering a subarachnoid hemorrhage.

== Family ==
His daughter, Miran Fukuda (福田 美蘭), is a painter, and his father-in-law, Yoshio Hayashi (林 義雄), is a painter for children.

== Portfolio ==
- Mural at the Gymnasium of Taishido Junior High School, Tokyo
- Grapes
- Love Story (1973)
- Man (1974)
- Woman (1974)
- Cat/Mouse (1974)
- Encore (1976)
- Three-Dimensional Belvedere (1982)
- Underground Piano (1984)
- Venus in a Mirror (1984)
- Disappearing Pillar (1985)
- Three-Dimensional Model of Escher's Waterfall (1985)
- Lunch With a Helmet On (1987)
- Aquarium for Swimming Characters (1988)
