= Astrid Stavro =

Italian graphic designer based in London

Astrid Stavro (born Astrid Christina Antonia Stavro di Santarosa y Marone-Cinzano on 2 April 1972) is an Italian graphic designer based in London.

Born in Trieste, she grew up in the city of Madrid, Spain, where she spent a lot of time in a pressing plant where her father worked. Stavro also spent a large portion of her childhood reading literature classics, everything from Borges to Paul Auster to Aldous Huxley to Raymond Carver to John Berger, "all these authors have been my first and best teachers and this is why I now love to write about design." Stavro studied philosophy and literature at Boston University. "I guess this 'inquisitive' approach still informs my work and the process behind it," she explains. Stavro wasn't introduced to graphic design until the 80's, where she visited a friend who "had every single issue of Fabien Baron's Interview magazine." "I had never seen anything like Interview before my friend, a Londoner, told me that what I was looking at was called 'graphic design'." From seeing Interview magazine, Stavro's love for graphic design had awakened and helped her to land her first design job in a small three-person studio in Madrid when she returned from Boston, "I heard they were looking for designers and I turned up saying something like: 'I don't have a portfolio but I learn really fast'." She studied graphic design at Central Saint Martins College of Art & Design, graduating in 2000. She then went Royal College of Art, London, where she graduated with a Master of Arts.

In 2005 she co- founded Studio Astrid Stavro, with Pablo Martín, specialising in typography and editorial design. She is co-founder and creative director of Atlas, a branding and design consultancy. Astrid Stavro is a member of a group called International Society of Typographic Designers (ISTD). In 2010 she was elected to be a member of Alliance Graphique Internationale (AGI).

In October 2018, Stavro joined the London office of Pentagram as a partner. She left Pentagram in October 2021 to set up her own design consultancy.

== Works ==
=== Cuadernos Postal ===
Cuadernos Postal is a project Stavro did in 2009. Cuadernos Postal (Postcard Notebooks) is a group of monographs on specific artist and architects. Each one of these notebooks has three different parts; a small book, numerous postcards, and a folded poster. The cover of the notebooks are divided in half by a vertical line. The top half has the title in bold typographic letters. The bottom half is majority blank.

=== Ensaimad Art ===
In 2012, Stavro created this project to celebrate the 50th anniversary of amadip.esment foundation.

== Recognition and awards ==
- D&AD (2021), Wood Pencil, 413 Magazine
- ISTD (International Society of Typographic Designers) (2009), 2 Premier Awards
- European Design Awards, (2009), Silver -- Syzygy
- Laus Awards (2009), Gold + 14 Silver
- D&AD (2009), In-Book The Death of Innocence, (by Mercè Rodoreda)
- The Annual, Creative Review (2009)
- Visual (2009), Gold
- Laus Awards (2008), 3 Gold
- Graphis, NY (2007), Platinum and Gold Art of the Grid
- Design Week Awards (2008), Gold
- Art Directors Club, NY (2007), Distinctive Merit
- I.D. Annual Design, NY (2007), Honorary mention
- Art Directors Club of Europe (2006), Gold
- Laus Awards (2006), Gold
- The Annual, Creative Review (2006)
- D&AD (2006), In-Book

Publications:

- D&AD Annual, 2009
- Area 2, Phaidon
- Grafik, London 2009 (Profile)
- Creative Review, June 2009 -- A very bookish designer
- Novum, Berlin 2009 --
- Wallpaper, October 2006
