= Herbert Leupin =

Swiss graphic designer

Herbert Leupin (20 December 1916, in Beinwil am See – 21 September 1999, in Basel) was a Swiss graphic designer known primarily for his poster art.

== Life and work ==
From 1931 until 1934, Leupin attended the Kunstgewerbeschule in Basel. From 1951 until 1964, he worked as an advertising consultant for the German cigarette manufacturer Reemtsma. During this time he also created the Milka cow image. Leupin made his name in the 1940s through his use of the magic realism style of images for advertising consumer goods.
