= List of AIGA medalists =

American Institute of Graphic Arts medal
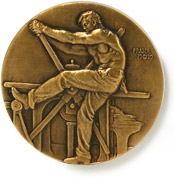
- The physical medal was designed by sculptor James Earle Fraser in 1920. (Note: Fraser was not, himself, the recipient of an AIGA medal.)
- Awarded for: Exceptional achievements, services or other contributions to the field of graphic design and visual communication
- Presented by: American Institute of Graphic Arts (AIGA)
- First award: 1920; 106 years ago
- Website: www.aiga.org

Since 1920, the American Institute of Graphic Arts (AIGA) has awarded medals "to individuals in recognition of their exceptional achievements, services or other contributions to the field of graphic design and visual communication." Below is a list of AIGA medalists.

Nine medals were awarded in the 1920s, seven in the 1930s, eight in the 1940s, twelve in the 1950s, ten in the 1960s, 13 in the 1970s, 13 in the 1980s, and 33 in the 1990s. Since 2000, a larger number of medals have awarded; 45 were awarded from 2000 to 2009.

== 2020s ==
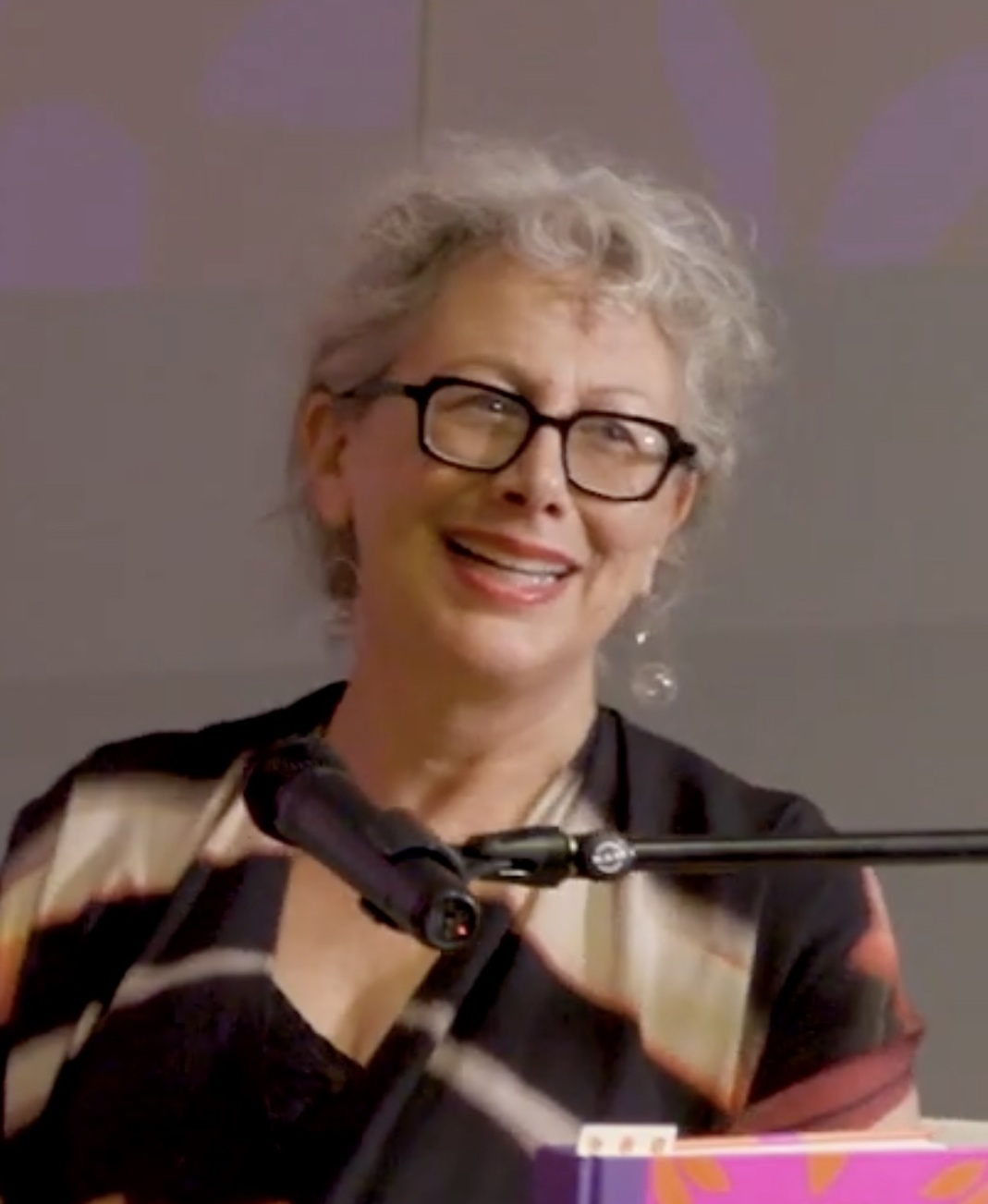
Louise Sandhaus

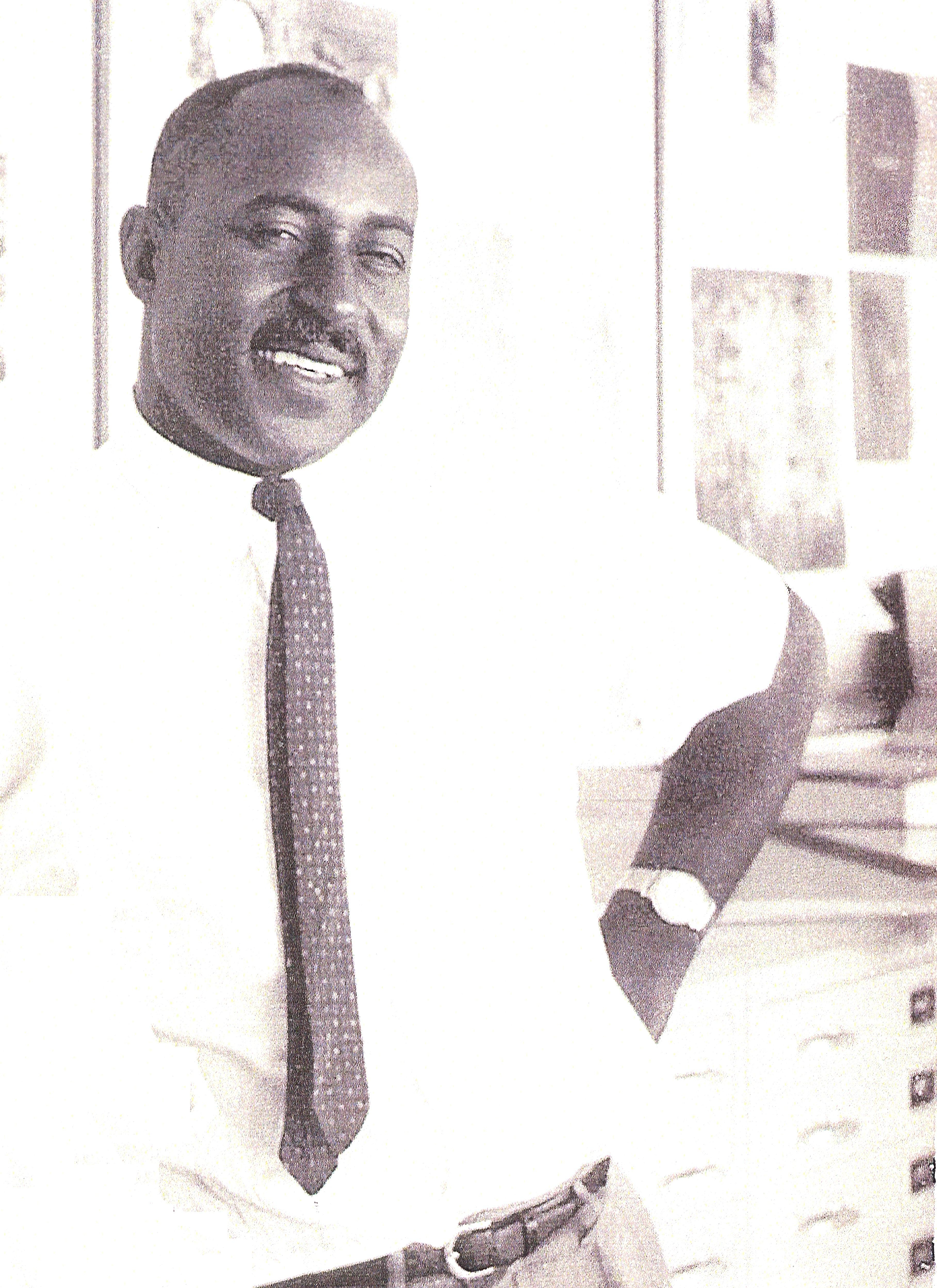
Thomas Miller

=== 2025 ===
- Elizabeth Resnick
- Rick Griffith
- Dorothy E. Hayes
- Maria Giudice

=== 2022 ===
- Andrew Satake Blauvelt
- Emily Oberman
- Louise Sandhaus

=== 2021 ===
- Archie Boston, Jr.
- Cheryl D. Miller
- Terry Irwin
- Thomas Miller (honorary)

== 2010s ==
=== 2019 ===
- Alexander Girard
- Geoff McFetridge
- Debbie Millman

=== 2018 ===
- Aaron Douglas
- Arem Duplessis
- Karin Fong
- Susan Kare
- Victor Moscoso

=== 2017 ===
- Art Chantry
- Emmett McBain
- Rebeca Méndez
- Mark Randall
- Nancy Skolos and Tom Wedell
- Lance Wyman

=== 2016 ===
- Ruth Ansel
- Richard Grefé
- Maira Kalman
- Gere Kavanaugh
- Corita Kent

=== 2015 ===
- Paola Antonelli
- Hillman Curtis
- Emory Douglas
- Dan Friedman
- Marcia Lausen

=== 2014 ===
- Sean Adams and Noreen Morioka
- Charles S. Anderson
- Dana Arnett
- Kenneth Carbone and Leslie Smolan
- David Carson
- Kyle Cooper
- Michael Patrick Cronan
- Richard Danne
- Michael Donovan and Nancye Green
- Stephen Doyle
- Louise Fili
- Bob Greenberg
- Sylvia Harris
- Cheryl Heller
- Alexander Isley
- Chip Kidd
- Michael Mabry
- J. Abbott Miller
- Bill Moggridge
- Gael Towey
- Ann Willoughby

=== 2013 ===
- John Bielenberg
- William Drenttel
- Tobias Frere-Jones
- Jessica Helfand
- Jonathan Hoefler
- Stefan Sagmeister
- Lucille Tenazas
- Wolfgang Weingart

=== 2011 ===
- Ralph Caplan
- Elaine Lustig Cohen
- Armin Hofmann
- Robert Vogele

=== 2010 ===
- Steve Frykholm
- John Maeda
- Jennifer Morla

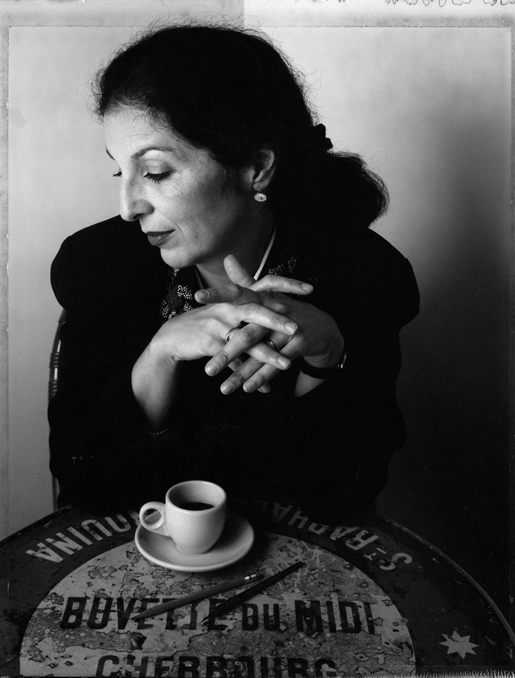
Louise Fili

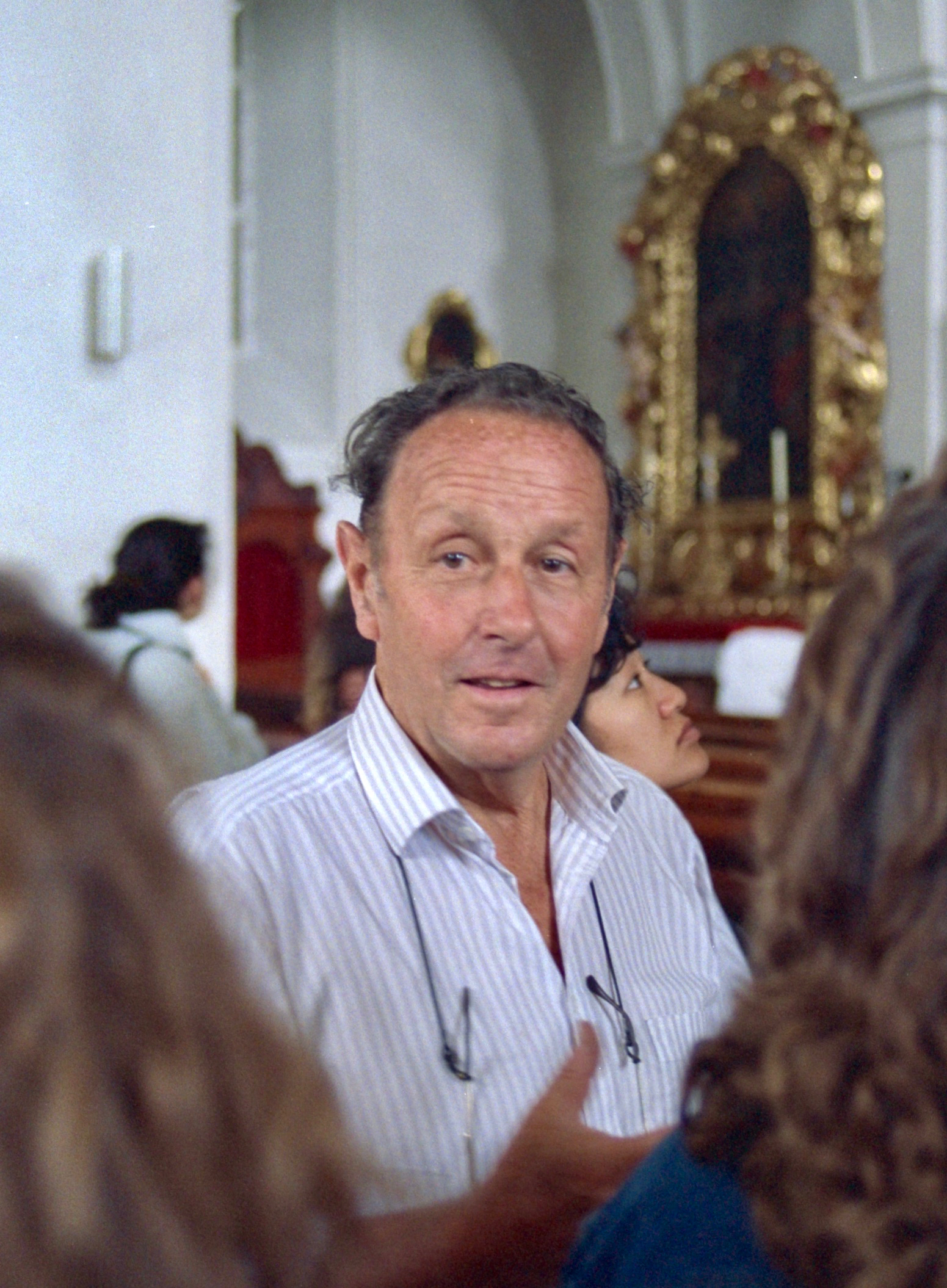
Armin Hofmann

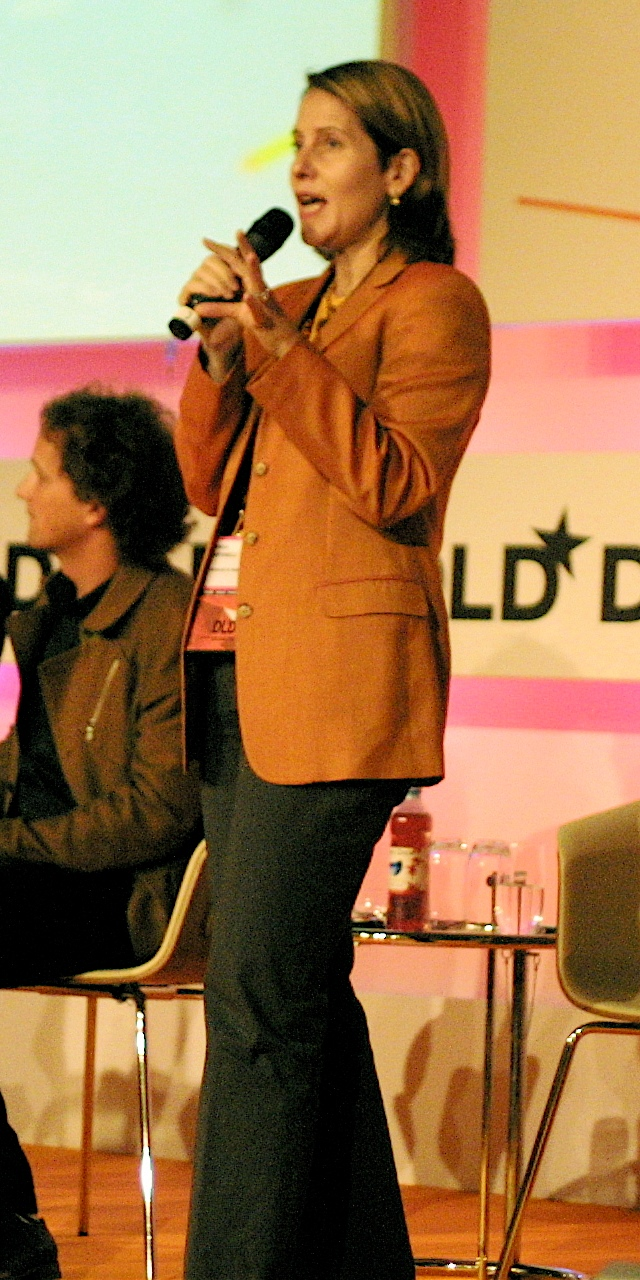
Paola Antonelli

== 2000s ==
=== 2009 ===
- Pablo Ferro
- Carin Goldberg
- Doyald Young

=== 2008 ===
- Gail Anderson
- Clement Mok
- LeRoy Winbush

=== 2007 ===
- Edward Fella
- Ellen Lupton
- Bruce Mau
- Georg Olden

=== 2006 ===
- Michael Bierut
- Rick Valicenti
- Lorraine Wild

=== 2005 ===
- Bart Crosby
- Meredith Davis
- Steff Geissbühler

=== 2004 ===
- Joseph Binder
- Charles Coiner
- Richard, Jean and Patrick Coyne
- James Cross
- Sheila Levrant de Bretteville
- Jay Doblin
- Joe Duffy
- Martin Fox
- Caroline Warner Hightower
- Kit Hinrichs
- Walter Landor
- Philip Meggs
- James Miho
- Silas Rhodes
- Jack Stauffacher
- Alex Steinweiss
- Deborah Sussman
- Edward Tufte
- Fred Woodward
- Richard Saul Wurman

=== 2003 ===
- B. Martin Pedersen
- Woody Pirtle

=== 2002 ===
- Robert Brownjohn
- Chris Pullman

=== 2001 ===
- Samuel Antupit
- Paula Scher

=== 2000 ===
- P. Scott Makela and Laurie Haycock Makela Archived 2011-05-14 at the Wayback Machine
- Fred Seibert
- Michael Vanderbyl

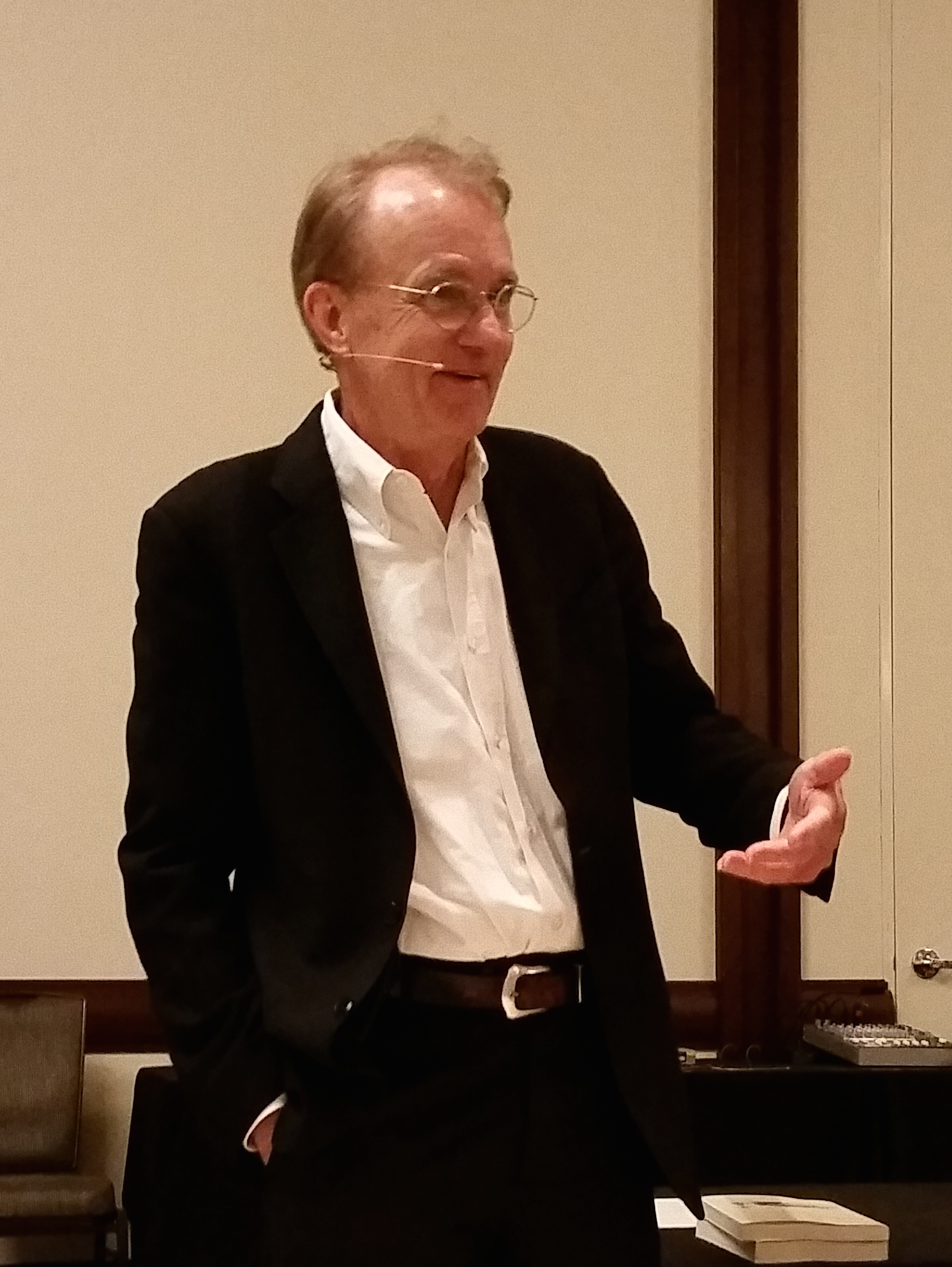
Edward Tufte

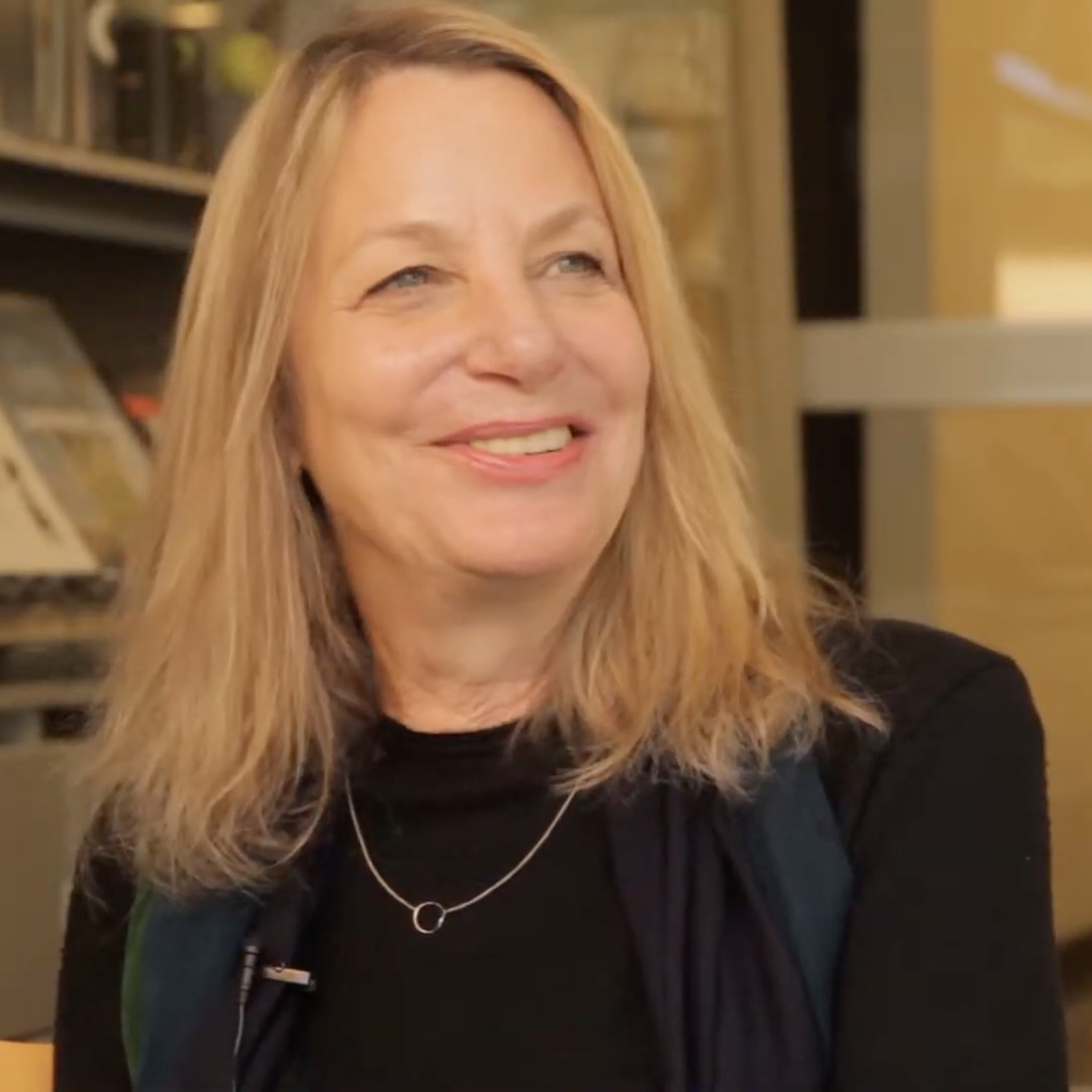
Paula Scher

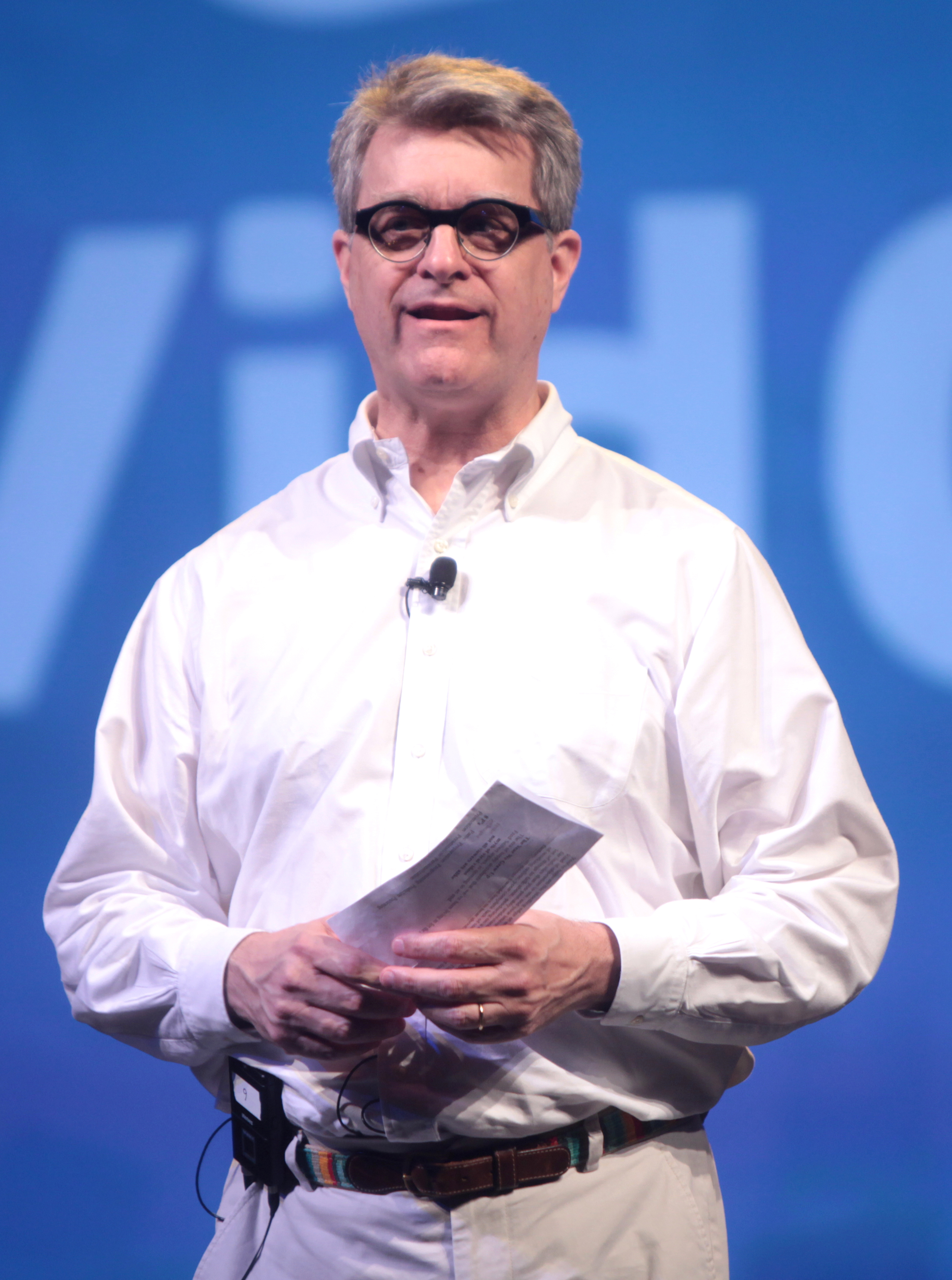
Fred Seibert

== 1990s ==
=== 1999 ===
- Tibor Kalman
- Steven Heller
- Katherine McCoy

=== 1998 ===
- Louis Danziger
- April Greiman

=== 1997 ===
- Lucian Bernhard
- Zuzana Licko and Rudy VanderLans

=== 1996 ===
- Cipe Pineles
- George Lois

=== 1995 ===
- Matthew Carter
- Stan Richards
- Ladislav Sutnar

=== 1994 ===
- Muriel Cooper
- John Massey

=== 1993 ===
- Alvin Lustig
- Tomoko Miho

=== 1992 ===
- Rudolph de Harak
- George Nelson
- Lester Beall

=== 1991 ===
- Colin Forbes
- E. McKnight Kauffer

=== 1990 ===
- Alvin Eisenman
- Frank Zachary

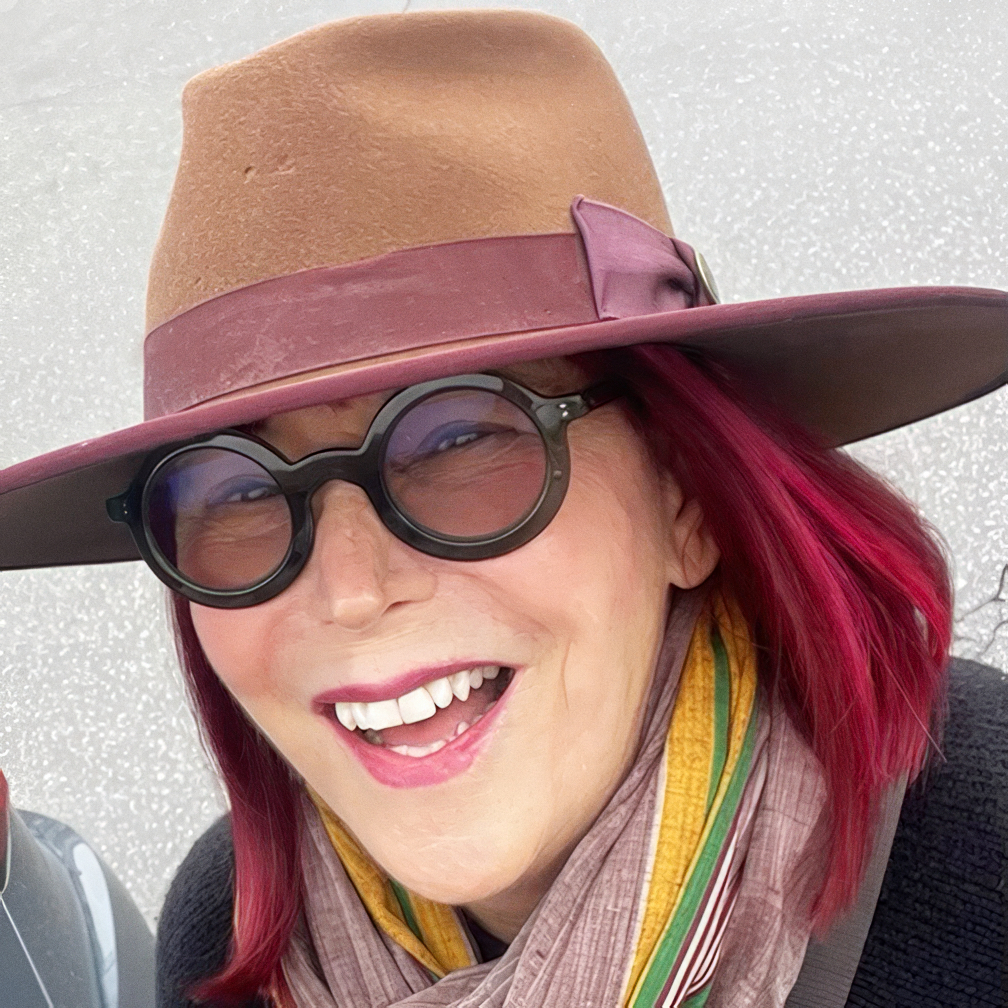
April Greiman

== 1980s ==
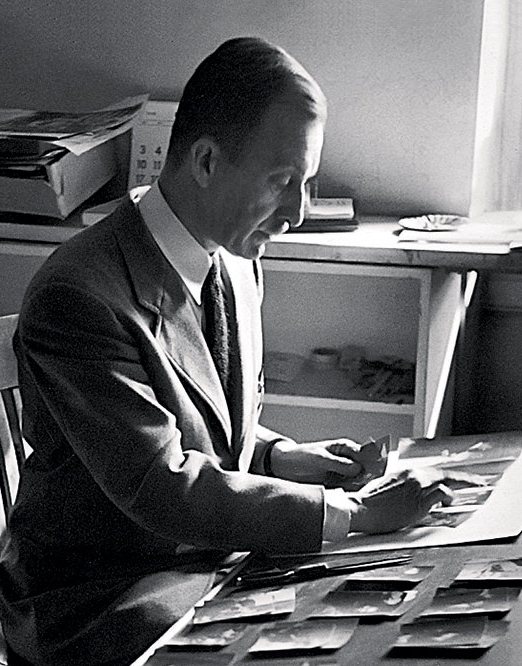
Alexey Brodovitch

- Paul Davis, 1989
- Bea Feitler, 1989
- William Golden, 1988
- George Tscherny, 1988
- Alexey Brodovitch, 1987
- Gene Federico, 1987
- Walter Herdeg, 1986
- Seymour Chwast, 1985
- Leo Lionni, 1984
- Herbert Matter, 1983
- Massimo Vignelli and Lella Vignelli, 1982
- Saul Bass, 1981
- Herb Lubalin, 1980

== 1970s ==
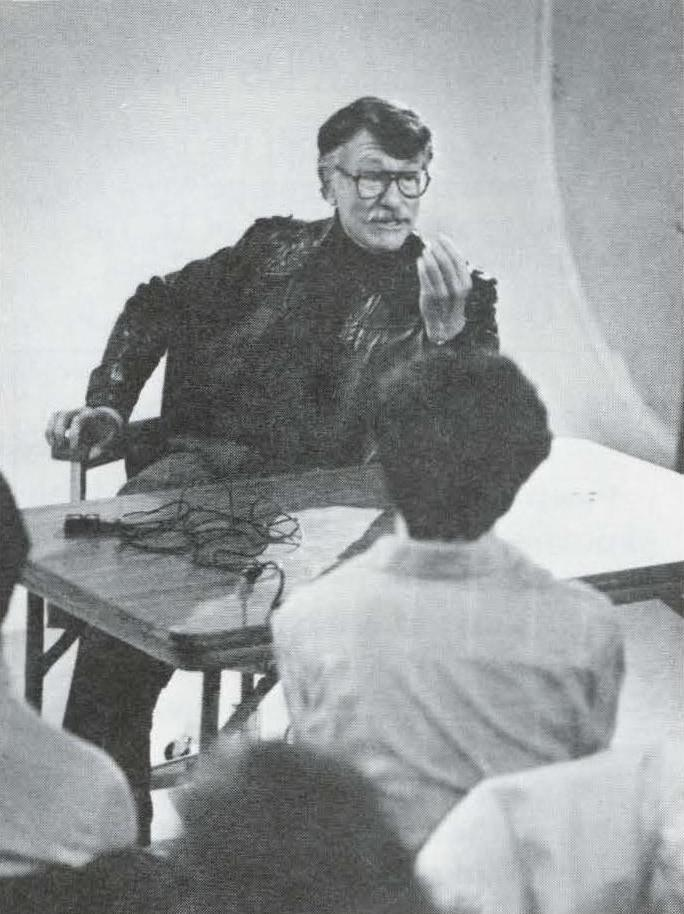
Lou Dorfsman

- Ivan Chermayeff and Thomas Geismar, 1979
- Lou Dorfsman, 1978
- Charles and Ray Eames, 1977
- Henry Wolf, 1976
- Jerome Snyder, 1976
- Bradbury Thompson, 1975
- Robert Rauschenberg, 1974
- Richard Avedon, 1973
- Allen Hurlburt, 1973
- Philip Johnson, 1973
- Milton Glaser, 1972
- Will Burtin, 1971
- Herbert Bayer, 1970

== 1960s ==
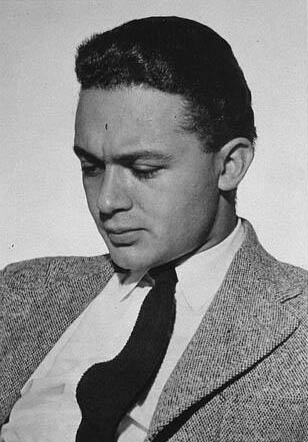
Paul Rand

- Dr. Robert L. Leslie, 1969
- Dr. Giovanni Mardersteig, 1968
- Romana Javitz, 1967
- Paul Rand, 1966
- Leonard Baskin, 1965
- Josef Albers, 1964
- Saul Steinberg, 1963
- William Sandberg, 1962
- Paul A. Bennett, 1961
- Walter Paepcke, 1960

== 1950s ==
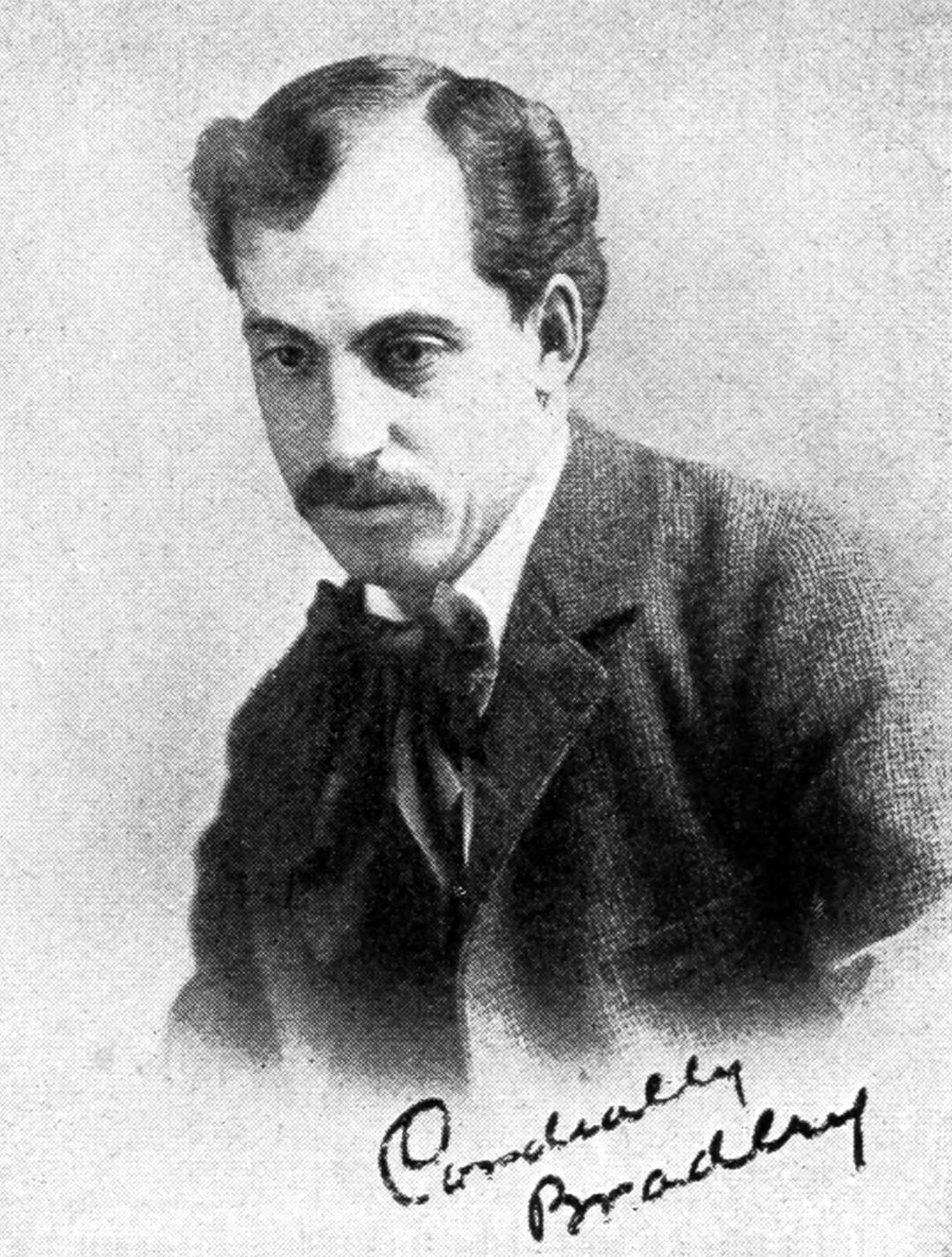
Will Bradley

- May Massee, 1959
- Ben Shahn, 1958
- Dr. M. F. Agha, 1957
- Ray Nash, 1956
- P. J. Conkwright, 1955
- Will Bradley, 1954
- Jan Tschichold, 1954
- George Macy, 1953
- Joseph Blumenthal, 1952
- Harry L. Gage, 1951
- Earnest Elmo Calkins, 1950
- Alfred A. Knopf, 1950

== 1940s ==
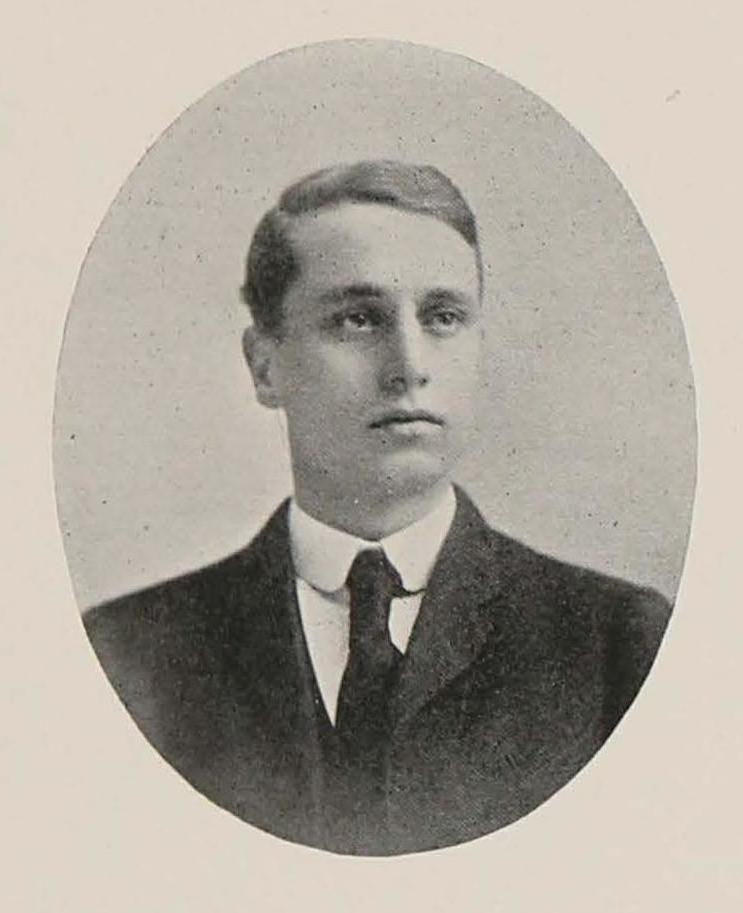
Lawrence C. Wroth

- Lawrence C. Wroth, 1948
- Elmer Adler, 1947
- Stanley Morison, 1946
- Frederic G. Melcher, 1945
- Edward Epstean, 1944
- Edwin and Robert Grabhorn, 1942
- Carl Purington Rollins, 1941
- Thomas M. Cleland, 1940

== 1930s ==
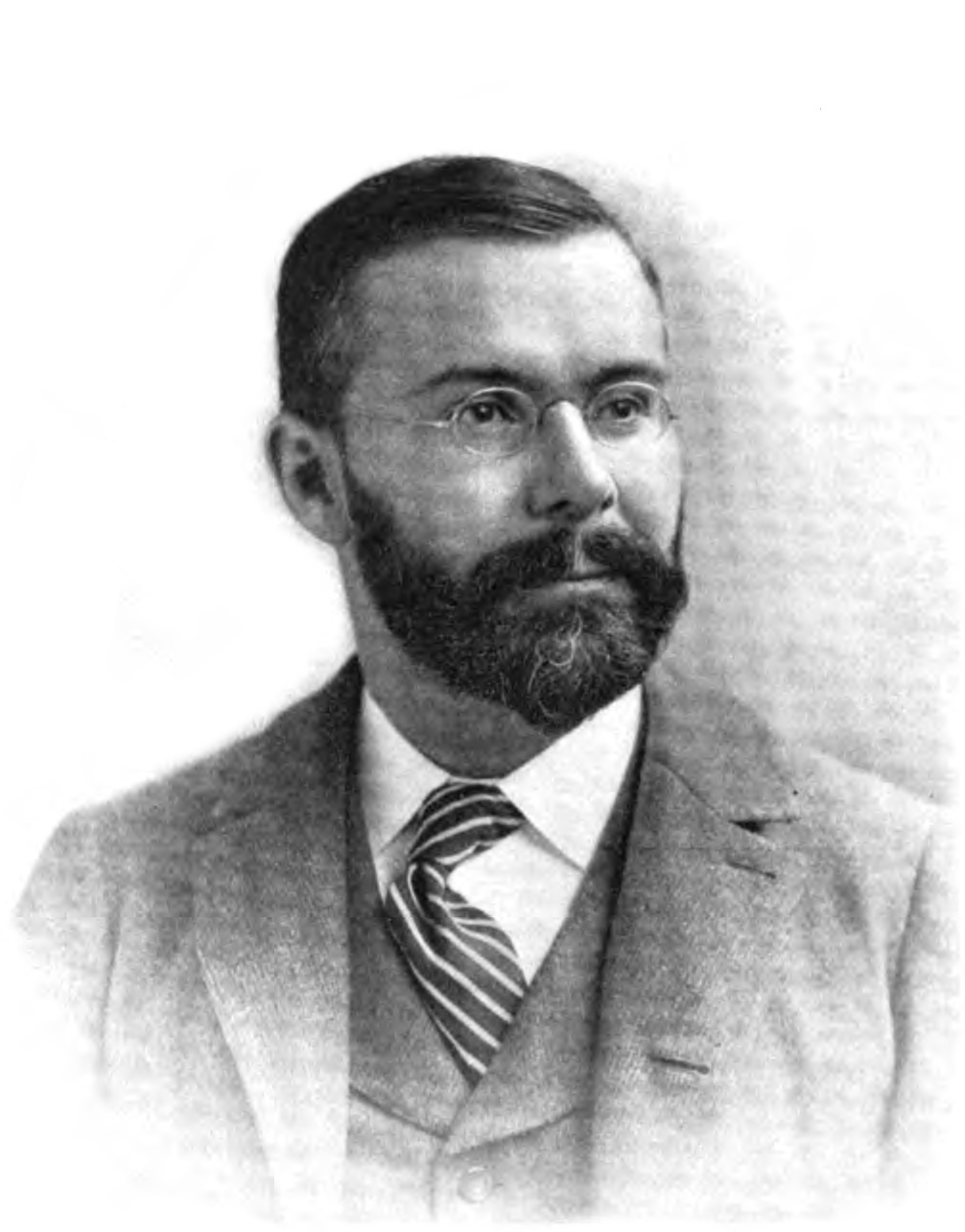
Henry Lewis Bullen

- William A. Kittredge, 1939
- Rudolph Ruzicka, 1935
- J. Thompson Willing, 1935
- Henry Lewis Bullen, 1934
- Porter Garnett, 1932
- Dard Hunter, 1931
- Henry Watson Kent, 1930

== 1920s ==
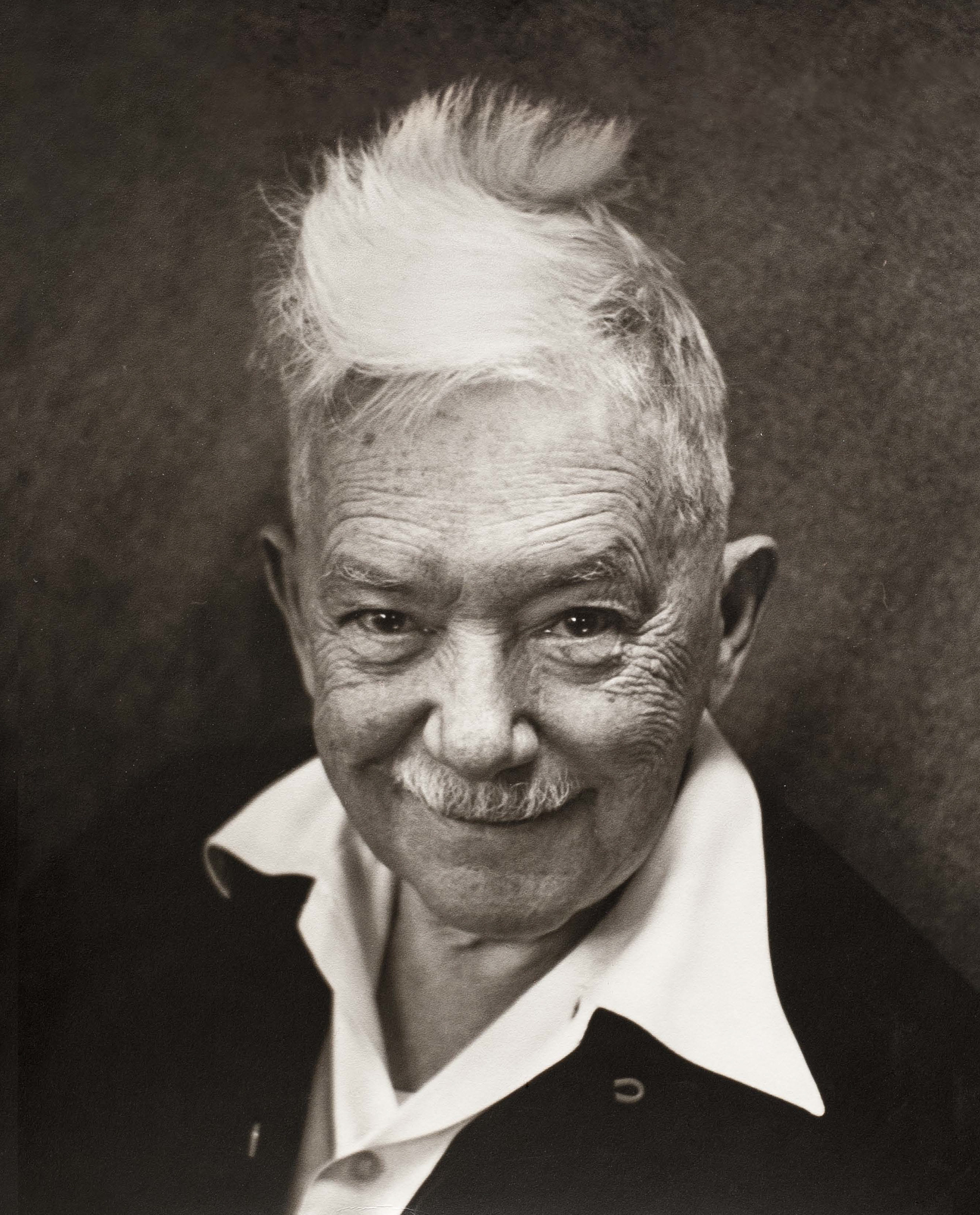
William A. Dwiggins

- William A. Dwiggins, 1929
- Timothy Cole, 1927
- Frederic W. Goudy, 1927
- Burton Emmett, 1926
- Bruce Rogers, 1925
- John G. Agar, 1924
- Stephen H. Horgan, 1924
- Daniel Berkeley Updike, 1922
- Norman T. A. Munder, 1920

== See also ==
- Art Directors Club Hall of Fame
- Masters Series (School of Visual Arts)
- List of design awards
