= Ray Nash =

American art historian

Ray Nash (February 27, 1905 – May 21, 1982) was an American graphic arts historian and expert on calligraphy and the history of printing.

== Biography ==
Nash was born in Oregon and was a 1928 graduate of the University of Oregon. He was an art instructor at the New School in New York. In 1937 he began a long association with Dartmouth College as a lecturer; he received a graduate degree there in 1949 (along with an M.A. from Harvard in 1947), was a professor of art in 1949, Director of Publications in 1960, and a professor emeritus in 1970. Nash ran the Graphic Arts Workshop at Dartmouth from 1937 until 1970.

In 1945, Nash designed a new railroad schedule for the Boston & Maine Railroad featuring legible typography and cartoon illustrators to decipher the previously confusing data. From 1953 to 1965, Nash was co-editor with Roderick Stinehour of Printing & Graphic Arts, a journal devoted to typography and printing and printed by the Stinehour Press in Lunenberg, Vermont.

Nash was awarded the AIGA medal in 1956.

Nash lectured on bibliography at Oxford University in 1965, and according to the New York Times "was an authority on handwriting and the author of several books on calligraphy and printing. He was an officer of the Order of Leopold from the Belgian Government and a Fellow of the American Academy of Arts and Sciences and the Society of Antiquaries of London." Nash was an advisor to the Plantin-Moretus Museum in Antwerp.

== Works ==
- Nash, Ray and Rugg, Harold Goddard, Pioneer printing at Dartmouth in issue 46 of Keepsake of the Columbiad Club, published by George T. Bailey, Hanover, 40 pages, 1941.
- Nash, Ray, Rollo G. Silver, and Roderick D. Stinehour, ed. Notes on Printing & Graphic Arts, Stinehour Press, 1953.
- Nash, Ray, Printing as an Art, Harvard University Press, Cambridge, 1955.
- Nash, Ray, editor, Calligraphy and Printing in the Sixteenth Century, Plantin-Moretus Museum, Antwerp, 1964.
- Nash, Ray, American Penmanship 1800-1850. A history of writing and a bibliography of copybooks from Jenkins to Spencer, American Antiquarian Society, 1969.
- Nash, Ray, Education in the Graphic Arts, Boston Public Library, Boston, MA, 1969.
- Nash, Ray and Nicolete Gray, Nineteenth Century Ornamented Typefaces, Faber & Faber, 1976.

== Bibliography ==
- Guide to the Papers of Ray Nash, Dartmouth College – Biography of Nash
- Eisenman, Alvin, Ray Nash: His Students and His Legacy, Print, Nov/Dec90, Vol. 44 Issue 6, p. 140.
