= Edward Epstean =

German-American photoengraver and translator

Edward Epstean (September 19, 1868 – August 7, 1945) was a photoengraver, book collector, and translator.

== Biography ==
Edward Epstean was born on September 19, 1868, in Bohemia and immigrated to the United States in 1888. In 1889, he was employed at the electrotyping firm Hopkins & Blaut where he established their photoengraving department in 1892. In 1890, he married Josephine A. Kupfer. In 1898, he partnered with H.L. Walker and founded the Walker Engraving Company.

As Edward Epstean was working on Hopkins & Blaut's new photoengraving department, he also started a personal library to better understand the reproductive processes of photography. His library grew with the acquisitions of Stephen H. Horgan, William Gamble, Josef Maria Eder, and Gabriel Cromer. In 1934, The Epstean Collection was incorporated in The Columbia University Library with the help of curator Hellmut Lehmann-Haupt. Epstean viewed the collection as a work-in-progress and added to the collection and helped to secure funds for new acquisitions. He was president of the Photoengravers Board of Trade from 1929 to 1934.

In 1932, Epstean started translating Josef Maria Eder's History of Photography and in 1935 it was published by Columbia University Press. With Epstean's translation, Eder's work became the standard work in the English-speaking world. He also translated other important photohistorical studies from French and German by Victor Fouqué, Georges Potonnieé, and Erich Stenger.

His contribution to scholarship was recognized by the Davanne medal from the Société française de photographie in 1935, honorary fellowship of the Royal Photographic Society, and the AIGA Medal in 1944.

Epstean died on August 7, 1945 in New York City.

== Publications ==
- Epstean, Edward, translator. History of Photography. By Josef Maria Eder, New York, Columbia University Press, 1935.
- Epstean, Edward, translator. The history of the discovery of photography. By Georges Potonnieé, New York, Tennant and Ward, 1936.
