= Katherine McCoy =

American graphic designer

- Born: Katherine Jane Braden; October 12, 1945 (age 79); Decatur, Illinois, US
- Education: Michigan State University, Industrial design Graduated 1967
- Known for: Graphic designer

Katherine McCoy (born October 12, 1945) is an American graphic designer and educator, best known for her work as the co-chair of the graduate Design program for Cranbrook Academy of Art.

During her extensive career spanning education and professional practice, McCoy worked with groundbreaking design firm Unimark, Chrysler Corporation, and with Muriel Cooper in the early days of MIT Press while at the Boston design firm Omnigraphics. McCoy's career in education was similarly broad, teaching at Cranbrook Academy of Art, Illinois Institute of Technology's Institute of Design, and the Royal College of Art, London. She is also the co-founder of High Ground, a yearly conference created for professional designers.

== Early career ==
McCoy was born Katherine Jane Braden in Decatur, Illinois in 1945. As a student, she first studied interior design at Michigan State University but switched to industrial design, in which field she graduated in 1967. A visit of the Museum of Modern Art during a family trip to the New York World's Fair in 1964 had made her aware that her interest was in the power of design.

Shortly after graduation, McCoy joined Unimark International, a design firm led by many key figures in American Modernist graphic design, including Massimo Vignelli, Ralph Eckerstrom of Container Corporation, Jay Doblin and Herbert Bayer. It was at the interdisciplinary Unimark offices where McCoy was exposed to the strict Swiss typographic and design approaches which came to permeate much of American corporate communications through the late 1960s and 70s.

Following Unimark, McCoy worked for a year in the corporate identity offices of the Chrysler Corporation, then joined the Boston design firm Omnigraphics, where she worked on several projects for the MIT Press with Muriel Cooper. Next she joined Designers & Partners, the Detroit advertising design studio where she met the designer - illustrator - cartoonist Edward Fella. Designers & Partners focused solely on working with advertising agencies and had a staff that included a wide variety of graphic arts professionals, including illustrators, cartoonists, and "lettering men" as well as graphic designers. Although McCoy found that ad agency work was not very compatible with design thinking and ethics, the opportunities she was given and connections she made are an important part of her design experience. She also worked with other professional practices including Xerox Education Group, and major advertising agencies.

In 1971 she founded the practice McCoy & McCoy, Inc, with her husband, Michael McCoy.

== Career in design education ==
In fall 1971, McCoy began her career in design education when she was appointed co-chair of the Cranbrook Academy of Art graduate design program with her husband Michael McCoy. While McCoy led the graphic design program, and Michael McCoy led the industrial design program, both 2D and 3D design students shared studios, and explored interdisciplinary approaches towards designing. Katherine describes combining the "objective" typographic approach that she knew through reading and the Unimark experience with an interest in the social and cultural activism that was in the air in the late '60s when creating and reinventing the program. Early conceptual influences on the Cranbrook design approach were Robert Venturi's book Learning from Las Vegas (1972), Richard Saul Wurman's publishing on the man-made environment, and McCoy's own interest in social design and design vernacular. The commercial vernacular collages of Edward Fella, the Basel experiments of Wolfgang Weingart and a Yale project by Dan Friedman were visual design influences. Later sources included semiotics, post-structuralism, literary theory and deconstruction; both the students' and McCoy's work experimented with applications of these ideas to communications design. Katherine designed many projects for the Cranbrook Educational Community including quarterly magazines, art catalogs, Art Academy departmental posters and museum exhibitions that she and Michael produced as McCoy & McCoy.

Reinvented by the McCoys, the program was organized around experimentation in the studio, with minimal structure or assignments – a return to the Art Academy's original method. There were no deadlines, papers, or finals, other than the expectation of new work in weekly critiques and semester-end self-evaluations and extended bibliographies. A final degree project and thesis were required in the last semester. The McCoys required students to read deeply about the history and theory behind the design concerns on which they were focusing. Each student was encouraged to develop their own design voice and vision, through a mix of studio experiments and client projects, sometimes on grant-funded projects with the McCoys. Students sometimes had the opportunity to work directly with Katherine McCoy, and this became the counterbalance for the experimental studio work. The process that Katherine and Michael McCoy brought to the program initiated change in many aspects. It transformed the design program itself and the studios, along with its critiques, centered on the possibility of breaking from the norms of everyday design practice. Cranbrook graduated over 200 students under the direction of the McCoys, many of whom also went on to become design educators. Although the McCoy's program was sometimes thought to be controversial, their tenure at Cranbrook resulted in the graduation and success of many known designers, including Lorraine Wild, Edward Fella, Nancy Skolos and Tom Wedell, P. Scott Makela, Andrew Blauvelt, Lucille Tenazas, Meredith Davis and Patrick Whitney. After McCoy left Cranbrook in 1995, she held several other teaching positions. Her most well-known position with the Illinois Institute of Technology's Institute of Design, from 1995–2003, and the Royal College of Art in London.

In 1991, Katherine and Michael McCoy, along with a team 2-D students, produced the book "Cranbrook Design: The New Discourse" (Rizzoli International Publications). The book documented the work that produced in the Cranbrook studios during the 1980s, and it "probably sealed the reputation of the school" as a place where the visual qualities of the work, sometimes generated by a highly creative interpretation of theory, took precedence without regard to the "needs of the profession". The critiques of the work represented in the book were often voiced without knowledge of the actual discourse of the studio critique. Led by the McCoys, experimentation was challenged to be as real as possible.

After 24 years of creative work, the McCoys left their positions in 1995. They moved to Buena Vista, Colorado, where they opened the design studio McCoy & McCoy Associates. Later, they moved to Chicago where they spent each fall semester at the Illinois Institute of Technology's Institute of Design, giving senior lectures and seminars until 2004.

== Later career ==
McCoy now consults in communications design, design curriculum planning at Kansas City Art Institute and post-professional design education as a partner of McCoy & McCoy, and High Ground Tools and Strategies for Design. High Ground Design is a series of workshops created by Katherine and her husband, Michael McCoy for other professional designers to work in their studio. High Ground is dedicated to expanding design skills and methods, as well as opening up to the vision of design, questioning assumptions and redefining the nature of design.

== Awards ==
Design awards include the ID Magazine Annual Design Review, the AIGA Communication Graphics Show, the STA 100 Show, the Print Regional Design Annual, the Type Directors Club of New York TDC Show, the New York Art Directors Club One Show, the Society of Publication Designers, the Interiors Magazine 'I' Awards, and the Industrial Designers Society of America IDEA Awards". In 1999, she received the highest form of recognition for graphic design, the AIGA Medal.

- 1984- United States Presidential Design Awards
- 1987- Society of Typographic Arts Educator Award
- 1987- Joyce Hall Distinguished Professorship at Kansas City Art Institute
- 1988- United States Presidential Design Awards
- 1991- United States Presidential Design Awards
- 1994- Chrysler Award for Innovation in Design
- 1999- Medalist of the American Institute of Graphic Arts
- 2000- Industrial Designers Society of America Educators Award
- 2004- Honorary Doctorate from Kansas City Art Institute
- 2005- Design Minds Award by the Smithsonian Museum's National Design Awards

== Publications ==
- Cranbrook Design: The New Discourse

== See also ==
- List of AIGA medalists
