= Lausen (disambiguation) =

Lausen a city the canton of Basel-Country in Switzerland.

Lausen may also refer to:

- Lausen railway station, train station in Lausen, Switzerland
- Andreas Lausen (born 2002), Danish footballer
- Johan Lausen Bull (1751-1817), Norwegian jurist, politician and land owner
- Marcia Lausen (born 1959), American graphic designer and educator
