= Jennifer Morla =

American graphic designer

- Born: 1955 (age 70–71); New York City, U.S.
- Awards: Cooper Hewitt, Smithsonian Design Museum National Design Award (2017); AIGA Medal(2010)
- Website: www.morladesign.com

Jennifer Morla (born 1955, New York City) is an American graphic designer and professor based in San Francisco. She received AIGA Medal in 2010 and the Cooper Hewitt Smithsonian National Design Award in Communication Design in 2017.

== Early life and education ==
Morla attended the University of Hartford in Connecticut studying conceptual art before receiving her Bachelor of Fine Arts in Communication Design in 1978 from Massachusetts College of Art and Design in Boston, Massachusetts. She is also mother of 2 girls. Morla married Nilas de Matran, an architect.

She was influenced to undertake her career as an artist through visits to the MoMA growing up in Manhattan, seeing Charles and Ray Eames' IBM exhibit and films at the 1964 Worlds Fair, and her aunt's career as editor in the art department at Condé Nast.

== Career ==
=== Design work ===
After graduation in 1979, Morla was hired at PBS station KQED in San Francisco. Her job consisted of her designing on-air, print graphics and designing animated openings.

In 1981, she was hired as the head of the art department of Levi Strauss & Co. Her job was to design the store environment, logos, packaging, and labels for the brand advertising.

In 1984, she founded Morla Design. Clients include The New York Times, Levi Strauss & Co., Apple Computer, Herman Miller, Stanford University, and Luna Textiles. She has worked extensively with conceptual art venues designing identities, books and posters for The Mexican Museum, SculptureCenter, Capp Street Project, and New Langton Arts. In 1995, she created a poster celebrating the 20th anniversary of the San Francisco Mexican Museum entitled El Museo Mexicano. The piece featured vibrant colors, print and pattern as a way to pay tribute to the Mexican culture.

In 2000, Morla collaborated with Nordstrom creating a new face for the store's credit card to appeal to its consumers. The four holographic cards with vibrant colors and bold patterns reflected a reinvented version of the brand. In 2019, Morla worked with the brand K&M Confections, creating three different styles of the packaging for their milk chocolate flavors featuring the same typeface and foil lettering texture. Morla joined Design Within Reach in 2006 and developed campaigns emphasizing sustainability.

Morla is regularly invited to judge design competitions, for instance the Webby Awards. She's been a member of the Alliance Graphique Internationale (AGI) since 1998.

Her design work is featured in museums such as the SFMOMA and referenced in books such as Meggs' History of Graphic Design, Morla's work was the subject of a 2019 monograph titled Morla: Design, published by the San Francisco-based Letterform Archive.

=== Teaching ===
Since 1992 she has taught as an adjunct professor at California College of the Arts.

== Awards and recognition ==
- Cooper Hewitt, Communication Design, 2017
- AIGA Medal, for her "ability to surprise and inform through her poignant communication designs for global brands and arts institutions, and for instilling that skill in others through her teaching," 2010
- Her work for Design Within Reach received the AIGA Corporate Leadership Award in 2008

== Exhibitions and collections ==
=== Permanent collections ===
- MoMA
- San Francisco Museum of Modern Art
- Smithsonian American Art Museum
- Denver Art Museum
- Library of Congress
- Museum of Craft and Design

=== Solo exhibitions ===
- 2012, The Workshop Residence, San Francisco, CA. The Workshop Residence: Jennifer Morla Artist in Residence
- 2010, California College of the Arts, CCA, San Francisco, CA. Jennifer Morla: AIGA Medalist
- 1999, San Francisco Museum of Modern Art, San Francisco, CA. Jennifer Morla, Selections from the Permanent Collection
- 1999, K Kimpton Contemporary Art, San Francisco, CA. Jennifer Morla, Encaustic Works on Canvas
- 1996, Bedford Gallery, Walnut Creek, CA. Morla: Bay Area Portfolio
- 1994, DDD Design Gallery, Osaka, Japan. Jennifer Morla

=== Group exhibitions ===
- 2016, San Francisco Museum of Modern Art, San Francisco, CA. Typeface to Interface: Graphic Design from the Collection
- 2003, Museum of Art and Design, New York, NY. US Design 1975-2000
- 2002, Denver Art Museum, Denver, CO. US Design 1975-2000
- 1998, Smithsonian American Art Museum, Washington, D.C. Posters American Style
- 1985, Grand Palais, Paris, France. US Posters
- 1995, Brandenburg Art Gallery, Berlin. USA-Posters

== Works in publications ==
- The Designer’s Dictionary of Color, Sean Adams
- Meggs' History of Graphic Design (5th Edition), Alston Purvis
- The Poster: 1000 Posters from Toulouse-Lautrec to Sagmeister, Cees W. de Jong
- Launching the Imagination, Mary Stewart
- Glimmer: How Design Can Change Your Life, Warren Berger
- i-D, 2008
- Women of Design: Influence and Inspiration, Armin Vit & Bryony Gomez
- Teaching Graphic Design, Steven Heller
- Graphic Design America 3, Jenny Sullivan
- The New York Times Magazine
- Graphis Magazine
- Graphis Poster, Jennifer Morla foreword and introduction
- Communication Arts Magazine
- Women in Graphic Design, Gerda Breuer, Julia Meer
- HOW 15 Masters of Design: Jennifer Morla
- IDEA Magazine (Japan)
- Linea Graphica (Italy)
- A Diseño (Mexico)
- Novum (Germany)
