= Bea Feitler =

Brazilian designer and art director (1938–1982)

- Born: Beatriz Feitler; February 5, 1938; Rio de Janeiro, Brazil
- Died: April 8, 1982 (aged 44); Rio de Janeiro, Brazil
- Education: Parson's School of Design
- Occupations: Art director, Designer
- Known for: Harper's Bazaar, Ms.

Beatriz Feitler (February 5, 1938 – April 8, 1982) was a Brazilian designer and art director best known for her work in Harper's Bazaar, Ms., Rolling Stone and the premiere issue of the modern Vanity Fair.

== Early life, education and early career ==
Feitler was born in Rio de Janeiro in 1938, after her Jewish parents Rudi and Erna Feitler fled Nazi Germany. She spent most of her working life in the United States where she graduated from Parson's School of Design in New York City. She designed record jackets for Atlantic Records and London Records.

After her graduation in 1959, she returned to Brazil to study painting in Rio de Janeiro. In partnership with two other graphic designers Sérgio Jaguaribe (the cartoonist Jaguar) and Glauco Rodrigues, she started Estudio G, an art studio specializing in posters, album covers, and book design. Feitler worked in an advertising agency with for the progressive Senhor magazine.

Amongst her most important works of this period are the book covers made for Editora do Autor, a brief publishing enterprise of the authors Fernando Sabino and Rubem Braga.

== Harper's Bazaar ==
In 1961 Feitler returned to the United States where she was hired as an art assistant at Harper's Bazaar by her former teacher at Parsons, Marvin Israel, becoming co-art director of the magazine along with Ruth Ansel only two years later.

Feitler and Ansel's joint tenure at Harper's Bazaar created high quality design while responding to the political and cultural change of the 1960s. Feitler was often ahead of her time, in 1965 she and Richard Avedon used the first black model in a shoot for a major fashion magazine, leading to a public backlash, and loss of business. Black women would not begin to be regularly featured in the magazine for several years after Feitler.

"Her keen aesthetic judgement was appreciated and respected by her peers – and especially by the photographers. In a 1968 Graphics article Richard Avedon recalled the close creative collaboration of the two young women designers for the cover of the April 1965 issue of Bazaar." The final cover of a pink space helmet won an ADC medal.

== Later career ==
In 1972, Feitler left Harper's Bazaar and joined Gloria Steinem to launch Ms. magazine, where she would remain until 1974. She was the first art director at Ms. magazine where she created an experimental look using day-glo inks and mixtures of photography, illustration, and typographic compositions.

Between 1974 and 1980 Feitler started teaching design classes at the School of Visual Arts (SVA) and worked on several freelance projects like posters and costumes for the Alvin Ailey Dance Company, ad campaigns for Christian Dior, Diane von Furstenberg, Bill Haire and Calvin Klein, and record jackets including the album Black and Blue by the Rolling Stones. In 1975, thanks to the insistence of Annie Leibovitz, Feitler started working for Rolling Stone, beginning her six-year association with the magazine which would lead her to redesigning its format twice.

== Illness and death ==
Feitler's final project was the premiere issue of the revived Vanity Fair. At that time she had undergone surgery and chemotherapy to treat a rare form of cancer and had been undergoing chemotherapy for several months already. Feitler died April 8, 1982, before the issue was published.

== See also ==
- Art Directors Club Hall of Fame
- List of AIGA medalists
