= Rick Griffith =

Letterpress master and graphic designer

Ricardo "Rick" Griffith (born 1969) is a British graphic designer and letterpress printmaker of West Indian descent. One of Griffith's best-known contributions to letterpress printmaking is annotation, and his most famed work is the poster “Introductory Ethic for Designers.” Griffith was Print magazine's first artist-in-residence. He owns and operates MATTER, a design studio, typography laboratory, and design bookstore, which was the first Black-owned bookstore in Colorado. Griffith founded the Black Astronaut Research Project (BLARP.org). As a designer, art director, master letterpress printmaker, writer, curator, educator, lecturer, and activist, Griffith works to create and disseminate graphics geared towards dismantling white supremacy and racism in the interest of reparative justice.

He lives in Denver, Colorado, USA, where he was the City Commissioner for Public Art and Culture.

== Biography ==
Griffith was born the UK, raised in Southeast London, and educated at Colfe’s College, Sidcup, United Kingdom. He immigrated to the United States in the late 1980s, and attended West Springfield High School, Fairfax County, VA.

Immersed in the Washington, DC, punk rock scene, Griffith worked in a record store. There, he first encountered Sound-on-Sound, by the group Bill Nelson's Red Noise. Inspired by the font used on their album cover, Griffith found his way into graphic design. A freelance career on Madison Avenue funded his first practice, RGD (Rick Griffith Design). With his partner, Debra Johnson, Griffith founded MATTER in Denver, Colorado, which, over the last two decades, has grown into a design consultancy, print shop, workshop and Denver's only black-owned retail bookstore.

== Residencies, exhibitions, and awards ==
Griffith's work is in the permanent collections of the Museum of Contemporary Art in Denver, the Denver Art Museum, the Butler Library of Rare Books and Manuscripts at Columbia University, the Tweed Museum of Art at the University of Minnesota, Duluth, the Western New York Book Art Collaborative] (WNYBAC); and Columbia College's Center for the Book in Chicago, Boulder Museum of Contemporary Art, and at AIGA New York.

Griffith has been a member of the American Institute of Graphic Arts since 1994 and served as president of the Colorado Chapter from 1995 to 1998, continuing to serve on their advisory board through 2006. He served on the Denver City and County Cultural Commission from 2012 to 2016, and on the Board of Directors for the Alliance for Contemporary Art at the Denver Art Museum. He was inducted into the International Academy of Digital Arts and Sciences in 2001 and presently serves as the Services Nominating Chair.

In December 2020, Griffith was named Print magazine's first artist-in-residence, during which he wrote a column, Processing. Griffith twice chaired the national AIGA Design Conference. He also has been a judge for the Cooper Hewitt, Smithsonian Design Museum's National Design Awards.

Griffith was awarded an Honorary Doctorate of Humane Letters at the Art Institute of Chicago; received the Denver One Club Award in 2017 and 2018; the Type Directors Club award in 2004, was included in HOW magazine's International Posters edition in 2004, and received Print magazine regional awards in 2000, 2001, 2002, 2003, 2004, 2008, and 2009; won AIGA's 50 Books/50 Covers competition in 2004; and was awarded the Belmar Award for Achievement in Art and Design in 2004.

Griffith has lectured widely and worked as a visiting professor at the University of Louisville Hite Art Institute, University of Southern California Roski School of Design, Montana State University, South Dakota State University, University of Texas, Austin, University of Minnesota, Duluth, and the Hamilton Wood Type and Printing Museum. He has served as an adjunct professor at the University of Denver, University of Colorado, Denver, and has been a visiting artist at the Rocky Mountain College of Art and Design and the Academy of Arts, Architecture and Design in Prague, and the 2022–2023 Roy Acuff Chair of Excellence at Austin Peay State University.
