= Ann Willoughby =

American graphic designer

- Born: 1946 (age 79–80); Jackson, Mississippi
- Education: University of Southern Mississippi
- Awards: AIGA medal in 2014
- Website: https://willoughbydesign.com/

Ann Willoughby (born 1946) is an American graphic designer and founder of Willoughby Design Group (formerly Ann Willoughby & Associates) based in Kansas City, Missouri.

== Biography ==
Willoughby was born in 1946 in Jackson, Mississippi. She attended the University of Southern Mississippi and received her Bachelor of Fine Arts degree in Fine Art and Design in 1968.

In 1972, she met Milton Glaser at the Aspen Design Conference. Glaser encouraged her to continue in the profession despite her intention to quit. In 1974, she started a small design business, which allowed her time with her family and to pursue her professional endeavors. She also attracted women looking for the flexibility to accommodate life with children, which was uncommon at the time.

In 1978, she founded Ann Willoughby & Associates (now Willoughby Design Group) in Kansas City, where she has worked with Lee Jeans, Einstein Bros. Bagels, and Hallmark. Her firm still supports young female designers and has worked on various design initiatives.

Willoughby received an American Institute of Graphic Arts (AIGA) medal in 2014. She was the first in the association’s Kansas City chapter to receive the medal.

== Willoughby Design Group ==
=== History ===
Ann Willoughby & Associates, now Willoughby Design, was founded in 1978 in Kansas City. In 2003 her firm redesigned public transportation in Kansas City. Her firm has worked with many clients, such as Interstate Brands Corporation, H&R Block, and Lee Apparel Company. They design ads, sales materials, and annual reports. They have also created ads, logos, and packaging for J.E. Dunn Construction Company, the Country Club Plaza, and Farm to Market Bread Company.

In 1989, the annual revenue was less than $500,000. Willoughby sold 70 percent of her company to LPK in 1989, one of the country's top 10 packaging design firms. After five years, LPK sold the interests back. In 1996, the firm saw an increased revenue of about $1.7 million.

One of her most recognizable works was her firm's design for the Bagel & Bagel chain of restaurants, first opening in 1987. The design survived a merger in 1995 with three other regional bakeries. They also launched a new coffee identity for Bagel & Bagel and continued to do more identity and packaging projects.

=== Clients ===
Numerous clients of Willoughby Design include civic and non-profit organizations, corporate health and wellness products, restaurants, and shops. The business provides a range of services, including brand development, promotions, consumer goods, digital, environmentally friendly packaging, and video.

==== Non-profits ====
Willoughby Design has created campaigns for Design Industries Foundation Fighting AIDS (DIFFA), Deliver Now for Women and Children, and American Institute of Graphic Arts Get Out The Vote. In 2012, Willoughby's partner Zack Shubkagel served as the National Chair for the Get Out the Vote project by the American Institute of Graphic Arts and designed displays in Kansas City and at New York City's National American Institute of Graphic Arts offices.

==== Corporate ====
Corporate clients have included brand systems for veterinary companies, Neenah Paper, and health and wellness companies.

==== Packaging ====
Willoughby Design has created packaging solutions for Hershey's, Williams Sonoma, and Panera, among others.
