= Ruth Ansel =

American graphic designer

- Born: 1938; New York, New York, U.S.
- Education: Alfred University
- Occupation: Ruth Ansel Design
- Awards: Gold Medal of Design, 1970, The Art Directors Club AIGA Medal, 2016

Ruth Ansel (born 1938) is an American graphic designer and art director. She became a co-art director of Harper's Bazaar in the 1960s alongside Bea Feitler. In the 1970s she was art director of The New York Times Magazine and in the 1980s House & Garden, Vanity Fair, and Vogue. She was the first woman to hold these positions. In 2016, Ansel was awarded the AIGA Medal for her visionary contributions to American graphic design.

== Biography ==
Ansel was born in and grew up in The Bronx, New York, where according to her, there "wasn’t much to do except dream of getting out." She attended the High School of Music and Art in Manhattan.

After graduating with a Fine Arts degree from Alfred University in 1957, she started working under Bob Cato at Columbia Records. She married designer Bob Gill who introduced her to the "New York Design Mafia" — George Lois, Robert Brownjohn, Saul Bass, and Ivan Chermayeff — but the couple later split.

In 1961, Ansel started working at Harper's Bazaar in the Art Department, which at the time was under the directorship of Marvin Israel. Under Israel, she developed a critical eye and to create tension on the page. In 1963, Israel was fired after a falling out with editor-in-chief, Nancy White, Ruth Ansel and Bea Feitler became co-art directors of Harper's Bazaar; they were among the youngest art directors in the history of magazines. It was in collaboration with Bea Feitler and Richard Avedon that Ruth Ansel produced the now iconic April 1965 cover of Jean Shrimpton with a winking eye and a bright pink "helmet" that was cut and pasted from day-glo paper. In 1974, she left Harper's to become the first female art director of The New York Times Magazine. In 1983, she revamped House & Garden and in the 1984 joined Vanity Fair as art director. Ansel has collaborated for over four decades with photographers, illustrators and artists such as Richard Avedon, Andy Warhol, Peter Beard, Bruce Weber and Annie Leibovitz.

In 1992, Ansel opened her own design studio where she continues to produce groundbreaking content today. In the past she designed the Dark Odyssey by Phillip Jones Griffiths, The Sixties by Richard Avedon, Women and The White Oak Dance Project by Annie Leibovitz. She has also produced ad campaigns for Versace, Club Monaco, and Karl Lagerfeld. Current projects include a book for photographer Jerry Schatzberg and a book on the life and work of jewelry designer Elsa Peretti.

== Legacy ==
In 2008, the Wolfsonian-FIU organized an exhibition titled, The Thoughts on Democracy: Reinterpreting Norman Rockwell’s Four Freedoms. Ansel was one of 55 leading designers invited to contribute a poster based on the "Four Freedoms" posters created in 1943 by American illustrator Norman Rockwell. In 2009 she was invited to present her work at Moderna Museet in Stockholm, Sweden. In 2010, as the first book of the Hall of Femmes series, Hall of Femmes: Ruth Ansel was published. A book designed by Hjarta Smarta, highlighting her forty-year career and taking a look at what it was like to be the first woman in these positions. In 2011, Ansel was the recipient of the Art Director's Club prestigious Hall of Fame Award.

== Awards ==
- The Gold Medal for Design, The Art Directors Clubs, 1970
- Design Award for Continuing Excellence in Publication Design by the Society of Publication (Special Tribute)
- Hall of Fame Award, The Art Directors Club, 2011
- AIGA Medalist, 2016
