= Henrietta Condak =

American graphic designer

Henrietta Condak is an American graphic designer and design educator. She is noted for the use of historic references in her design work for CBS Records.

== Early life ==
Condak was born in New York City. After graduating from Cooper Union, Condak began her career at Esquire Magazine. Initially, she worked for GQ (Gentlemen's Quarterly), also published by Esquire, Inc., but later advanced to Esquire's promotion department. She left the magazine in 1958 to tour Italy with her soon-to-be husband, the illustrator Cliff Condak.

== Career ==
=== CBS Records ===
Condak accepted a design position creating album cover designs for Columbia Records in 1963. There she worked for art directors Bob Cato and John Berg, who was also a Cooper Union graduate. In 1965 she became one of the first women to be nominated for a Grammy in the category of Best Classical Album Cover. She received a second Grammy nomination in 1968 for the design of Haydn: Symphony No. 84 in E Flat Major / Symphony No. 85 in B Flat Major ("La Reine").

Condak was eventually promoted to senior art director for Columbia Masterworks where she designed hundreds of classical music albums. She commissioned cover art work from her husband as well as a number of other notable illustrators including Milton Glaser, David Levine, David Wilcox and Robert Weaver. Condak also created typographic covers. Her designs for a series of 100 reissues of the Great Performances series used a common set of five vintage wood typefaces. In 1980, along with Lou Dorfsman, John Berg and illustrator Gerard Huerta, she developed a logo for the label's rebranding to CBS Records Masterworks.

Design historian Philip Meggs, writing about graphic design at CBS Records, describes Condak's classical album covers as "romantic and esthetic enchantment". Other designers at CBS during Condak's tenure included Carin Goldberg and Paula Scher. Goldberg credits Condak as a leader in using historical vernacular for album cover design. Both women recognize Condak as an important mentor in their careers.

=== Later career ===
In 1984, Condak left CBS to open her own design studio. She continued to create album covers for clients that included Nonesuch and Elektra Records. In addition, she re-entered the realm of publishing, designing for Random House, Simon & Schuster, Business Week, Sports Illustrated, and the New York Times, among others.

In addition to her professional design work, Condak taught at the School of Visual Arts for more than 30 years.

== Awards and recognition ==
Condak's album cover designs have received awards from Communication Arts and AIGA, the American Institute of Graphic Arts. Her 1964 album cover for Strauss: Also Sprach Zarathustra and her 1967 album cover for Haydn: Symphony No 84 In E Flat Major And Symphony No. 85 In B Flat Major La Reine received Grammy Award nominations for Best Album Cover.
