= J. Thomson Willing =

John Thomson Willing (August 5, 1860 – July 8, 1947) was an American artist and author. Born in Toronto, he trained as a lithographer at the Ontario School of Art.

Willing was the art director of Metropolitan Magazine. In 1906, he was the art manager of Associated Sunday Magazines. In 1897 Willing was elected to the Salmagundi Club New York as an Artist member. During World War I, he was in charge of pictorial publicity in the Bureau of Information. His publicity work made events such as the Salvation Army Drive, the Campaign for the Relief of Armenia and the Near East, and the Methodist Centenary Drive successful. In 1915, he was the editor of Every Week until 1918 when it folded. He was art director of Gravure Service Corporation until his retirement in 1942.

He was a member of the Royal Canadian Academy of Arts (RCA) from 1886 to 1888. He was a charter member of the American Institute of Graphic Arts (AIGA) and its first treasurer. In 1921, he was elected as co-vice president of the AIGA and served until 1924 and was awarded the AIGA medal in 1935.

== Works ==
- Dames of high degree: being portraits after English masters, with decorations and biographical notes, 1895
- Some old time beauties: after portraits by the English masters, with embellishment and comment, 1895
- Beautiful women in art, 1913
