= James Biber =

American architect

James Biber is an American architect and partner at the firm Biber Architects, based in New York. He was a partner at design firm Pentagram between 1991–2010.

== Early life and education ==
Biber was born in New Rochelle, New York. He attended Cornell University where he studied biology before graduating with a degree in architecture in 1976. Upon graduation Biber received the Matthew DelGaudio Award in total design and the Shreve Fund Award, as well as the James Eidlitz Traveling Fellowship, on which he traveled in Europe for 6 months.

== Career ==
Biber spent his early career at Paul Segal Associates, becoming senior associate and leaving in 1984 to establish his own practice. Biber's firm practiced in a studio that included Carin Goldberg, a graphic designer whom he married in 1987, and designer Gene Greif.

In 1991, the design firm Pentagram invited Biber to join as a partner in the New York office as the first architect in that office. Biber designed Pentagram's former office at 204 Fifth Avenue. He left the company in October 2010 to establish his own New York-based studio, Biber Architects. 2022 book Pentagram: Living By Design cited financial difficulties, notably disparities between project timelines in graphic design and architecture, as the primary reason for Biber's departure.

=== Notable buildings and projects ===
Biber described his work as the "Architecture of Identity." He designed the USA Pavilion for Expo Milano 2015. Biber's career has also included the design of the Harley-Davidson Museum in Milwaukee, 2008; oceanfront houses in Montauk, NY; a restoration of the 1934 Sten-Frenke house in Santa Monica, by Richard Neutra; along with projects at Celebration, Florida; store, suites and lounges in the Arizona Cardinals Football Stadium (by Peter Eisenman) in Phoenix, Arizona; and headquarters for the Muzak corporation in Fort Mill, South Carolina.

He designed the Needle and Button kiosk for the Fashion Center BID in New York's fashion district; a pop-up restaurant for the James Beard Foundation, JBF LTD; the Public Gallery at the Koch Institute for Integrative Cancer Research; the Visitor Center for Philip Johnson's Glass House in New Canaan, CT; sets for The Daily Show with Jon Stewart; the Macaulay Honors College at CUNY; and the JEHT Foundation headquarters.

== Gallery ==
Selected works by James Biber
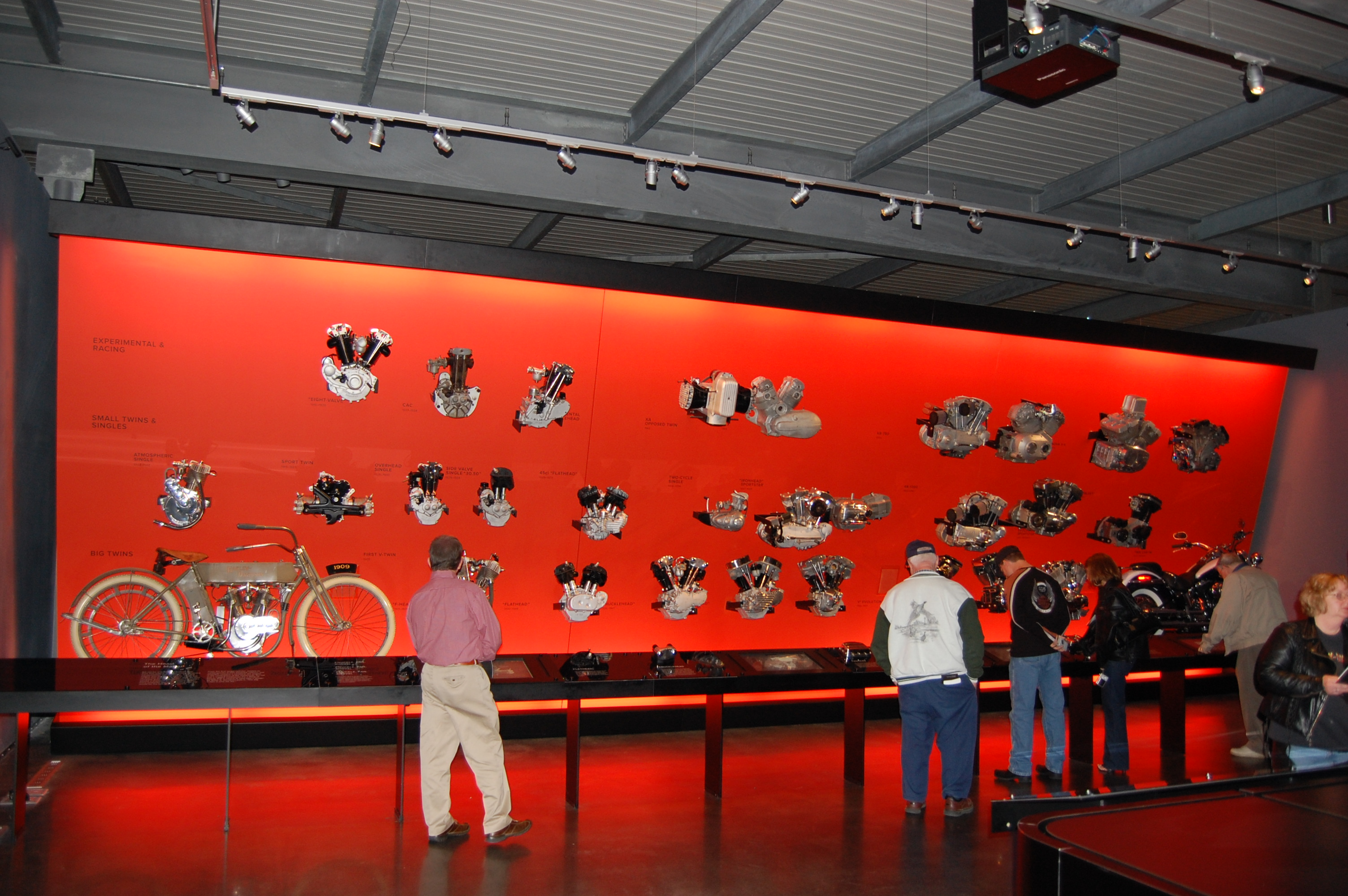
Harley-Davidson Museum in Milwaukee, 2008

Swatch retail store in Midtown Manhattan, 1996

Pentagram New York office

== Publications ==
Biber's work has appeared in numerous books and articles including Houses of the Hamptons by Paul Goldberger, "Restaurants that Work" by Martin Dorf, articles in The New York Times, The New York Times Magazine, New York Magazine, Architect, Architectural Record, Blueprint, Metropolis, Metropolitan Home, Interiors, Interior Design, I.D., Fast Company, Business Week, The Wall Street Journal, Wallpaper and dozens of other international publications. His work is featured in 3 of the books on Pentagram, Pentagram: the Compendium, Pentagram Book Five and Profile: Pentagram Design as well as in Pentagram Paper 38: The Russian Garbo.

== Awards and recognition ==
James Biber was elected to the American Institute of Architects College of Fellows in 2004. A member of the AIA, NCARB, US Green Building Council, The Architectural League, The Storefront for Art and Architecture and other professional design organizations. He has received awards recognizing his projects from the AIA, SEGD, AIGA, Business Week IDEA Awards. James Biber is a LEED accredited professional (LEED AP).
