= Carl Purington Rollins =

American graphic designer

Carl Purington Rollins (1880 — November 20, 1960) was an American master printer at Yale University Press, graphic designer, author, and educator.

== Early life and education ==
Carl Purington Rollins was born in West Newbury, Massachusetts, in 1880 and entered the profession of printing in high school. In 1897, he attended Harvard University. After graduation in 1900, he started his career in printing at the Georgetown Advocate and Carl Heintzemann Press in Boston. In 1915, he married Margaret Dickey.

== Career ==
In 1903, Rollins joined a rural monastic-centered Arts and Crafts utopian community, New Clairvaux, in Montague, Massachusetts but stayed only one year after losing sight in one eye. At New Clairvaux, Rollins taught a printing course in the community's school and ran the New Clairvaux Press. After leaving the community, he toured and bicycled through Europe, and broadened the knowledge of his craft. The community failed in 1908 and was purchased by Dyke Mill where Rollins in turn purchased and established an arts and crafts cooperative, making and selling furniture, textiles, and printed works. In 1918, Rollins joined the staff of the Yale University Press after letterpress printing waned at Dyke Mill and in 1920 was appointed Printer to the University. He also taught a course titled “Eighteenth-Century Printing Office Practice” and established the Bibliographical Press in the University library for student use. As Printer to the University, he produced 8,000 pieces of ephemera and 2,000 volumes and created the modern design of bibliographies and footnotes.

Rollins was the editor of the Saturday Review of Literature and contributed to various publications and authored books including B.R., America's Typographic Playboy about Bruce Rodgers.

Rollins won the American Institute of Graphic Arts (AIGA) Medal in 1941 for printing excellence. In 1948, he retired from Yale University and was named Printer Emeritus with the president of Yale at the time, Dr. Charles Seymour saying his achievements "have placed him in the top rank of America's typographical artists." In 1949, The American Institute of Graphic Arts and the Grolier Club of New York put on a joint exhibit of his work and received the honorary degree of Doctor of Human Letters from Yale.

He died in New Haven, Connecticut on November 20, 1960.

== Bibliography ==
- B.R., America's Typographic Playboy, Carl Purington Rollins (1927)
- The Physiology of the Book, Carl Purington Rollins (1946)
- American Type Designers and Their Work, Carl Purington Rollins (1947)
- American Type Designers and Their Work, Carl Purington Rollins (1948)
- Graphic Forms: The Arts as Related to the Book, György Kepes, Paul Rand, Carl Purington Rollins, Samuel Chamberlain (1949) Yale University Press
