= Hall of Femmes =

Swedish art project

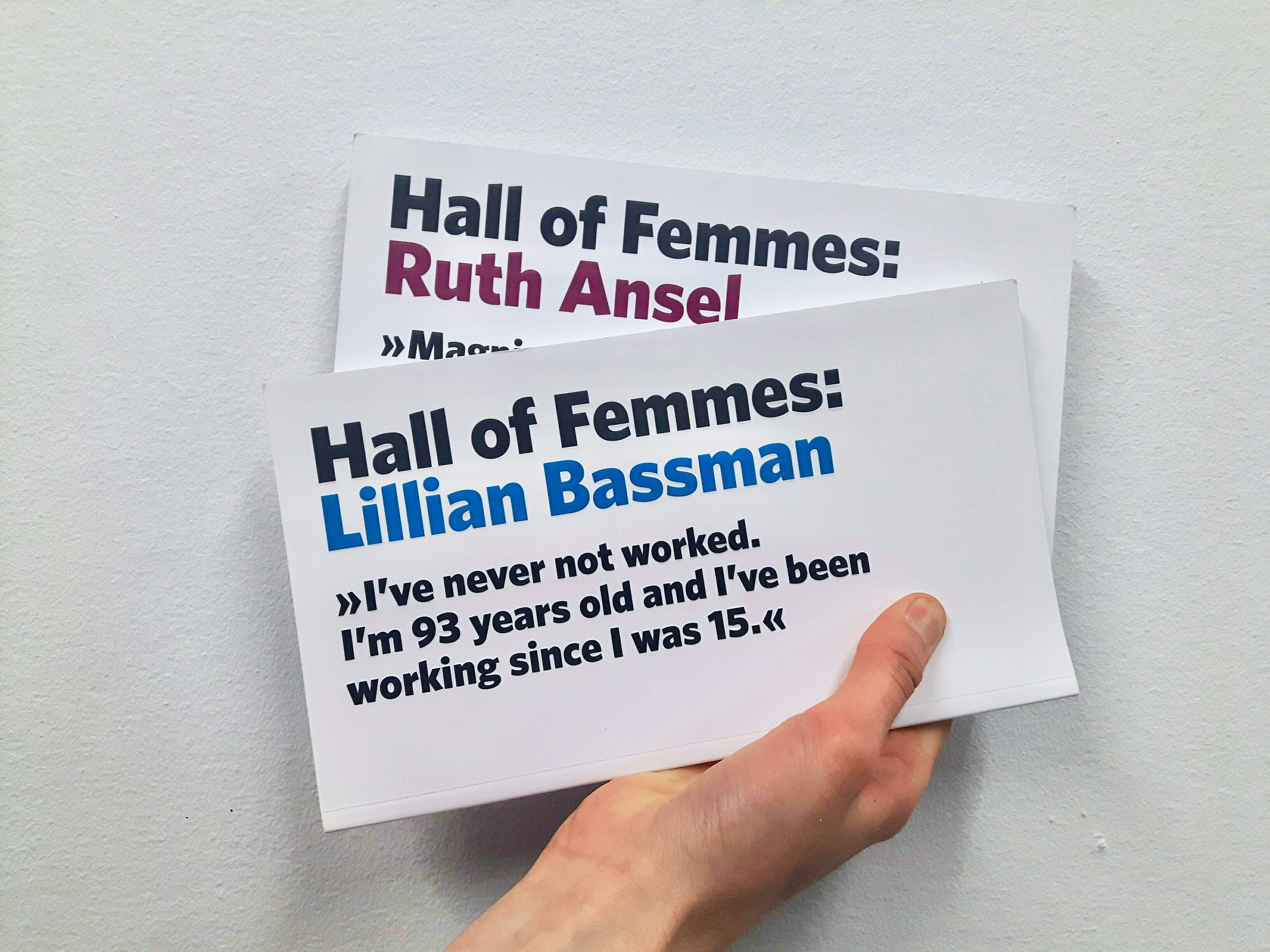
Two books from the Hall of Femmes collection

Hall of Femmes is a project, based in Sweden, aiming to highlight the work of women in art direction and design. The designers Samira Bouabana and Angela Tillman Sperandio founded the project in 2009 with the intention to revise design history by paying tribute to the women who made contributions to the field without due recognition. The Hall of Femmes book series where eight female pioneers in graphic design are portrayed. The project also includes seminars, screenings, talks, exhibitions and podcasts. Hall of Femmes also seeks to inspire to a more equal industry and contribute to the future of the design scene. The business is widely established both in Sweden and internationally, and has been mentioned in notable magazines like the New York Times Magazine as well as Creative Review and Vanity Fair.

In May 2013 Hall of Femmes organized Design Talks, a two-day conference at the Museum of Modern Art in Stockholm, where top names in the world of design, fashion, art, communication and architecture were invited to talk. Amongst the international speakers were Ruth Ansel, Barbara Kruger, Penny Martin, Janet Froelich and Cindy Gallop.

In 2013, Hall of Femmes received the Bengt Hanser Award, presented by the Swedish Association of Communication Agencies.

== List of Hall of Femmes books ==
- Barbara Stauffacher Solomon, I broke all the rules
- Janet Froelich, I love the hunt for the story, the thread of the narrative
- Lella Vignelli, My ideas are always clear
- Tomoko Miho, Good design is about finding solutions
- Paula Scher, Style changes, technology changes, but people never change
- Lillian Bassman, I've never not worked. I'm 93 years old and I've been working since I was 15
- Carin Goldberg, Think. Look. Listen. Ask question. Have fun. Assume nothing
- Ruth Ansel, Magpie aesthetic*, shameless borrower, intuitive, and deceptively simple
