= Norman T.A. Munder =

American printer

Norman Thompson Aeisler Munder (1867 – April 27, 1953) was a printer and typographer, and a pioneer in modern printing.

== Printing History ==
Norman Munder and his company, Norman T.A. Munder & Co., of Baltimore, was well respected and won numerous awards. The Maryland Room at the Enoch Pratt Free Library holds over ten boxes of his prints. Among other firms, he printed for advertisers such as Alexander Brothers and was a contributor to "PM" magazine. He received the international award for color printing and black-and-white Halftone at the San Francisco Exposition in 1915. In a 1920 Printing exhibition, he won the gold medal award - the highest award available, from the American Institute of Graphic Arts. And in the same year, he co-authored the "Report of First Meeting and Dinner, Tendered to the Apprentices by the Typothetae of Washington, D.C." In 1920, he was awarded the first AIGA medal.

Norman's designs for printed books (and books on printing), poetry broadsides, maps, pamphlets, reproduced etchings, historical documents, greeting cards, and other ephemera, are numerous and well documented on the internet, in bookstores and libraries. His publications include a book on the origin of the alphabet, a treatise on the Japanese cherry trees of Washington, and a book on William Henry Rinehart, the Baltimore sculptor. He also printed the first book of Gulliver's Travels for the Limited Editions Club, and in 1925 he wrote and published Advertising of Truth.

In 1929, L.J. Hawley wrote A Man Named Munder, an unofficial biography, printed by Munder & Co. And during his lifetime, the Baltimore Sun gave him a tribute regarding the decision of who should print L.C. Wroth's manuscript of A History of Printing in Colonial Maryland (a definitive study of the origins of letterpress craftsmanship), the job being given to Munder & Co.:

"...Mr Munder printed more books than anyone has counted...it was never in his nature to treat any book cavalierly. It was his habit to regard a manuscript as an achievement and an opportunity for artistic embellishment. Mr Munder went on to undertake commissions for millionaires, art collectors, schools, libraries and museums. His reproductions and type arrangements were marvels of taste and clarity; his attention to the finer points of binding and paper was no less meticulous."

Munder also designed the Munder frame — a special frame that holds printed poetry (sixteen prints at a time), so any poem in the frame can be moved to the front, while all the poems behind are still contained.

A 1940 Baltimore Sun article by Amy Grief describes "a visit to his large, sunny office, situated conveniently near the print shop, where he can hear the sond of his beloved presses and be accessible to anyone who comes to him for advice, reveals a small, rubicund cheerful man with white hair, keen blue eyes and a general Pickwickian air... very genial, very approachable, very kindly."

== Early life ==
Munder was born on Lombard Street. His German-born father, Charles Munder, was Maryland's first preserve and candy-maker. Norman and his two brothers, Charles and Wilmer, played in the St Paul's Burying Ground at Lombard and Fremont Streets. When he was seven, an advertisement of a small printing press for sale attracted the boys' attention and they scraped enough money together to buy it. From that moment on, to all purposes, they were in the printing business and made visiting cards, delivering them by wagon and billygoat.

By that time having lost their father, their mother, Priscilla Price Munder (a woman known for her pious life and good works), took them to buy their first real printing press, which ran faithfully until it was destroyed in the Baltimore Fire of 1904. In 1878, the Munder Brothers opened their first shop on Baltimore Street, near Calvert. After school and on weekends they worked their "mule-powered" printers (not yet steam-treadled) and despite the fact that Norman's two fingers got caught and were cut off below the nails by the new printer the first day it arrived, the business thrived and began to take on seriously large orders from a North Carolina tobacco firm and the B&O Railroad, which wanted updated timetables continuously printed.

== Business Growth ==
About this time, Mr. Munder began to think of printing in terms of beauty. He wanted more artistic work and saw a market for it. Moving to Water Street, the Munders, eight employees, and six treadle presses, turned out 1,000 impressions an hour. With the advancement of gas engines, it meant that the foot-power printing press was over. Companies were ordering work which Norman could use his creativity and originality to the fullest.

National recognition came with two carloads of books for a paper house, showing samples of fine papers and how they could be printed—and was accomplished by Norman alone. Though this was done in 1905, the book is still used today by publishers and printers. Afterwards, orders came in from the Library of Congress, the Boston Museum of Fine Arts, J.F. Morgan, John D. Rockefeller, and major institutions wanting catalogues and reproductions. His work closely approximates the quality of the "Old Masters." Etching reproductions were a specialty by the Munders, and it is almost impossible to tell a Munder reproduction from an original etching. Recognition included great friends like Frederic Goudy and Bruce Rogers, two of the most famous type designers and typographers in America.

== Retirement ==
After his retirement in 1931, he became advisory printing councilor to the Enoch Pratt Free Library and in 1935, the Library of Congress again asked him to reproduce more work—this time the Declaration of Independence and the Constitution of the United States. Since he could not work from the originals, they gave him 30-year-old photographs, with many words and letters missing from the aging of the film. He saw the beauty and impressiveness of the originals documents and felt that a print made from the photographs would be a sacrilege, so he commissioned a fine letterer, who had been in his employ, to supply the missing letters and words. He also removed the smears and blotches caused by the film and thus was able to bring out entirely perfect reproductions of both historical documents. Copies of these are in great demand.

"If you take a Corot, unframed, through the subways," says Mr. Munder, "you couldn't sell it for $2. Put it in a plush-walled room, properly framed, tag it for $10,000, and your chances are much better." That is his typical understanding (of quality presentations) and helps to explain what made him one of the most distinguished printers in the country and a collaborator with the best of the American artists, designers and typographers.

Norman married Elizabeth "Bessie" Riefle (of the Baltimore Coulson/Riefle family), and they were the parents of two daughters. Bessie died in childbirth.

Munder died on April 27, 1953, at the Masonic Home in Cockeysville. He was buried in Green Mount Cemetery.
