= Carin Goldberg =

American graphic designer (1953–2023)

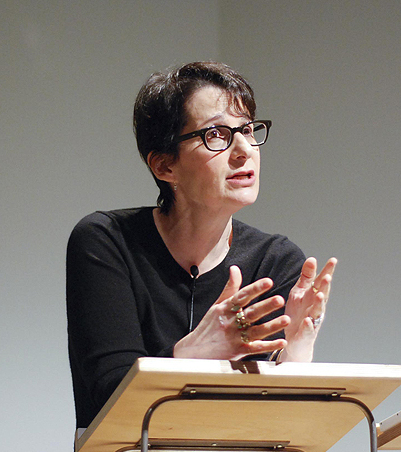
- Goldberg at AIGA lecture in 2011
- Born: June 12, 1953; New York City, U.S.
- Died: January 19, 2023 (aged 69); Stanfordville, New York
- Education: Cooper Union, 1975
- Occupation: Graphic designer
- Notable credit(s): Album and book covers
- Spouse: James Biber (m. 1987)
- Website: www.caringoldberg.com

Carin Goldberg (June 12, 1953 – January 19, 2023) was an American graphic designer, publication designer and brand consultant. She was known for her cover designs for record albums and books, with her work appearing in and on the covers of the New York Times Book Review, the New York Times Magazine, New York Magazine, The Atlantic Monthly, and Wired. Her use of visual historical references generated controversy within the graphic design community.

== Early life and education ==
Carin Goldberg was born in New York City on June 12, 1953, and grew up in Long Island and New Jersey. She graduated from the Cooper Union in 1975 with a BFA in painting.

== Career ==
After graduating from Cooper Union and encouraged by the school's director of alumni relations, Marilyn Hoffner, Goldberg met with alumni Lou Dorfsman at CBS and worked up a series of logos for him. Dorfsman hired her as a junior designer where she began her career in the corporate design department of CBS Television in 1977. There she gained an appreciation of finely tuned typography. She moved on to Columbia Records in 1979 and worked with former classmate Gene Greif, as well as Paula Scher, Henrietta Condak, and John Berg. There, along with Scher and others, she found inspiration in early 20th-century graphics and began to incorporate historical references into her work.

In 1982, Goldberg started her own firm, Carin Goldberg Design. She continued to work for record label clients, but also sought out book design assignments. Her projects included the design for Madonna's 1983 self-titled debut album. Her work on the cover for the 1986 Vintage Books edition of James Joyce's Ulysses placed her in the midst of the 1980s fight over appropriation. The tilted lettering and large initial caps in Goldberg's design for the Ulysses cover bore strong similarities to a 1928 poster by Paul Renner. Philip Meggs praised her in his 1989 essay "The Women Who Saved New York!" for using historical styles in contemporary design, while Tibor Kalman vilified her for practicing "jive modernism" in his 1991 Print essay "Good History/Bad History."

In 1983, Goldberg began teaching graphic design at the School of Visual Arts. She was made a member of the Alliance Graphique Internationale in 1998. She was named a Graphis Master by Graphis Inc. From 2006 to 2008, she served as president of the American Institute of Graphic Arts (AIGA) New York Chapter.

In 2008, she was honored by the Art Directors Club for her work in education. In 2009, she received the AIGA Medal for her contributions to the field of graphic design. Her alma mater bestowed her with the Augustus Saint-Gaudens Award in 2012. Goldberg won the Cynthia Hazen Polsky and Leon Polsky Rome Prize for Design in 2014.

Goldberg's designs have been included in museum exhibits, including Graphic Design in America at the Walker Art Center (1989) and Mixing Messages at the Cooper Hewitt, Smithsonian Design Museum (1996). She was the subject of the book Hall of Femmes: Carin Goldberg for the Hall of Femmes project in 2009.

== Personal life ==
Goldberg died in her home in Stanfordville, New York, of a glioblastoma brain tumor, according to her husband, James Biber.

== Awards ==
- 2008 Art Directors Club of New York Grandmasters Award for Excellence in Education
- 2009 AIGA Medal
- 2012 Cooper Union Augustus Saint-Gaudens Award
- 2014 Cynthia Hazen Polsky and Leon Polsky Rome Prize for Design
- 2015 American Academy in Rome fellow in Design, Rome Prize

== Exhibitions ==
- 1989 Walker Art Center, "Graphic Design in America"
- 1996 Cooper Hewitt, Smithsonian Design Museum, "Mixing Messages"
