= Noreen Morioka =

American graphic designer (born 1965)

Noreen Morioka (born 1965) is an American graphic designer and co-founder of AdamsMorioka. She is recognized for her distinct California-influenced approach to visual communications. In 2014, the American Institute of Graphic Arts (AIGA) awarded the AIGA Medal to Morioka and her business partner Sean Adams for their contributions to graphic design. At present, she is Chief Creative Officer at The New Computer Corporation and frequently serves as competition juror and lecturer.

== Personal life ==
Morioka was born in Sunnyvale and lives in Venice, California with her wife, Nicole Jacek.

== Career ==
Morioka met her future business partner, Sean Adams, while attending CalArts in the 1980s. After graduation, Morioka moved to Tokyo where she worked for Landor Associates. In the 1990s, she returned to California and re-connected with Adams. Together they formed AdamsMorioka in 1994, a Los Angeles-based design firm. Their clients included Adobe, Gap, Disney, Nickelodeon and Rizzoli. The agency's style was marked by “eye-popping graphics and tongue-in-cheek wit” according to author Alissa Walker. After 22 years of AdamsMorioka, the partners closed the agency to pursue other interests. After AdamsMorioka, she joined Tatcha, a skincare company in San Francisco, as Chief Creative Officer. In 2018, she joined Wieden + Kennedy to co-lead their design team, working with clients such as Nike, Converse, and Airbnb. She then moved to Netflix, where she was the Director of Global Brand Design. Currently, she is Chief Creative Officer at The New Computer Corporation.

Morioka served as president of AIGA's Los Angeles chapter from 2000 to 2002 and again from 2012 to 2014. She was chair of the AIGA's National Presidents Council, was a Fellow of the International Design Conference at Aspen, and was Chair of the James Beard Foundation Award for Design and Architecture. Currently, she is on the board of directors at the Art Directors Club (ADC).

Morioka frequently acts as competition juror and lecturer.

== Publications ==
While at AdamsMorioka, Morioka is credited with authoring several books along with Sean Adams and Terry Stone.

- Logo Design Workbook: A Hands-On Guide to Creating Logos, Noreen Morioka Sean Adams, Terry Stone. 2006.
- Color Design Workbook: A Real-world Guide to Using Color in Graphic Design, Noreen Morioka Sean Adams, Terry Stone. 2008.

== Awards and honors ==
The San Francisco Museum of Modern Art held a solo retrospective of AdamsMorioka's work in 2000. The firm's work is also included in the museum's permanent collection. Her books are held in the Library of Congress.

In 2006, Morioka was named a Fellow of the American Institute of Graphic Arts.

In 2014, Morioka and Adams were awarded the AIGA medal, which is considered one of the highest awards in the design field. They were recognized for “bringing wit, charm and a distinctly California sensibility to design and for their commitment to leading the design profession through an era of change.”

She was named to I.D. magazine's "ID40," a list of 40 designers who were internationally impacting the design world.
