= Lucille Tenazas =

American graphic designer

- Born: December 17, 1953 (age 72); The Philippines
- Occupation: Graphic designer
- Known for: Communication design, design education

Lucille Tenazas (born December 17, 1953) is a graphic designer, educator, and the founder of Tenazas Design. Her work consists of layered imagery and typography, focusing on the importance of language. She was born in Manila, Philippines, yet has spent a large portion of her life practicing in the United States.

Her work includes projects for the Henry Art Gallery, Rizzoli International, San Francisco International Airport, the San Francisco Museum of Modern Art, the San Francisco Symphony, the Stanford University Art Museum, and the University of California, Berkeley.

Tenazas is Henry Wolf Professor and former Associate Dean in the School of Art, Media and Technology (AMT) at Parsons School of Design in New York.

== Career ==
Tenazas was born on December 17, 1953, in the Philippines and raised in Manila. As a child, she won national painting contests. She received a Bachelor of Fine Arts from the College of the Holy Spirit Manila.

In the mid-1970s, her aunt in Michigan offered to pay for postgraduate tuition in the United States. Unable to find a closer school to her aunt and misunderstanding the country's geography, she enrolled at the California College of Arts and Crafts (now CCA), and moved to San Francisco in 1979. Upon graduation, she began working for the pharmaceutica companies Bristol-Myers and Smith Kline Corporation.

While visiting her aunt in Michigan in December 1979, she stopped by Cranbrook Academy of Art to show Katherine McCoy her portfolio. McCoy accepted Tenazas as a mid-year transfer student at Cranbrook, receiving an MFA in 2-D Design. Here she studied under Michael and Katherine McCoy where they did philosophical and theoretical exploration. Here, she was exposed to the work of several notable designers such as Eliel and Eero Saarinen, and Charles and Ray Eames. The Cranbrook curriculum had been known for testing limits to visual and communication theories. For many students, it made their work fall under a distinct 'Cranbrook signature', but it equipped Tenazas with intellectual rigor and the ability to push the boundaries of her content.

After graduating from Cranbrook in 1981, Tenazas moved to NYC to begin work with James River Corporation. Following this, she began working for Harmon Kemp, a notable New York corporate communications consultancy. With Harmon Kemp, Tenazas gained recognition due to her designs for International Paper.

In 1985, Tenazas moved to San Francisco for a faculty position at the California College of Arts and Crafts where she would continue to work for 20 years. In 2000, she became a founding chair in the graphic design MFA program at CCA. She felt that the new graduate program ought to develop student's ideas through a process of self-discovery. This process of self-discovery is evident in the program's interdisciplinary focus which brings together theory and practice to develop the individual's personal voice in design.

While in California, she founded her design firm, Tenazas Design. The firm is known for its small stage setting and emphasis on work-life balance. The work is known for dealing with themes of hierarchy, control, and layered meaning through images and words. Emphasis on language and the weight of words is a constant theme in her design work. The firm has since been moved to New York City.

Tenazas spent many years working with the American Institute of Graphic Arts (AIGA), starting as an event organizer for the San Francisco chapter, and then later becoming a member of the national board. She was the President of the (AIGA) from 1996 to 1998, becoming the first to be based outside of New York. This led to an expansion of various local chapters; there are now 73 chapters across the United States. In 2013, she was awarded the AIGA Medal. As a commemoration of Tenaza's achievements and contributions to the design world, the then mayor of San Francisco, Willie Brown, declared May 15, 1996 as Lucille Tenazas Day. This was ultimately initiated by the Filipino-American community in the San Francisco Bay Area.

In 1996, the San Francisco Museum of Modern Art held a retrospective of her work.

She moved to New York in 2006 with Richard Barnes, her husband, and their two children. She and her husband, a photographer, designed a poster for 2AES, an architectural group in San Francisco. She is the Henry Wolf Professor and Associate Dean of the School of Art, Media and Technology (AMT) at the Parsons School of Design.

== Awards ==
In 2002, Tenazas was awarded the National Design Award in Communications Design by the Smithsonian Cooper-Hewitt National Design Museum.

Tenazas was awarded the AIGA Medal in 2013 for "her prominent role in translating postmodern ideas into critical design practice; her exploration of the relationship between type, photography and language; and the development and leadership of highly-respected design education programs—always with exquisite execution."

== Notable clientele ==
- Espirit
- Chronicle Books
- Royal Viking Line
- Pacific Film Archive
- International Paper
- Center for the Arts
- Yerba Buena Gardens
- San Francisco Museum of Modern Art
- San Francisco Symphony
- San Francisco International Airport
- Rizzoli International
- Henry Art Gallery
- University of California, Berkeley
- Stanford University Art Museum
