= Michael McCoy =

American industrial designer and educator

- Born: Michael McCoy; September 16, 1944; Eaton Rapids Michigan, USA
- Education: Michigan State University, Industrial Design
- Known for: Industrial Design
- Awards: Design Minds, Smithsonian Institution; IDSA Education Award; Chrysler Award for Innovation in Design

Michael McCoy (born September 16, 1944, in Eaton Rapids, Michigan) is an American industrial designer and educator who has made significant contributions to American design and design education in the latter half of the 20th century. McCoy is best known as the co-chair of the graduate program in Design at Cranbrook Academy of Art where he and spouse Katherine McCoy pioneered semantic approaches to design.

== Education and career ==
Michael McCoy graduated from Michigan State University with a degree in Industrial Design. During his career as an Industrial Designer, McCoy has worked with corporations such as Philips Electronics, Formica Corporation, NEC, Steelcase among many. As a designer, McCoy is best known for his work with furniture manufacturer Knoll International. Along with Dale Fahnstrom, Fahnstrom/McCoy Design Consultants designed the 5 time award-winning Bulldog chair. The Bulldog is Knoll's best-selling office chair to date.

McCoy's innovative design of products, furniture, and interiors has led to museum exhibitions of his work worldwide, including the Smithsonian's Cooper-Hewitt Design Museum in New York, the British Design Museum, the San Francisco Museum of Modern Art, the Kirkland Museum of Fine & Decorative Art, the Axis Gallery in Tokyo and the Cranbrook Art Museum.

Along with his wife, Katherine, McCoy served as co-chair of the graduate program in design at the Cranbrook Academy of Art for 23 years. In addition, he served as distinguished visiting professor at the Royal College of Art in London from 1994 to 1996, and senior lecturer at the IIT Institute of Design from 1995 to 2003. Today, he continues to support design education through High Ground, which offers workshops on innovation and design thinking to practicing design professionals.

McCoy continues to write and lecture internationally on his strategies for interpreting technology and information. He is co-author of Cranbrook Design:The New Discourse published by Rizolli.

== Awards ==
In recognition of his influence on design education, McCoy has received the American Center for Design Education Award, the IDSA Education Award and the Chrysler Award for Innovation in Design.

In 2005, Michael and Katherine McCoy were presented the first-ever Design Mind National Design Award by the Smithsonian's Cooper-Hewitt, National Design Museum. This award “recognizes visionaries who have affected a paradigm shift in design thinking or practice through writing, research, and scholarship”. McCoy continues to practice design through his work with McCoy and McCoy and as a founding partner in Fahnstrom/McCoy Design Consultants in Chicago.

== See also ==
- Cranbrook Design: The New Discourse ISBN 978-0-8478-1252-3

== Bibliography ==
- (n.d.). Retrieved from https://web.archive.org/web/20071005074905/http://www.idsa.org/whatsnew/sections/dh/edu_awards/2000_Mccoy.html
- https://web.archive.org/web/20060902055120/http://www.kcai.edu/newsevents/news/detail/?id=30
- https://web.archive.org/web/20081224004703/http://cooperhewitt.org/NDA/2005/award.asp?catID=dm&nameID=COY
