= Meredith Davis =

American educator, writer and graphic designer

- Born: 1948 (age 76–77); Pittsburgh, PA
- Occupation: Graphic designer
- Known for: Design research and education

Meredith Davis (born 1948, in Pittsburgh, Pennsylvania) is an educator, writer and graphic designer. Her work centers for advocating for a comprehensive, critical and challenging design education.

== Career ==
Davis graduated from The Pennsylvania State University in 1970, receiving her BS in art education and her MEd in 1974. She began her career teaching middle-school art. In 1975, she received her MFA in design from the Cranbrook Academy of Art. While at Cranbrook, she received a grant to develop the Michigan curriculum to introduce students to communication, objects and environments through design thinking. The curriculum research culminated in authoring Problem Solving in the Man-made Environment in 1974.

After graduating, Davis became the curator of education at the Hunter Museum of Art in Chattanooga, Tennessee from 1975 to 1976. In 1976 she began teaching full-time at Virginia Commonwealth University. She founded her firm Communication Design in 1979. There, she oversaw large-scale projects for Fortune 500 clients including Best Products, the United Nations, and Twentieth Century Fund.

In 1989, Davis quit her practice and teaching at VCU to move to North Carolina where she focused on research and teaching as a professor at North Carolina State University (NCSU). She quickly was promoted that year to head the new Graphic Design department and in 1997 became director of the Graduate Program. Her 1999 book Design as a Catalyst for Learning received a CHOICE Award from the Association of College and Research Libraries. In 2005, she became the director of the Ph.D program in Design at NCSU, the second such program in the United States.

She is a former president of the American Center for Design and founding president of the Graphic Design Education Association.

In 2005, Davis was awarded the AIGA Medal.

== Design research ==
Davis' interest in graduate education and graphic design research were the foundation for her belief that research was what marked graphic design as a "profession" rather than a "trade." Design research also identifies how design practice and knowledge is shifting from object-based applications to systems-based applications. These are systems that "evolve and behave organically; transfer control from designers to users or participants; emphasize the importance of community; acknowledge media convergence; and require work by interdisciplinary teams to address the complexity of contemporary problems." For graphic design to succeed as a profession, she is concerned with school accreditation and assessment and began collaborating with AIGA and the National Association of Schools of Art and Design (NASAD) to design national standards that set minimum thresholds for program performance while allowing innovation at institutions.
