= Cheryl Heller =

American business strategist and designer

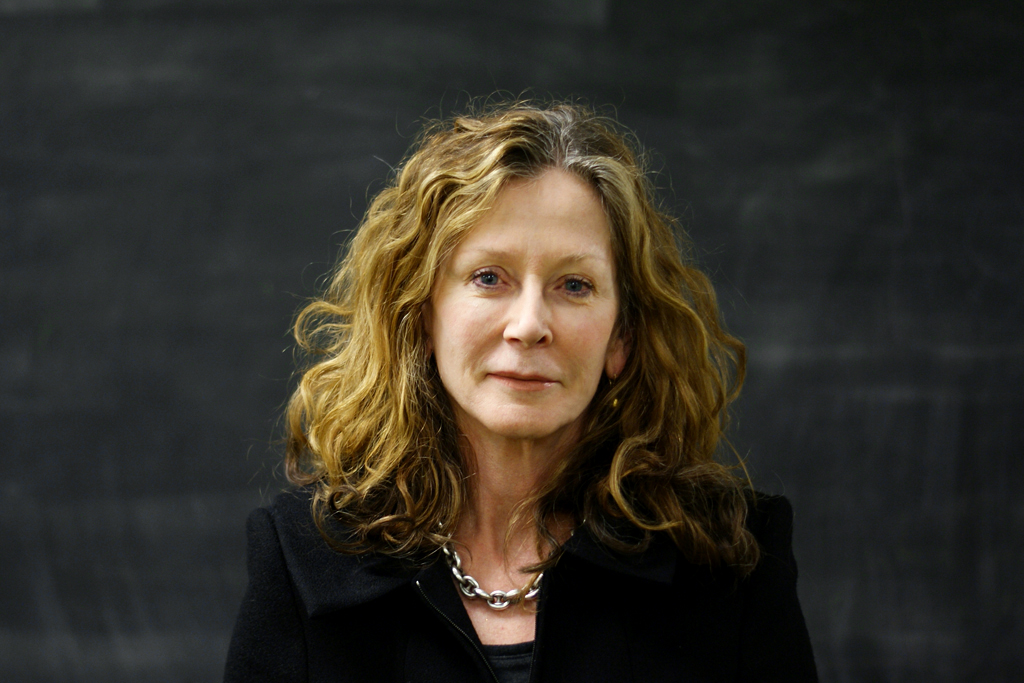
- Education: Ohio Wesleyan University; Goddard College; RMIT University, Design PhD
- Known for: Founding the first MFA program in Design for Social Innovation at the School of Visual Arts; Nonprofit contributions
- Awards: AIGA award, 2014

Cheryl Heller is an American business strategist and designer. She founded the first Master of Fine Arts (MFA) program in Design for Social Innovation at the School of Visual Arts, is the President of the design lab "CommonWise", and is the recipient of the AIGA Medal for her contributions to the field of design. As a Rockefeller Bellagio Fellow, Heller is also credited with founding the first design department in an advertising agency. Heller's work focuses on the impact of design on human health and society.

== Education ==
Heller attended the School of the Museum of Fine Arts, where she studied painting and printmaking. She earned a bachelor's degree in Fine Arts from Ohio Wesleyan University. She also holds an MFA in Creative Writing from Goddard College. In 2021, Heller earned her PhD in Design from the College of Design and Social Context at RMIT University.

== Careers ==
Heller began her career in advertising at Giardini/Russell in Boston. She co-founded Heller/Breene within the Wight Collins Rutherford Scott (WCRS) Group. Heller/Breene was a small design firm where she served as chairperson and creative director until 1989; two months after her departure, WCRS Group sold the firm to Cipriani. After leaving Heller/Breene, she worked at Wells Rich Greene BDDP. In 2003, she began partnering with entrepreneurs and organizations to advance social and environmental projects.

After becoming president of the advertising company, she grew the division to $50 million in billings, which then became an independent entity. She has since worked as a consultant writing about business design strategies, and she has taught creativity to leaders and organizations.

In 1999, she created the "Ideas that Matter" program for Sappi, which awards grants to designers working on social and environmental projects. Heller is the former board chair and current Adviser to PopTech, a Senior Fellow at the Babson Social Innovation Lab, a member of the Innovation Advisory Board for the Lumina Foundation, and an adviser to DataKind. She advises the Bill and Melinda Gates Foundation and USAID on an initiative to integrate Human Centered Design into public health and has led an initiative to reduce the flow of young people from foster care to homelessness. Heller served as an adviser to Paul Polak and the Cooper Hewitt National Design Museum on the exhibit, "Design for the Other 90%." She is a Matrix Award winner for excellence in communication.

== MFA Program ==
In 2011, Heller founded the MFA program for Design for Social Innovation at the School of Visual Arts. This program is recognized as the first of its kind. The three-year program enables students with bachelor's degrees to further develop their skills and become creative leaders in government, industry, healthcare, technology, and global Non-Government Organizations (NGOs).
