= Marcia Lausen =

American graphic designer

Marcia Lausen (born 1959) is an American graphic designer and educator. She is a professor and former director of the School of Design at the University of Illinois (UIC) in Chicago, and co-founder of design firm Studio/lab. Lausen was awarded 2015 AIGA Medal for her academic leadership and significant contributions to American graphic design.

Lausen was born and grew up in Fort Wayne, Indiana and graduated from Indiana University Bloomington in 1981. She graduated from the Yale School of Art with a Master's degree in 1985, where she studied under Paul Rand.

Lausen is the author of Design for Democracy: Ballot and Election Design, published in 2007. The book examines techniques to improve the graphic design of butterfly ballot that led to the highly publicized Florida vote recount in the 2000 U.S. Presidential election. In collaboration with American Institute of Graphic Arts (AIGA), Lausen led initiatives to redesign ballots in Cook County, Illinois and the state of Oregon. A copy of the book is held in the permanent collection of the Art Institute of Chicago museum. Lausen lives in Chicago and is a former president of the Chicago chapter of AIGA.
