= Stephen H. Horgan =

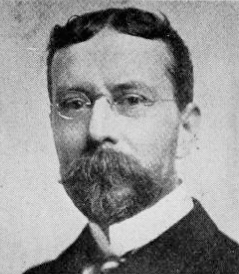
- Born: Stephen Henry Horgan; February 2, 1854; Norfolk, Virginia
- Died: August 30, 1941 (aged 87); Orange, New Jersey
- Occupation: Inventor
- Awards: AIGA medal (1924)

Stephen Henry Horgan (February 2, 1854 – August 30, 1941), was the inventor of the halftone process for newspaper usage, and early-on improvements.

== Biography ==
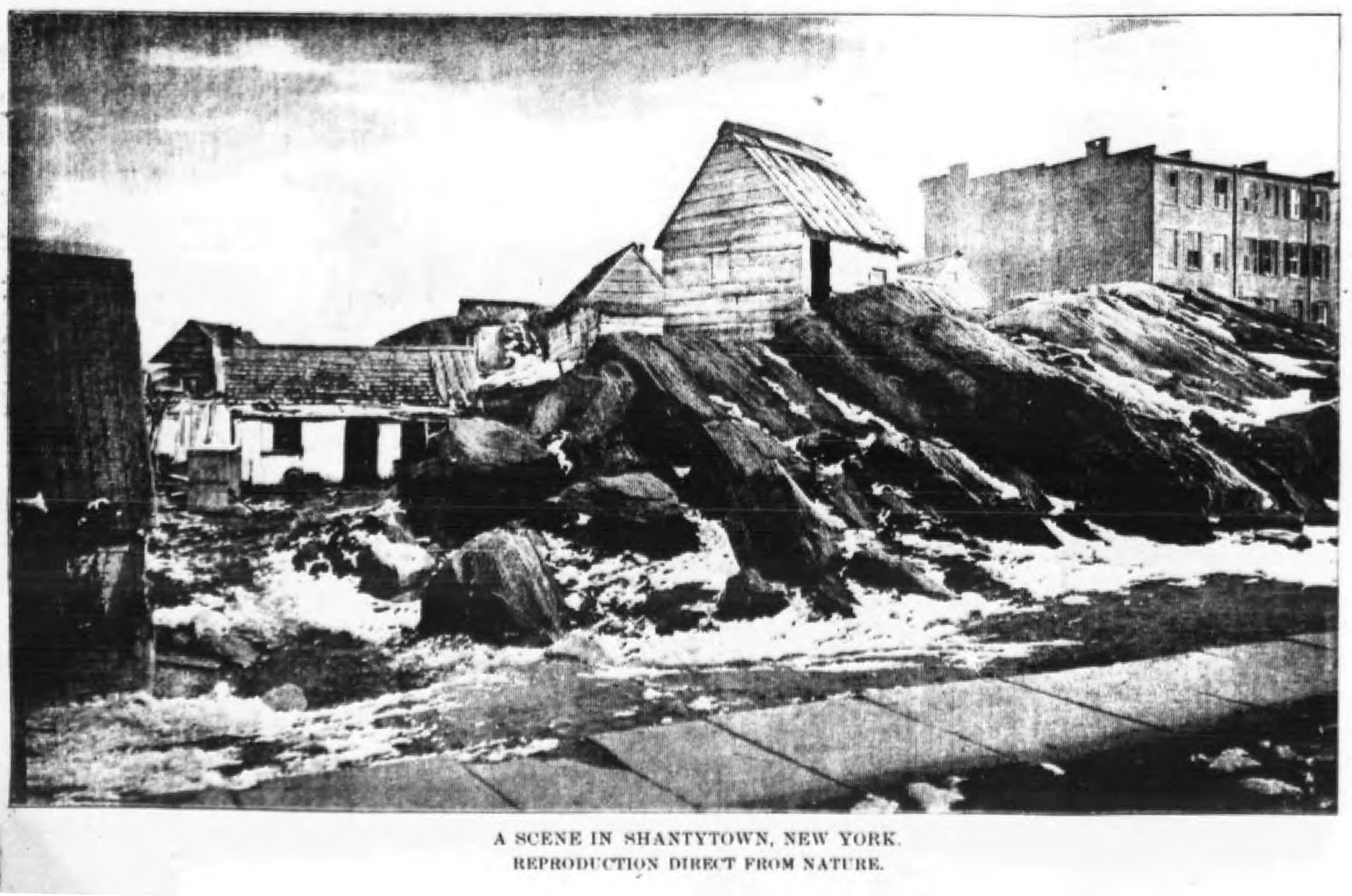
A Scene in Shantytown, New York, The Daily Graphic, March 4, 1880

Stephen Henry Horgan was born in Norfolk, Virginia on February 2, 1854.

The half-tone method he invented was to use a glass screen with fine lines in it which translated the gradations of an image when placed between a light-sensitive metal plate and a negative. The final image created was a metal picture made of black dots surrounded by white. It is said that he was fired from that job by Herald publisher James Gordon Bennett, Jr., who described the idea as idiotic. Horgan then went over to their rival, The Daily Graphic. In 1913, Horgan published his method.

The Graphic debuted half-tone printing with the first printed photograph of an image of Steinway Hall in Manhattan, published on December 2, 1873. His Shantytown scene was printed by them in 1880. It was "the first reproduction of a photograph with a full tonal range in a newspaper."

Horgan was the first to create a newspaper image with a rotary/power press. He was then working for the New-York Tribune in 1897. A major breakthrough, this brought about the rapid increase of illustrations in dailies.

Horgan received the AIGA medal in 1924 for his invention.

He contributed an article on Frederick W. von Egloffstein to the Catholic Encyclopedia.

Stephen Henry Horgan died in Orange, New Jersey on August 30, 1941.
