= Emmett McBain =

African-American graphic designer

Emmett R. McBain Jr. (1935 – 2012) was an African-American graphic designer and art director.

== Biography ==
McBain studied art and design at several schools in his hometown of Chicago, including the Ray Vogue School of Commercial Art, American Academy of Art, and IIT Institute of Design. He designed advertisements that appeared in print as well as on television. Many of his campaigns, for products including cigarettes, cars, and Beefeater Gin, featured African Americans. He also designed album covers, magazines, and public service ads.

McBain joined the first African-American ad agency, Vince Cullers Advertising, in 1956. He worked there for a year and then became an assistant art director at Playboy Records. He founded McBain Associates in 1959 and then went back to Vince Cullers Advertising in 1968 as an art director. His campaign for Newport menthol cigarettes promoted the product to Black consumers and depicted young, fashionable Black people in striking poses.

McBain is credited with formulating the idea of "positive realism" in advertising directed to African-American consumers.

In 1971, he teamed up with Tom Burrell, another Black designer, as co-founder of Burrell McBain, Inc (now Burrell Communications). An ad for Vince Cullers Advertising emphasizes the slogan “Black is Beautiful.” In 2017, the American Institute of Graphic Arts awarded McBain the AIGA Medal, given to designers who have made exceptional contributions to the field of graphic design.

McBain's papers are held by the University of Illinois at Chicago.
