= Nancy Skolos =

American graphic designer

Nancy Skolos (born 1955) is an American graphic designer, author, educator and co-founder of Skolos-Wedell Studio. Skolos is best known for her work as professor at Rhode Island School of Design (RISD) where she had previously served as the graphic design department head.

== Work ==
Skolos attended University of Cincinnati for two years in the industrial design department, later transferring to Cranbrook Academy of Art and completing her BFA degree in design in 1977. She then attended Yale University, graduating with an MFA in design in 1979. Skolos met photographer Thomas Wedell while attending Cranbrook in 1975 and the pair married in 1979.

In 1980, they opened the Skolos, Wedell + Raynor in Boston with partner Kenneth Raynor. In 1990, Raynor left the Boston area, and the studio carried on as Skolos–Wedell. The studio's primary format is the poster after experimentation in a variety of formats early on. The studio has received numerous awards and has been widely published and exhibited, Skolos–Wedell posters are included in the graphic design collections of the Museum of Modern Art, The Israel Museum, and the Museum of Design, Zürich. In 2017, in conjunction with Tom Wedell, the pair was awarded the AIGA Medal for their work "pushing the boundaries of art, design, and technology with a distinctive vision to find connection among disparate forms."

Skolos has been teaching at RISD since 1989 and full-time faculty since 1999.

== Publications ==
This is a list of books published by Skolos. The book Graphic Design Process was published in multiple languages including Chinese, French, and Portuguese.

- 1979 – Translating Musical Events Into Visual Imagery by Nancy Skolos (thesis publication)
- 1992 – Ferrington Guitars/Book and CD by Danny Ferrington, Nancy Skolos and Tom Wedell
- 2006 – Type, Image, Message: A Graphic Design Layout Workshop by Nancy Skolos and Tom Wedell
- 2012 – Graphic Design Process: From Problem to Solution, 20 Case Studies by Nancy Skolos
