= HOW (magazine) =

Defunct bimonthly magazine for graphic designers

HOW was a bimonthly magazine for graphic designers published between 1985 and 2019. It was edited by Megan Lane Patrick. It was published by F+W Media of Cincinnati, Ohio. The magazine covered business, creativity, design, and technology.

HOW organized six annual creative competitions, covering graphic design, logo design, promotion and marketing, interactive media, and in-house design. Since 1990, HOW held an annual design conference HOW Design Live. In 2011, HOW introduced an online education platform HOW Design University (HOW U), which offered online classes, boot camps, and webinars for creative professionals.

F+W Media, the publisher of HOW, filed for Chapter 11 bankruptcy on March 10, 2019. Consequently, HOW magazine and its related websites were discontinued, except for the HOW Design Live conference which was most recently held in 2024.
