= Alvin Eisenman =

American graphic designer

Alvin Eisenman (June 18, 1921 – September 3, 2013) was an American graphic designer and educator throughout the last half of the 20th century. He was most notable for founding and heading the Yale School of Art's graduate program in graphic design beginning in 1951 — the first graduate program in graphic design in the United States. He remained the director of that program until his retirement in 1990, at which point he was succeeded by Sheila Levrant de Bretteville. Eisenman continued to teach in the program through the 1990s.

== Biography ==
Raised in rural DuBois, Pennsylvania, Eisenman did his undergraduate work in graphic arts at Dartmouth College. After World War II, Eisenman took a position as a designer for the McGraw-Hill Book Company. By 1950, Eisenman was in New Haven, first in the role as a designer for the Yale Press and soon becoming a leader in establishing a graduate program for graphic design at Yale. For the early program, Eisenman drew faculty from the Royal College of Art in London (as part of a faculty exchange system) and recruited liberal arts graduates from Yale, Harvard and the Rhode Island School of Design. The Yale graphic design program in the 1950s was successful in bringing together established and upcoming designers such as Paul Rand, Herbert Matter, Armin Hofmann, Bradbury Thompson, Wolfgang Weingart, Lorraine Ferguson, Josef Albers, Alan Fletcher , Lester Beall and Alexey Brodovitch. Eisenman is interviewed in the 2010 film The Visual Language of Herbert Matter discussing Matter at Yale.

From 1960 to 1963, Eisenman was also head of the American Institute of Graphic Arts. He was awarded the AIGA medal in 1990.
