= National Design Awards =

American award

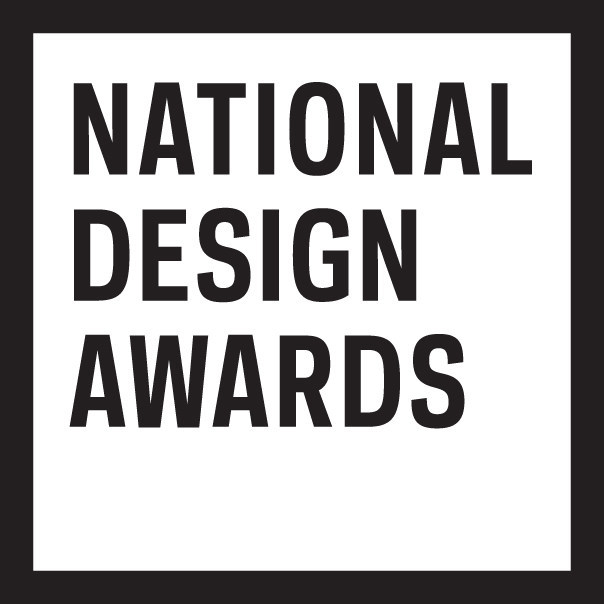
- Awarded for: American design excellence
- Country: United States
- Presented by: Cooper-Hewitt, Smithsonian Design Museum
- Established: 2000
- Website: National Design Awards

The American National Design Awards, founded in 2000, are various awards funded and bestowed by the Cooper-Hewitt, Smithsonian Design Museum.

There are seven official design categories, and three additional awards when applicable. Any supplemental awards deemed appropriate may be awarded at the discretion of the acting jury or institution.

== History ==
=== Origins ===
In 2000, the awards and associated programs were introduced as an official project of the White House Millennium Council. In 2025, the award program celebrated its twenty-fifth year.

=== Jury ===
The 2023 National Design Awards jury, chaired by Dung Ngo, editor in chief, August Journal, also included Tiffany Chu, chief of staff to the mayor, City of Boston; Carla Fernández Tena, creative director, Carla Fernández; Noah Schwarz, director of product design, Herman Miller; and Sara Zewde, principal and assistant professor of practice, Studio Zewde and Harvard University.

In 2025, the selection committee was helmed by Smithsonian Design Museum director Maria Nicanor and Maurice Cox, chair of the 2025 National Design Awards jury.

The 2026 jury was chaired by Aric Chen, director of the Zaha Hadid Foundation, and also included Liz Danzico, vice president of design at Microsoft AI; Patricia Moore, president of MooreDesign Associates; Henk Ovink, executive director of the Global Commission on the Economics of Water; Valerie Steele, director and chief curator of the Museum at the Fashion Institute of Technology; and Thomas Woltz, senior principal of Nelson Byrd Woltz Landscape Architects.

== Awards ==
The ten official design categories include:

- Architecture
- Communication Design
- Digital Design
- Fashion Design (created in 2003)
- Interior Design (created in 2005)
- Interaction Design (created in 2009)
- Landscape Architecture
- Product Design
- Design Visionary
- Climate Action
- Emerging Designer

The three additional awards categories are:

- Lifetime Achievement
- Design Patron (created in 2001)
- Design Mind (2005–2019)

Past supplemental categories have included:

- People's Design Award (2006–2010)
- Special Commendation (Awarded in 2008)
- Special Jury Commendation (created in 2005, but omitted in 2008)
- American Original (Awarded in 2000 and 2002 only)

In 2006, the People's Design Award was created with the intent to provide the general public with the chance to nominate and vote for their favorite design. Individuals can nominate and vote for their favorite designers via the official website. The award was last given in 2010.

== Candidate selection criteria ==
Individual candidates must be citizens or long-term residents of the United States and have been practicing design for at least 7 years. For any corporation or institution, it must have its headquarters in the United States. The honorees are selected upon a body of realized work, not for any one specific project.

Potential candidates are proposed by an official Nominating Committee and are invited to submit materials for a jury's review. Submissions consist of resumes, portfolios, publications by and about the candidates, and professional-quality audio-visual samples.

The award recipients come from a range of design disciplines, including architecture, landscape architecture, fashion, communications, media, interiors, digital, and production design.

== Objectives ==
With its public programs, including ones skewed toward students, the National Design Awards are meant to highlight how design impacts daily life and "aim to increase national awareness about the impact of design in everyday life."

According to the Smithsonian, the awardees "are recognized for design innovation and impact in improving the world."

The program highlights a range of design disciplines, including architecture, landscape architecture, fashion, communications, media, interiors, digital, production design, and in 2025 for climate action design.

For Maria Nicanor, director of the Smithsonian Museum, the award series is about how design "touches all aspects of our lives every single day—from the buildings we live, learn and work in, to the physical and digital systems that deliver our basic services, the clothes we wear, the spaces we gather in or the creativity and beauty that help us understand ourselves as a nation—and yet design's undeniable influence can go unseen."

The National Design Awards program include a ceremony and gala.

According to Cooper Hewitt, the program also "connects the public with award winners through free virtual talks, workshops, resources, and more."

== Recipients ==
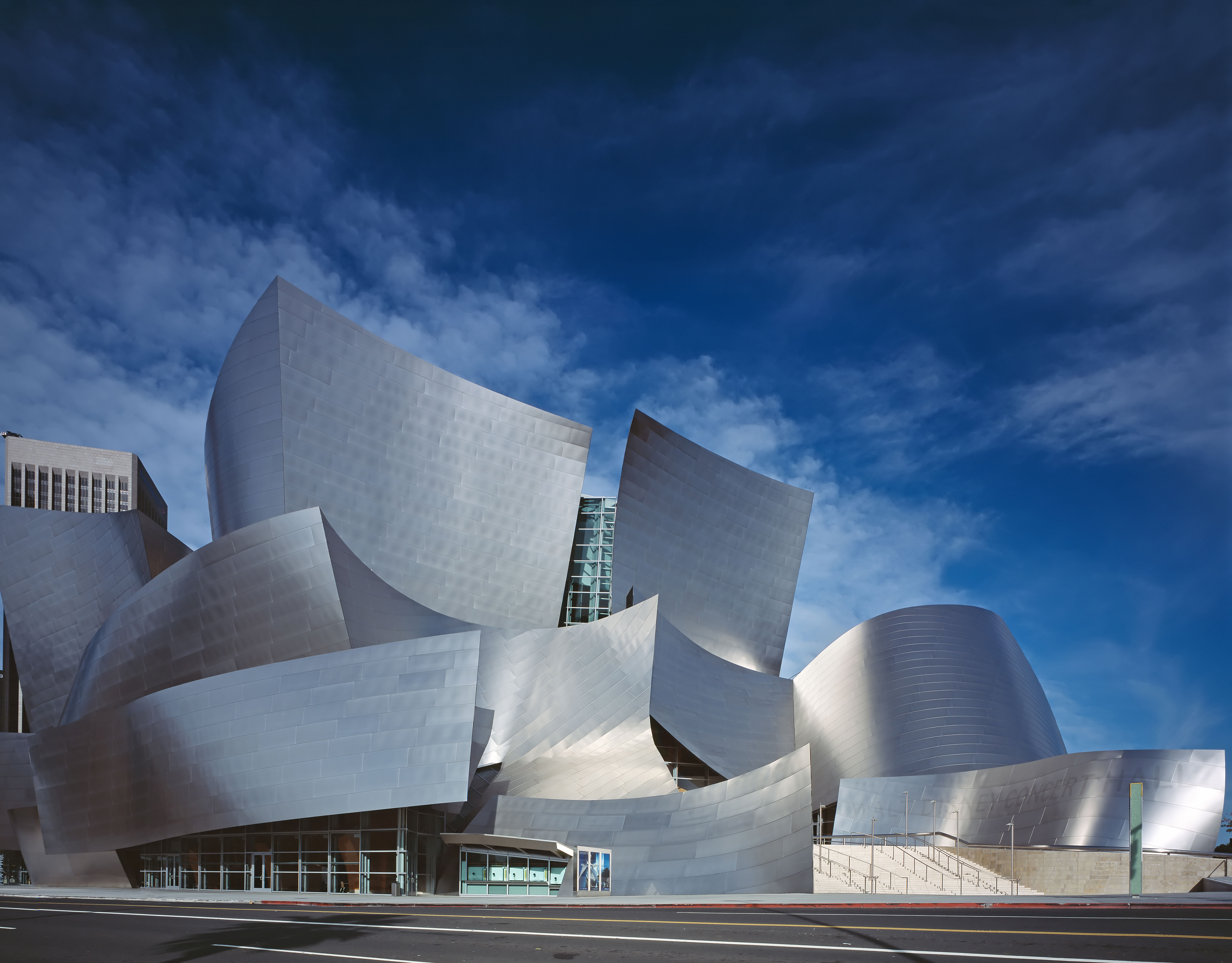
Frank Gehry, Lifetime Achievement winner in 2000, architect of Disney Concert Hall.

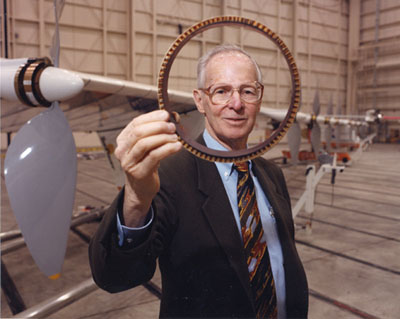
Paul MacCready, Product Design winner in 2000, AeroVironment Chairman showing a cross section of the AeroVironment/NASA Helios Prototype wing spar.

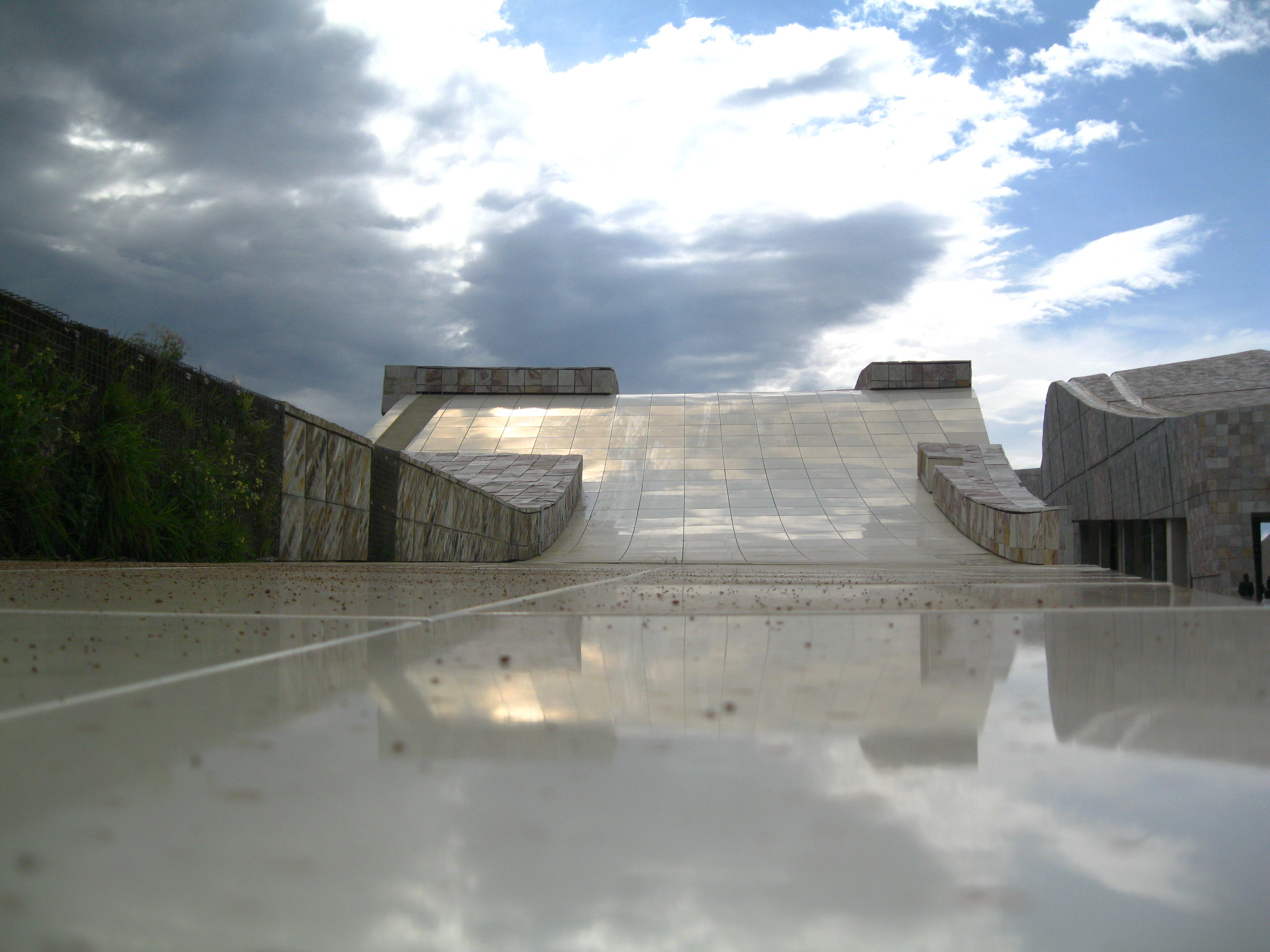
Peter Eisenman, Architecture Design winner in 2001, architect for "Cidade da Cultura" in Spain.

IDEO, Product Design winner in 2001.

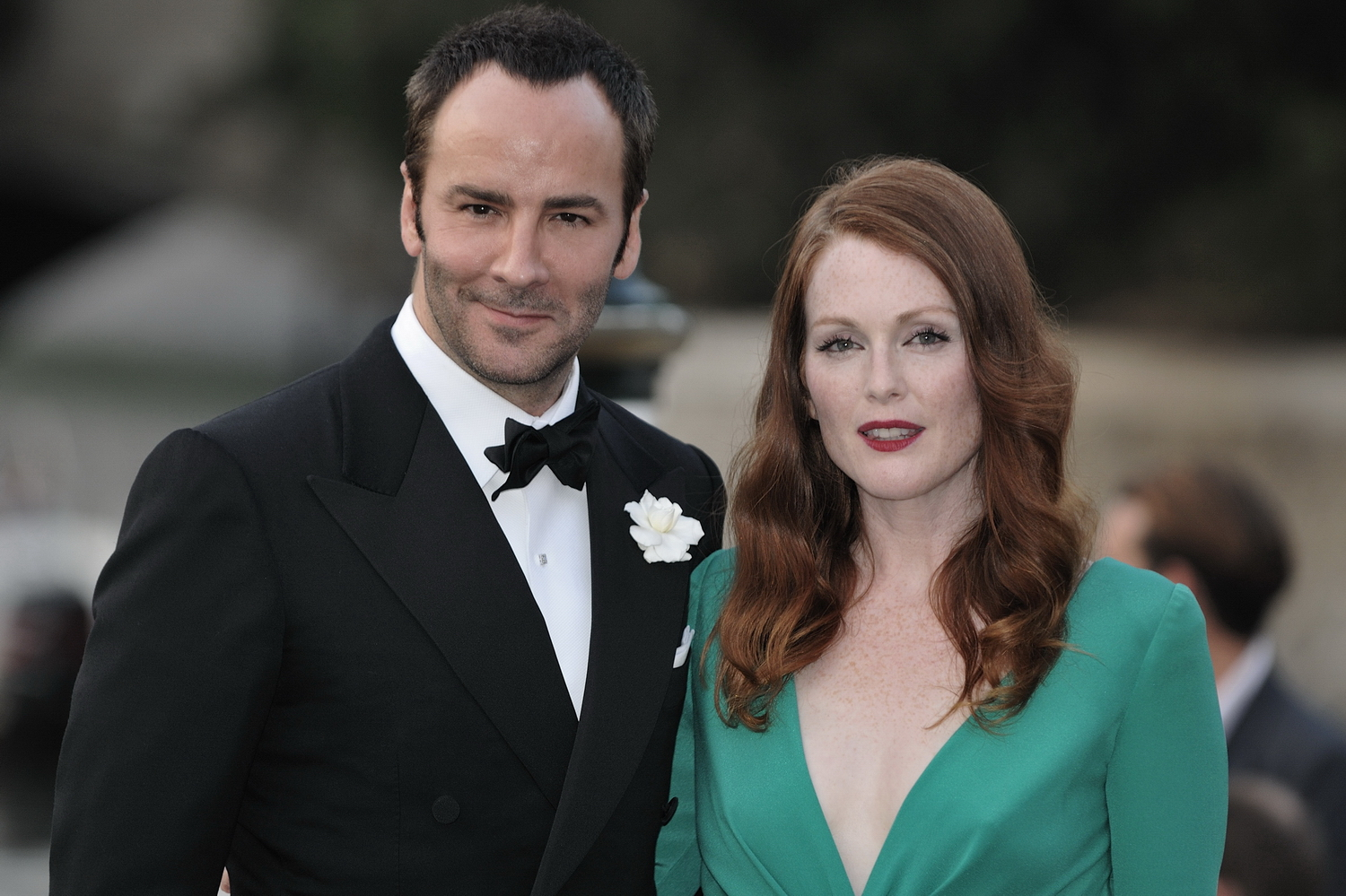
Tom Ford (left), Fashion Design winner in 2003 with actress Julianne Moore.

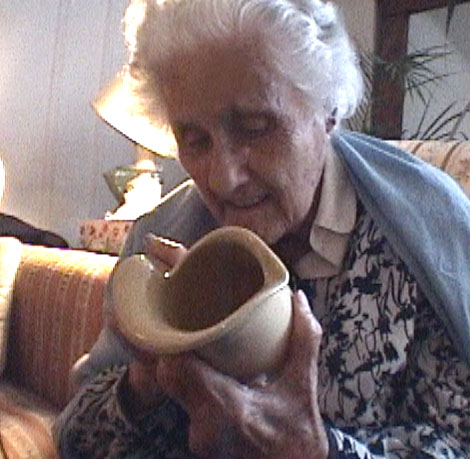
Eva Zeisel, Lifetime Achievement winner in 2005.

| Year | Award | Winner | Finalists | Ref |
|---|---|---|---|---|
| 2000 | Lifetime Achievement | Frank Gehry | | |
| 2000 | Corporate Achievement | Apple Computer | | |
| 2000 | Communications Design | Ralph Appelbaum | | |
| 2000 | Landscape Architecture | Lawrence Halprin | | |
| 2000 | Product Design | Paul MacCready | | |
| 2000 | American Original | John Hejduk and Morris Lapidus | | |
| 2001 | Lifetime Achievement | Robert Wilson | | |
| 2001 | Corporate Achievement | Tupperware | | |
| 2001 | Architecture Design | Peter Eisenman | | |
| 2001 | Communications Design | John Maeda | | |
| 2001 | Landscape Architecture | Julie Bargmann of D.I.R.T. Studio | | |
| 2001 | Product Design | David M. Kelley & IDEO | | |
| 2001 | Design Patron | Stanley Marcus | | |
| 2002 | Lifetime Achievement | Dan Kiley | | |
| 2002 | Corporate Achievement | Whirlpool Corporation | | |
| 2002 | Architecture Design | Steven Holl | | |
| 2002 | Communications Design | Lucille Tenazas | | |
| 2002 | Landscape Architecture | James Carpenter | | |
| 2002 | Product Design | Niels Diffrient | | |
| 2002 | Design Patron | Andre Balazs | | |
| 2002 | American Original | Geoffrey Beene | | |
| 2003 | Lifetime Achievement | I.M. Pei | | |
| 2003 | Corporate Achievement | Target Corporation | | |
| 2003 | Architecture Design | Billie Tsien and Tod Williams | | |
| 2003 | Communications Design | Robert Greenberg | | |
| 2003 | Landscape Architecture | Michael Van Valkenburgh | | |
| 2003 | Fashion Design | Tom Ford | | |
| 2003 | Product Design | Herman Miller | | |
| 2003 | Design Patron | Gordon Segal | | |
| 2004 | Lifetime Achievement | Milton Glaser | | |
| 2004 | Corporate Achievement | Aveda Corporation | | |
| 2004 | Architecture Design | Rick Joy and Polshek Partnership | | |
| 2004 | Communications Design | @radical.media | | |
| 2004 | Landscape Architecture | William A. McDonough and Parrtners | | |
| 2004 | Fashion Design | Yeohlee Teng | | |
| 2004 | Product Design | Yves Béhar | | |
| 2004 | Design Patron | Amanda M. Burden | | |
| 2005 | Lifetime Achievement | Eva Zeisel | | |
| 2005 | Corporate Achievement | Patagonia | | |
| 2005 | Architecture Design | Diller Scofidio + Renfro | Tom Kundig, Antoine Predock | |
| 2005 | Communications Design | Stefan Sagmeister | 2x4, Paula Scher | |
| 2005 | Landscape Architecture | Ned Kahn | Kathryn Gustafson, Peter Walker and Partners | |
| 2005 | Fashion Design | Toledo Studio | Maria Cornejo, Project Alabama | |
| 2005 | Product Design | Burt Rutan | Boym Partners, Bill Stumpf | |
| 2005 | Design Patron | Richard M. Daley, Mayor of Chicago | | |
| 2005 | Design Mind | Katherine McCoy and Michael McCoy | | |
| 2005 | Interior Design | Richard Gluckman | Michael Gabellini, Hugh Hardy | |
| 2005 | Special Jury Commendation | Sergio Palleroni | | |
| 2006 | Lifetime Achievement | Paolo Soleri | | |
| 2006 | Corporate Achievement | Nike, Inc. | | |
| 2006 | Architecture Design | Thom Mayne | Stanley Saitowitz, Bernard Tschumi | |
| 2006 | Communications Design | 2x4 | Jake Barton, Chip Kidd | |
| 2006 | Landscape Architecture | Martha Schwartz | Andrea Cochran, Ken Smith | |
| 2006 | Fashion Design | Maria Cornejo | Thom Browne, Peter Som | |
| 2006 | Product Design | Bill Stumpf | Antenna Design, Jonathan Ive | |
| 2006 | Design Patron | Craig Robins | n/a | |
| 2006 | People's Choice | The Katrina Cottage by Marianne Cusato | n/a | |
| 2006 | Design Mind | Paola Antonelli | n/a | |
| 2006 | Interior Design | Michael Gabellini | Annabelle Selldorf, Tsao & McKown Architects | |
| 2006 | Special Jury Commendation | Syd Mead | n/a | |
| 2007 | Lifetime Achievement | Antoine Predock | | |
| 2007 | Corporate Achievement | Adobe Systems | | |
| 2007 | Architecture Design | Office dA – Monica Ponce de Leon / Nader Tehrani | | |
| 2007 | Communications Design | Chip Kidd | | |
| 2007 | Landscape Architecture | PWP Landscape Architecture | | |
| 2007 | Fashion Design | Rick Owens | | |
| 2007 | Product Design | Jonathan Ive | | |
| 2007 | Design Patron | Maharam | | |
| 2007 | People's Choice | TOMS Shoes by Blake Mycoskie | | |
| 2007 | Design Mind | Denise Scott Brown and Robert Venturi | | |
| 2007 | Interior Design | Lewis.Tsurumaki.Lewis | | |
| 2007 | Special Jury Commendation | Frank Ching | | |
| 2008 | Lifetime Achievement | Charles Harrison | | |
| 2008 | Corporate Achievement | Google, Inc. | | |
| 2008 | Architecture Design | Tom Kundig | | |
| 2008 | Communications Design | Scott Stowell | | |
| 2008 | Landscape Architecture | OLIN | | |
| 2008 | Fashion Design | Ralph Rucci | | |
| 2008 | Product Design | Antenna Design | | |
| 2008 | Design Patron | Architecture for Humanity | | |
| 2008 | People's Choice | Stuart Karten Design (for the Zon hearing aid) | | |
| 2008 | Design Mind | Michael Bierut | | |
| 2008 | Interior Design | Rockwell Group | | |
| 2008 | Design Commendation | Janna Bullock | | |
| 2009 | Lifetime Achievement | Bill Moggridge | | |
| 2009 | Corporate Achievement | Walker Art Center | | |
| 2009 | Architecture Design | SHoP Architects | | |
| 2009 | Communications Design | The New York Times Graphics Department | | |
| 2009 | Landscape Architecture | Hood Design | | |
| 2009 | Fashion Design | Francisco Costa for Calvin Klein Collection | | |
| 2009 | Product Design | Boym Partners | | |
| 2009 | Design Patron | Reynold Levy | | |
| 2009 | People's Choice | Trek Lime Bike | | |
| 2009 | Design Mind | Amory B. Lovins | | |
| 2009 | Interior Design | Tsao & McKown Architects | | |
| 2009 | Interaction design | Perceptive Pixel, Inc. | | |
| 2010 | Lifetime Achievement | Jane Thompson | | |
| 2010 | Corporate Achievement | U.S. Green Building Council | | |
| 2010 | Architecture Design | KieranTimberlake | | |
| 2010 | Communications Design | Stephen Doyle | | |
| 2010 | Landscape Architecture | James Corner Field Operations | | |
| 2010 | Fashion Design | Rodarte | | |
| 2010 | Product Design | Smart Design | | |
| 2010 | People's Choice | The Braille Alphabet Bracelet by Leslie Ligon | | |
| 2010 | Design Mind | Ralph Caplan | | |
| 2010 | Interior Design | William Sofield | | |
| 2010 | Interaction design | Lisa Strausfeld | | |
| 2011 | Lifetime Achievement | Matthew Carter | | |
| 2011 | Corporate Achievement | Knoll | | |
| 2011 | Architecture Design | Architecture Research Office | | |
| 2011 | Communications Design | Rick Valicenti | | |
| 2011 | Landscape Architecture | Gustafson Guthrie Nichol | | |
| 2011 | Fashion Design | J. Mendel | | |
| 2011 | Product Design | Continuum | | |
| 2011 | Design Mind | Steven Heller | | |
| 2011 | Interior Design | Shelton, Mindel & Associates | | |
| 2011 | Interaction design | Ben Fry | | |
| 2012 | Lifetime Achievement | Richard Saul Wurman | | |
| 2012 | Corporate Achievement | Design that Matters | | |
| 2012 | Architecture Design | Mack Scogin Merrill Elam Architects | | |
| 2012 | Communication Design | Rebeca Méndez | | |
| 2012 | Landscape Architecture | Stoss Landscape Urbanism | | |
| 2012 | Fashion Design | Thom Browne | | |
| 2012 | Product Design | Scott Wilson | | |
| 2012 | Design Mind | Janine Benyus | | |
| 2012 | Design Patron | Red Burns | | |
| 2012 | Interior Design | Clive Wilkinson Architects | | |
| 2012 | Interaction Design | Tim Huff | | |
| 2013 | Lifetime Achievement | James Wines | | |
| 2013 | Design Mind | Michael Sorkin | | |
| 2013 | Corporate & Institutional Achievement | TED | | |
| 2013 | Architecture Design | Studio Gang Architects | | |
| 2013 | Communication Design | Paula Scher | | |
| 2013 | Fashion Design | Behnaz Sarafpour | | |
| 2013 | Interaction Design | Local Projects | | |
| 2013 | Interior Design | Aidlin Darling Design | | |
| 2013 | Landscape Architecture | Margie Ruddick | | |
| 2013 | Product Design | NewDealDesign | | |
| 2014 | Lifetime Achievement | Ivan Chermayeff and Tom Geismar | | |
| 2014 | Corporate Achievement | Etsy | | |
| 2014 | Architecture Design | Brooks + Scarpa | | |
| 2014 | Communication Design | Office | | |
| 2014 | Landscape Architecture | Andrea Cochran Landscape Architecture | | |
| 2014 | Fashion Design | Narciso Rodriguez | | |
| 2014 | Product Design | LUNAR | | |
| 2014 | Design Mind | Witold Rybczynski | | |
| 2014 | Interior Design | Roman and Williams Buildings and Interiors | | |
| 2014 | Interaction Design | Aaron Koblin | | |
| 2015 | Lifetime Achievement | Michael Graves | | |
| 2015 | Director's Award | Jack Lenor Larsen | | |
| 2015 | Design Mind | Rosanne Haggerty | | |
| 2015 | Corporate & Institutional Achievement | Heath Ceramics | | |
| 2015 | Architecture Design | MOS Architectures | | |
| 2015 | Communication Design | Project Projects (Prem Krishnamurthy, Adam Michaels) | | |
| 2015 | Fashion Design | threeASFOUR | | |
| 2015 | Interaction Design | John Underkoffler | | |
| 2015 | Landscape Architecture | Coen + Partners | | |
| 2015 | Interior Design | Commune | | |
| 2015 | Product Design | Stephen Burks | | |
| 2016 | Lifetime Achievement | Moshe Safdie | | |
| 2016 | Director's Award | Make It Right | | |
| 2016 | Design Mind | Bruce Mau | | |
| 2016 | Corporate & Institutional Achievement | The Center for Urban Pedagogy | | |
| 2016 | Architecture Design | Marlon Blackwell Architects | | |
| 2016 | Communication Design | Geoff McFetridge | | |
| 2016 | Fashion Design | Opening Ceremony | | |
| 2016 | Interaction Design | Tellart | | |
| 2016 | Landscape Architecture | Hargreaves Associates | | |
| 2016 | Interior Design | Studio O+A | | |
| 2016 | Product Design | Ammunition | | |
| 2017 | Lifetime Achievement | Hartmut Esslinger | | |
| 2017 | Director's Award | Susan S. Szenasy | | |
| 2017 | Design Mind | Craig L. Wilkins | | |
| 2017 | Corporate & Institutional Achievement | Design Trust for Public Space | | |
| 2017 | Architecture Design | MASS Design Group | | |
| 2017 | Communication Design | Jennifer Morla | | |
| 2017 | Fashion Design | Slow and Steady Wins the Race | | |
| 2017 | Interaction Design | Stamen Design | | |
| 2017 | Landscape Architecture | Surfacedesign | | |
| 2017 | Interior Design | Deborah Berke Partners | | |
| 2017 | Product Design | Joe Doucet | | |
| 2018 | Lifetime Achievement | Gail Anderson | | |
| 2018 | Director's Award | Darren Walker | | |
| 2018 | Design Mind | Anne Whiston Spirn | | |
| 2018 | Corporate & Institutional Achievement | Design for America | | |
| 2018 | Architecture Design | WEISS/MANFREDI | | |
| 2018 | Communication Design | Civilization (Design) | | |
| 2018 | Fashion Design | Christina Kim | | |
| 2018 | Interaction Design | Neri Oxman | | |
| 2018 | Interior Design | Oppenheim Architecture + Design | | |
| 2018 | Landscape Architecture | Mikyoung Kim Design | | |
| 2018 | Product Design | Blu Dot | | |
| 2019 | Lifetime Achievement | Susan Kare | | |
| 2019 | Design Mind | Patricia Moore | | |
| 2019 | Corporate & Institutional Achievement | MIT D-Lab | | |
| 2019 | Architecture Design | Thomas Phifer | | |
| 2019 | Communication Design | Tobias Frere-Jones | | |
| 2019 | Fashion Design | Derek Lam | | |
| 2019 | Interaction Design | Ivan Poupyrev | | |
| 2019 | Interior Design | IwamotoScott Architecture | | |
| 2019 | Landscape Architecture | SCAPE Landscape Architecture | | |
| 2019 | Product Design | Tinker Hatfield | | |
| 2019 | Emerging Designer | Open Style Lab | | |
| 2020 | Design Visionary | Kickstarter | | |
| 2020 | Climate Action | Sponge Park | | |
| 2020 | Emerging Designer | Studio One Eighty Nine | | |
| 2020 | Architecture | Snøhetta | | |
| 2020 | Communication Design | Scott Dadich | | |
| 2020 | Digital Design | Design I/O | | |
| 2020 | Fashion Design | TELFAR | | |
| 2020 | Landscape Architecture | OJB Landscape Architecture | | |
| 2020 | Product Design | Catapult Design | | |
| 2021 | Design Visionary | Cheryl D. Miller | | |
| 2021 | Climate Action | InVert Self-Shading Window by Doris Sung | | |
| 2021 | Architecture and Interior Design | Ross Barney Architects | | |
| 2021 | Communication Design | Imaginary Forces | | |
| 2021 | Fashion Design | Becca McCharen-Tran | | |
| 2021 | Digital Design | Behnaz Farahi | | |
| 2021 | Landscape Architecture | Studio-MLA | | |
| 2021 | Product Design | BioLite | | |
| 2021 | Emerging Designer | Colloqate Design | | |
| 2022 | Design Visionary | Nader Tehrani | | |
| 2022 | Climate Action | WEDEW by David Hertz | | |
| 2022 | Emerging Designer | Emily Adams Bode | | |
| 2022 | Architecture / Interior Design | Rural Studio | | |
| 2022 | Communication Design | Giorgia Lupi | | |
| 2022 | Digital Design | Felecia Davis | | |
| 2022 | Fashion Design | Willy Chavarria | | |
| 2022 | Landscape Architecture | Kounkuey Design Initiative | | |
| 2022 | Product Design | CW&T (Che-Wei Wang and Taylor Levy) | | |
| 2023 | Design Visionary | Seymour Chwast | | |
| 2023 | Climate Action | Biocement Tiles by Biomason | | |
| 2023 | Architecture | nARCHITECTS | | |
| 2023 | Interior Design | The Archers | | |
| 2023 | Communication Design | Arem Duplessis | | |
| 2023 | Fashion Design | Naeem Khan | | |
| 2023 | Digital Design | Clement Mok | | |
| 2023 | Landscape Architecture | Kongjian Yu | | |
| 2023 | Product Design | Atlason | | |
| 2023 | Emerging Designer | Beatriz Lozano | | |
| 2025 | Design Visionary | Kim Hastreiter | | |
| 2025 | Climate Action | ilumiNACIÓN by Resilient Power Puerto Rico | | |
| 2025 | Emerging Designer | Nu Goteh | | |
| 2025 | Architecture | Michael Maltzan Architecture | | |
| 2025 | Interior Design | Little Wing Lee | | |
| 2025 | Communication Design | Matt Willey | | |
| 2025 | Digital Design | Emerging Objects | | |
| 2025 | Fashion Design | Melitta Baumeister | | |
| 2025 | Landscape Architecture | TERREMOTO | | |
| 2025 | Product Design | Jules Sherman | | |
| 2026 | Design Visionary | Robert Earl Paige | | |
| 2026 | Climate Action | Estudio Teddy Cruz + Fonna Forman | | |
| 2026 | Emerging Designer | Mattaforma | | |
| 2026 | Architecture | Frida Escobedo Studio | | |
| 2026 | Communication Design | Thought Matter | | |
| 2026 | Digital Design | Laura Kurgan | | |
| 2026 | Fashion Design | Josh Tafoya | | |
| 2026 | Interior Design | Charlap Hyman & Herrero | | |
| 2026 | Landscape Architecture | Ten Eyck Landscape Architects | | |
| 2026 | Product Design | Berea College Student Craft | | |

== See also ==
- List of awards considered the highest in a field
- List of design awards
