= Gabellini =

Gabellini is an Italian surname. Notable people with the surname include:

- Gianfranca Gabellini (born 1938), birth name of Italian actress Scilla Gabel
- Lorenzo Gabellini (born 1999), Italian motorcycle racer
- Michael Gabellini (born 1958), American architect
- Stefano Gabellini (born 1965), Italian racing driver
