= Robert L. Tillman =

Robert L. Tillman (born 1943) is an American business executive who was chief executive officer (CEO) and chairman of Lowe's. He joined the company in 1962, held several management roles, and became president and CEO in 1996 and chairman in 1998.

== Early life and education ==
Tillman was born in 1943 in North Carolina. He studied at the University of North Carolina, where he earned a Bachelor of Science degree in 1967.

== Career ==
Tillman began his career at Lowe's in 1962 as an office manager trainee. He progressed through a series of management positions, including senior vice president of merchandising and marketing, executive vice president of merchandising, and executive vice president and chief operating officer. He joined the Lowe's board of directors in 1994, was appointed president and CEO in 1996, and became chairman in 1998.

Beginning in 1998, Tillman launched an expansion program that moved the chain beyond its traditional base in the Southern United States into the Northeast, Midwest, and Southwest, as well as into more urban locations. To facilitate expansion into the West, Tillman led the acquisition of Eagle Hardware. During his tenure, Lowe's achieved net earnings of $1 billion for the first time in 2001 and was named a Fortune 100 company.

== Recognition ==
Tillman School of Business is named after him.
