= Andrea Cochran =

American landscape architect

- Born: 1954 (age 71–72); New York City, New York, U.S.
- Education: Rutgers, Harvard Graduate School of Design
- Occupation: Landscape architect
- Website: https://acochran.com

Andrea Cochran (born 1954, New York City) is an American landscape architect based in San Francisco. She is a fellow of the American Society of Landscape Architects and one of seven designer women featured in the 2012 documentary Women in the Dirt.

== Early life and education ==
Cochran was born in New York City and grew up in northwestern New Jersey. For college, she had an early interest in attending art school but was dissuaded by family. She enrolled at Rutgers originally intending to study animal science before eventually transferring to landscape architecture after attending a lecture by the head of the program, Roy DeBoer. She received her undergraduate degree in 1976, then graduated from the Harvard Graduate School of Design in 1979 with a Masters of Landscape Architecture. In 1981, Cochran moved to the California Bay Area.

== Career ==
Early in her career, Cochran worked on the east coast and in Europe before relocating to California. She worked for The Planning Collaborative in San Francisco prior to forming the partnership Delaney, Cochran & Castillo, Inc. with fellow landscape architect Topher Delaney in 1989. In 1998, Cochran founded Andrea Cochran Landscape Architecture (ACLA). She became a fellow of the American Society of Landscape Architects (ASLA) in 2007. In 2014, she was awarded the ASLA Design Medal in recognition of her "body of exceptional design work at a sustained level for a period of at least ten years."

Cochran has frequently been lauded as a master of minimalism in landscape design. Her firm's award-winning projects often feature clean lines, minimalist structure, and edges defined by plantings en masse. Her influences include fellow landscape architects Dan Kiley, Garrett Eckbo, and James Rose in addition to artists Robert Irwin and Fred Sandback.

== Major awards and honors ==
- 2014 National Design Award for landscape architecture.
- 2019 Kirby Ward Fitzpartick Prize for Helen Diller Civic Center Playgrounds.
- 2020 ASLA Honor Award in Residential Design for 901 Fairfax Hunters View.
- 2017 ASLA Award of Excellence in Residential Design for Birmingham Residence.
- 2016 WLA Magazine World Landscape Architecture Award for Windhover Contemplative Center.
- 2016 Chicago Athenaeum: Museum of Architecture and Design and the European Center for Architecture, Art, Design, and Urban Studies for the Cochran Collection.
- 2015 Society of American Architects for Windhower Contemplative Center.
- 2015 Interior Design Magazine Best of Year Award- Outdoor Category for Windhover Contemplative Center.

== Major works ==
- Corn maze installation made from willow twigs, Sonoma Cornerstone, Sonoma, California
- Courtyard with reclaimed cypress, Curran House, San Francisco
- Outdoor furniture collection in collaboration with Landscape Forms, Inc.
