= Boym Partners =

American design studio

Boym Partners, Inc.
- Industry: Design
- Founded: 1986 (40 years ago)
- Founder: Constantin Boym
- Headquarters: New York City, New York, U.S.
- Key people: Constantin Boym; Laurene Leon Boym
- Website: www.boym.com

Boym Partners is an American design firm, based in New York City.

== History ==
Boym Partners was founded in 1986 by Constantin Boym in New York City and is run by Constantin and Laurene Leon Boym, who joined the firm in 1995. The firm is a multi-disciplinary design studio. The firm designs products and environments for its clients, in addition to creating self-produced artistic works. The firm has designed tableware for companies including Authentics and Alessi, as well as watches for Swatch, lighting for Flos, and showrooms for Vitra.

== Souvenirs ==
The company has also designed collectible objects. In 1997 it began producing a line called Souvenirs for the End of the Century, which marked iconic events from the 20th-century. It also produced the Buildings of Disaster project—a series of architectural miniature souvenirs depicting buildings that were the site of a historical disaster. Objects created included the Unabomber's cabin, the Oklahoma City Federal Building, Chernobyl, and the Lorraine Motel. After 9-11, the company added more items to the line, including The Pentagon and the World Trade Center. After the 2008 financial crisis, Boym Partners produced a line of replicas based upon skyscrapers that were not built due to the crash.

The projects developed by Boym Partners between 1985 and 2002 were the focus of the 2002 Princeton Architecture Press book Curious Boym: Design Works. In 2009, Boym Partners received the National Design Award in the Product Design category. A monograph about the firm's history and work, Keepsakes: A Design Memoir, was also published by Pointed Leaf Press in 2015.

== Museums ==
Projects developed by the company are housed in the permanent collection of the Museum of Modern Art in New York and the San Francisco Museum of Modern Art. Boym-designed exhibitions have also been shown in the National Building Museum in Washington, D.C., and the Cooper Hewitt, Smithsonian Design Museum. Boym Partners also designed the souvenir renderings of the Cooper-Hewitt's mansion home, using emoticons in the design. In 2009, its exhibition Timeless Objects, in which it coated everyday objects with bronze-like material to give them an artistic feel, was shown at the ExperimentaDesign in Lisbon, the Wright Gallery in Chicago, and the Cooper-Hewitt.
