= Margie Ruddick =

New York based landscape architect

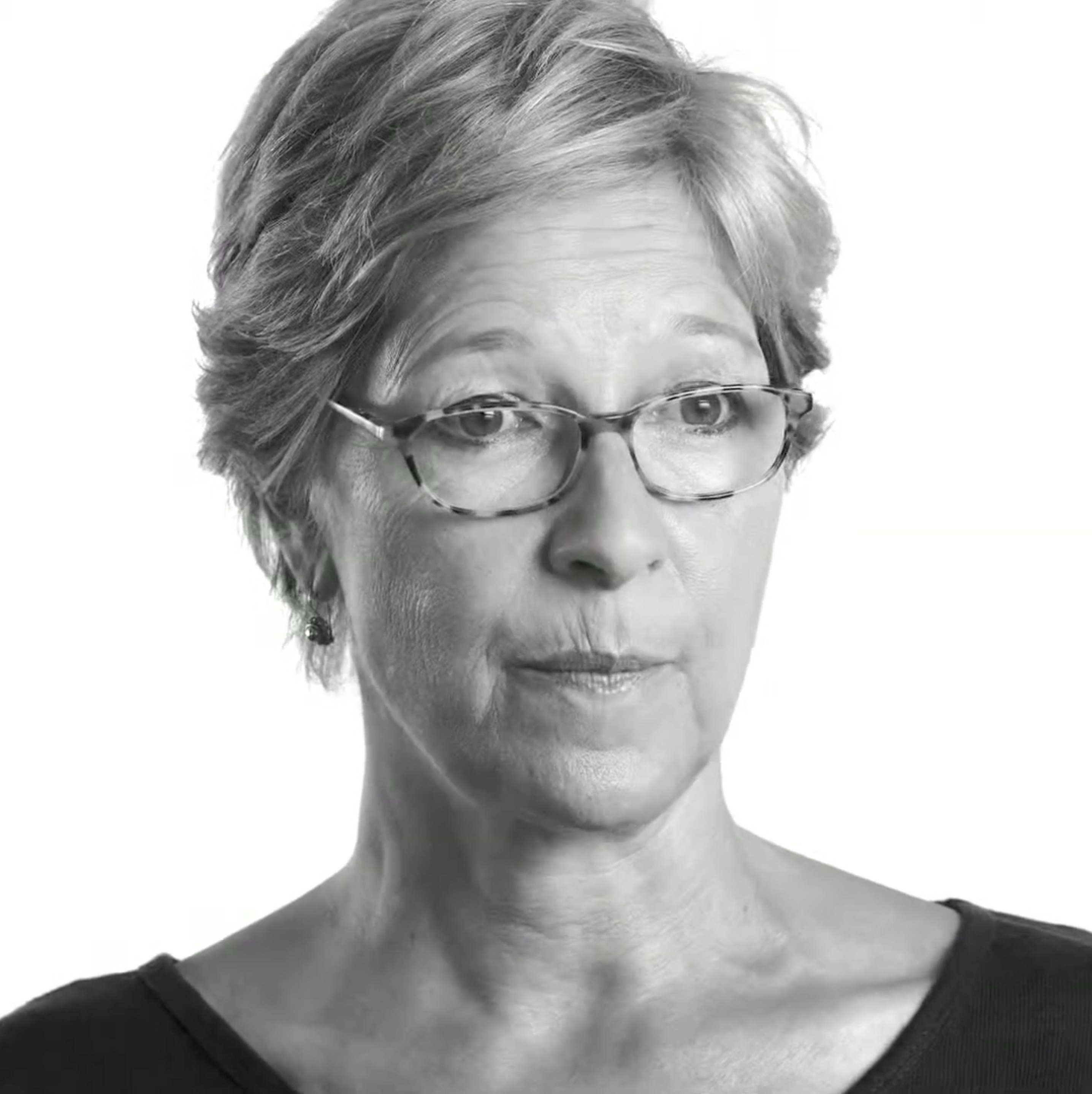
Ruddick in 2013

Margie Ruddick is a New York-based landscape architect. In 2013 she won the Cooper Hewitt National Design Award for landscape architecture. Her projects include designs at Queens Plaza Dutch Kills Green, Urban Garden Room, New York Aquarium Perimeter Project, Shillim Retreat and Institute, Casa Cabo, Baja California, and Bay Garden, Florida.

== Biography ==
She was born in Montreal, raised in Upper East Side, Manhattan, and earned her undergraduate degree from Bowdoin College before completing her graduate studies at Harvard University’s Graduate School of Design.

== Career ==
Her design work includes urban and international projects that combine ecological restoration with cultural sensitivity. One of her projects is the redesign of Queens Plaza in New York City, which aimed to transform a challenging urban space into a more sustainable and pedestrian-friendly environment. Internationally, Ruddick has worked on projects such as Living Water Park in Chengdu, China, which is considered the first ecological park in China, designed to clean polluted water biologically. She also contributed to the Shillim Institute and Retreat in the Western Ghats of India, focusing on reforestation and ecological restoration.

Ruddick has taught at several academic institutions, including Harvard University's Graduate School of Design, Yale, Princeton, and The University of Pennsylvania. She is also the author of Wild by Design: Strategies for Creating Life-Enhancing Landscapes (2016), in which she outlines her design principles and approach to landscape architecture.

== Awards ==
In addition to the Cooper-Hewitt National Design Award, Ruddick has received 1998 Waterfront Centre Award and the 1999 Places Design Award for her work on Living Water Park. She has also been awarded with the Rachel Carson Women in Conservation Award in 2006 and was named one of the top ten women in green design by the Green Economy Post in 2010.
