= Patricia Moore =

American designer and gerontologist

- Born: October 21, 1952 (age 73); New York
- Education: Rochester Institute of Technology, New York University School of Medicine, Rusk Institute of Rehabilitation Medicine, Columbia University
- Occupations: Industrial designer and gerontologist
- Known for: Universal Design

Patricia Moore (born 1952) is an American industrial designer, gerontologist, and author. She is one of the founders of the universal design philosophy.

Moore is a fellow of the Industrial Designers Society of America and in 2016 was named one of the Most Notable American Industrial Designers in the field. In 2012, she was inducted into the Rochester Institute of Technology's Innovation Hall of Fame. Hasselt University in Belgium awarded Moore an honorary PhD in May 2019 for "Inclusion and Excellence". Moore is the 2019 Recipient of the Cooper Hewitt Smithsonian Design Museum's National Design Award as "Design Mind", and the 2020 Center for Health Design's Changemaker Award. In 2022, she was presented with the World Design Organization's World Design Medal.

== Education ==
Moore earned her bachelor's degree from Rochester Institute of Technology, and completed her advanced studies in biomechanics at the New York University School of Medicine and the Rusk Institute of Rehabilitation Medicine. She earned graduate degrees in psychology and social gerontology from Columbia University.

== Research into design needs ==
Patricia Moore started her career in industrial design in 1974, working with Raymond Loewy International in New York City. In 1979, at the age of 26, she began an unusual sociological experiment to study the experiences of elders in North America. With the help of a makeup artist from Saturday Night Live, she disguised herself as an elderly woman and traveled throughout the United States and Canada, in guises that represented a range of health and wealth, to experience first-hand how elders manage their daily lives. "Old Pat", as she called herself, wore specialized makeup prostheses and her grandmother's clothes. To simulate common physical impairments such as arthritis and hearing loss, she put wax in her ears, taped her fingers to make them stiff under her gloves, and taped lightweight balsa wood on her knees. She had many positive experiences, such as people helping her, but many frustrations as well, such as trying to unwrap a piece of candy with stiffened fingers. Once, while she was out in her "Old Pat" disguise, she was the victim of a violent mugging by a group of boys, resulting in permanent injuries.

Her "Elder Empathetic Experiment" research project was completed in 1982, after visiting 116 cities in 14 states and two Canadian provinces. She published her findings in the book Disguised in 1985.

She has donated many of the artifacts from this research and the rest of her career, including her "Old Pat" disguise, to the Henry Ford Museum.

== Other projects ==
Moore was instrumental in developing Oxo Good Grips, a line of kitchen utensils that was developed to have larger, softer handles and are easier and more comfortable for people with arthritis to use, and which found a market much larger than people with severe arthritis. Moore described the line as "an iconic project that defined, finally, what universal, inclusive design looks like”. In 1994, the Museum of Modern Art put the Oxo Good Grips vegetable peeler in their permanent collection.

She has designed many rehabilitation facilities.

Moore was involved in the development of Depend incontinence products, which also found a market larger than originally expected.

She also helped draft part of the Americans with Disabilities Act of 1990.

Moore has also lectured at universities throughout North America, Australia, China, Europe, Korea, Japan, New Zealand, and Russia. She was the 1996 and 1997 Carnegie Mellon University Visiting Design Chair and is currently an adjunct professor of Industrial Design at Arizona State University.

== MooreDesign Associates ==
Moore & Associates, now MooreDesign Associates, was established in 1980 in New York City and now operates in Phoenix, Arizona. The company specializes in developing new products and services for the lifespan needs of consumers of all ages and abilities. Moore does not see the design work as centering around old age or disability, because any person can benefit from inclusive design features, sometimes as a result of changed circumstances, such as a broken leg.

Clients include: AT&T, Bell Communication, Boeing, Citibank, Corning Glass, General Electric, GTE, Herman Miller Healthcare, Honolulu Light Rail, Johnson & Johnson, Kimberly Clark, Kaiser Permanente, Kraft General Foods, Marriott, Maytag, NASA, Norelco, OXO, Pfizer, Playtex, Seoul Design City Project, Sky Train, Phoenix Sky Harbor Airport, Sunbeam, 3M, Valley Metro Rail, and Whirlpool.

== Professional associations ==
She is the co-author of the American National Standards Committee on Anthropometry. She has been a member of the Board of Trustees of the American Physical Therapy Association, the Harrington Arthritis Research Center, the Herberger Center for Design Excellence at Arizona State University, the Advisory Board of CARF (Certifying Association of Rehabilitation Facilities), and The American Occupational Therapy Association Foundation.

Moore is a Fellow of the Industrial Designers Society of America.

== Works ==
- 1985, Disguised: A True Story
- 2015, Ageing, Ingenuity & Design

== Legacy and honors ==
Moore has received the following recognition:

- 1996 Community Service Award of the American Rehabilitation Association
- 1996, American Hospital Association's 1996 NOVA Award for the "Family Road" Care Centers
- 1997, Professional Recognition Award by the Arizona Design Institute
- ID Magazine named her as one of the "40 Most Socially Conscious Designers" in the world.
- 2000, a consortium of news editors and organizations selected Moore as one of the "100 Most Important Women in America."
- 2000, ABC World News featured Moore as one of "50 Americans Defining the New Millennium."
- 2005, the American Occupational Therapists Association's annual Leadership Award
- 2006, the American Society of Interior Designers annual Humanitarian Award
- 2011, the Royal College of Art Inclusive Design Champion Award
- 2012, Syracuse University bestowed Moore with an honorary doctorate for serving as a “guiding force for a more humane and livable world, blazing a path for inclusiveness, as a true leader in the movement of Universal Design.”
- 2012, The Rochester Institute of Technology inducted Moore as a member of the “INNOVATORS Hall of Fame”.
- 2013, WTS presented Moore with their "Innovative Transportation Solutions Award"
- 2016, Industrial Designers Society of America Most Notable American Industrial Designer
- 2019, U of Hasselt Belgium Honorary Doctorate in Architecture
- 2019, the National Design Award for "Design Mind"
- 2020, the Center for Health Design CHANGEMAKER Award
- 2022, World Design Organization's World Design Medal
