= Doris Sung =

American architect and educator

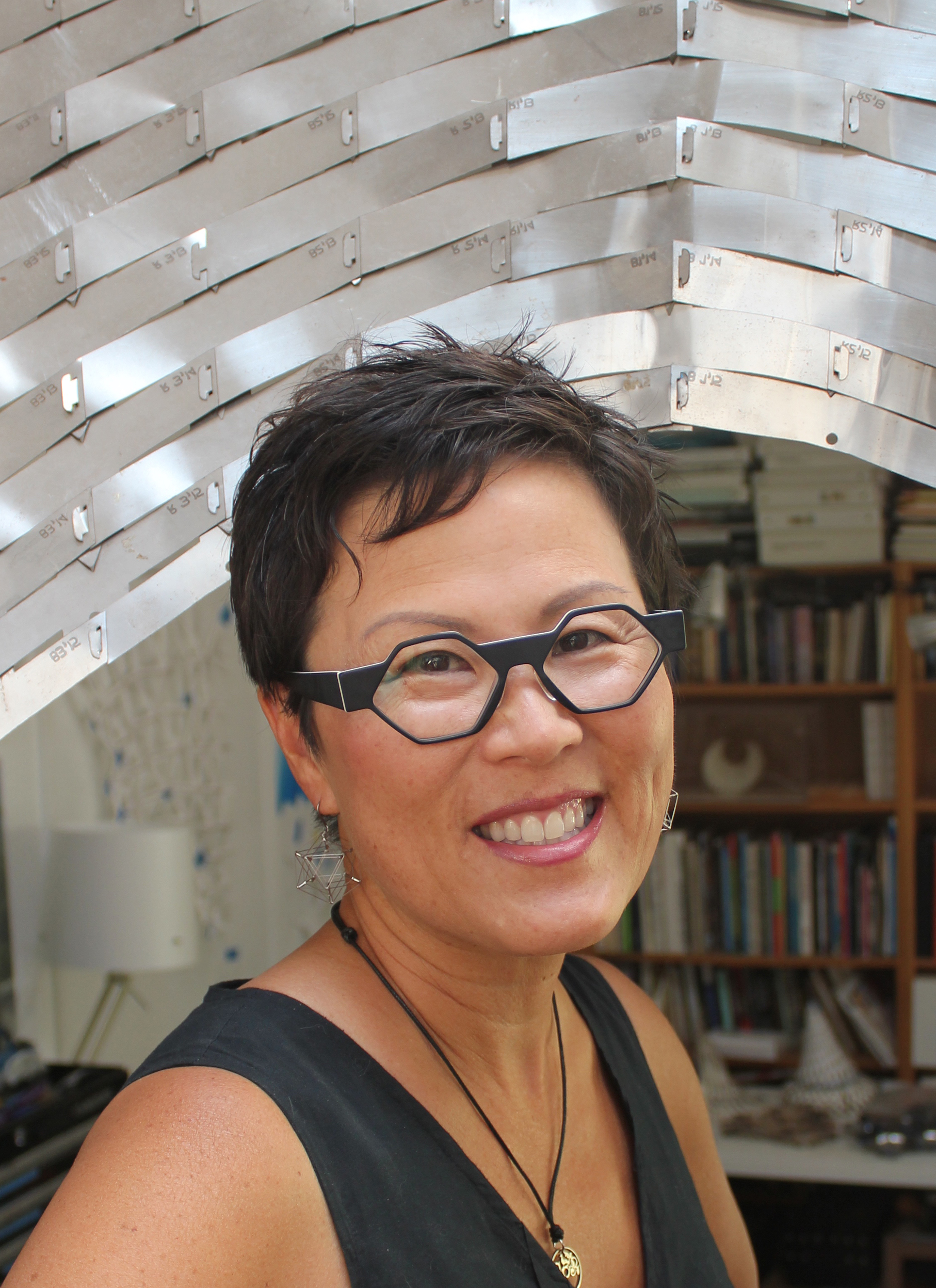
- Doris Sung in her office
- Born: Doris Kim Sung; 1964 (age 61–62)
- Occupation: Architect
- Awards: National Design Awards
- Practice: DO-SU Studio Architecture
- Design: Invert Self-Shading Windows

Doris Kim Sung (born 1964 in Hollywood, California) is an American architect and educator. Sung served as the Director of the Undergraduate Programs at the USC School of Architecture starting in 2020 until 2024.

== Education ==
Sung graduated from Princeton University in 1986 with a Bachelor of Arts in Architecture, Sung earned a Master of Architecture degree with distinction from Columbia University in 1990.

== Work ==
With a focus on smart materials, like thermo bimetals, Sung explores non-conventional architectural applications driven by geometry and her background in biology. Some notable projects include Bloom, a stitched sun-tracking instrument, Invert, a no-energy sun shading system exhibited at the Carolyn Campagna Kleefeld Contemporary Museum at the California State University, Long Beach, and Fuller, a self-structured sculpture at the South Coast Botanic Garden.

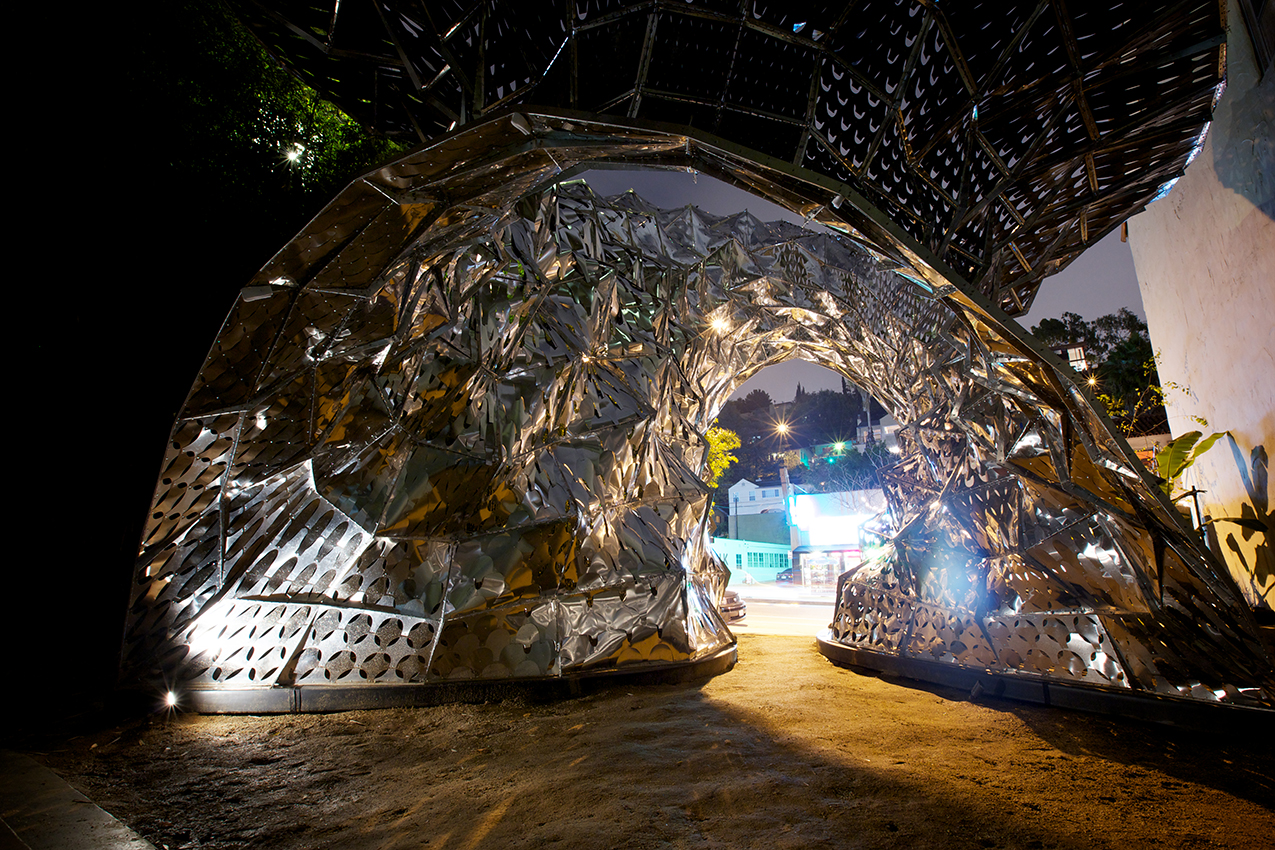
Bloom by DOSU.

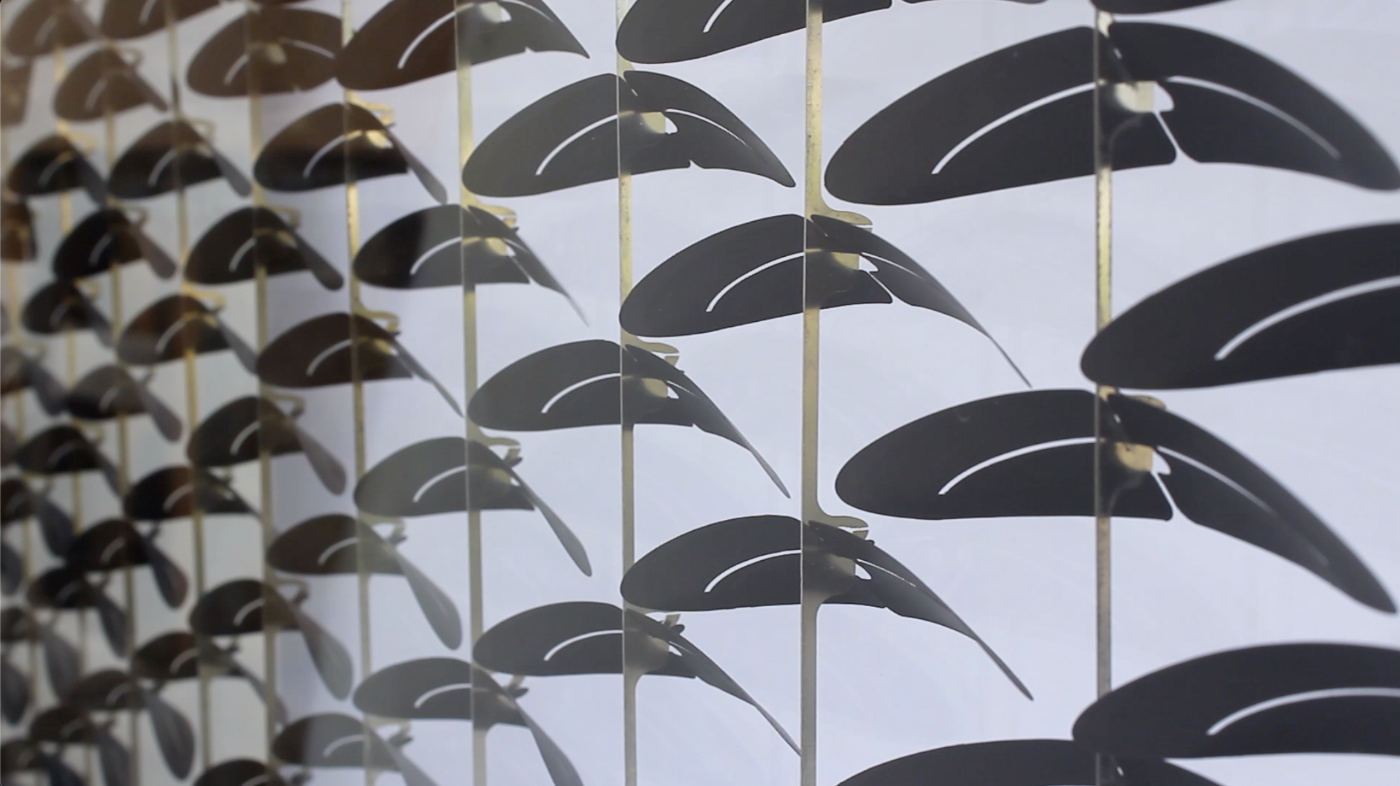
Metal geometries in Invert Shading System by TBM Designs

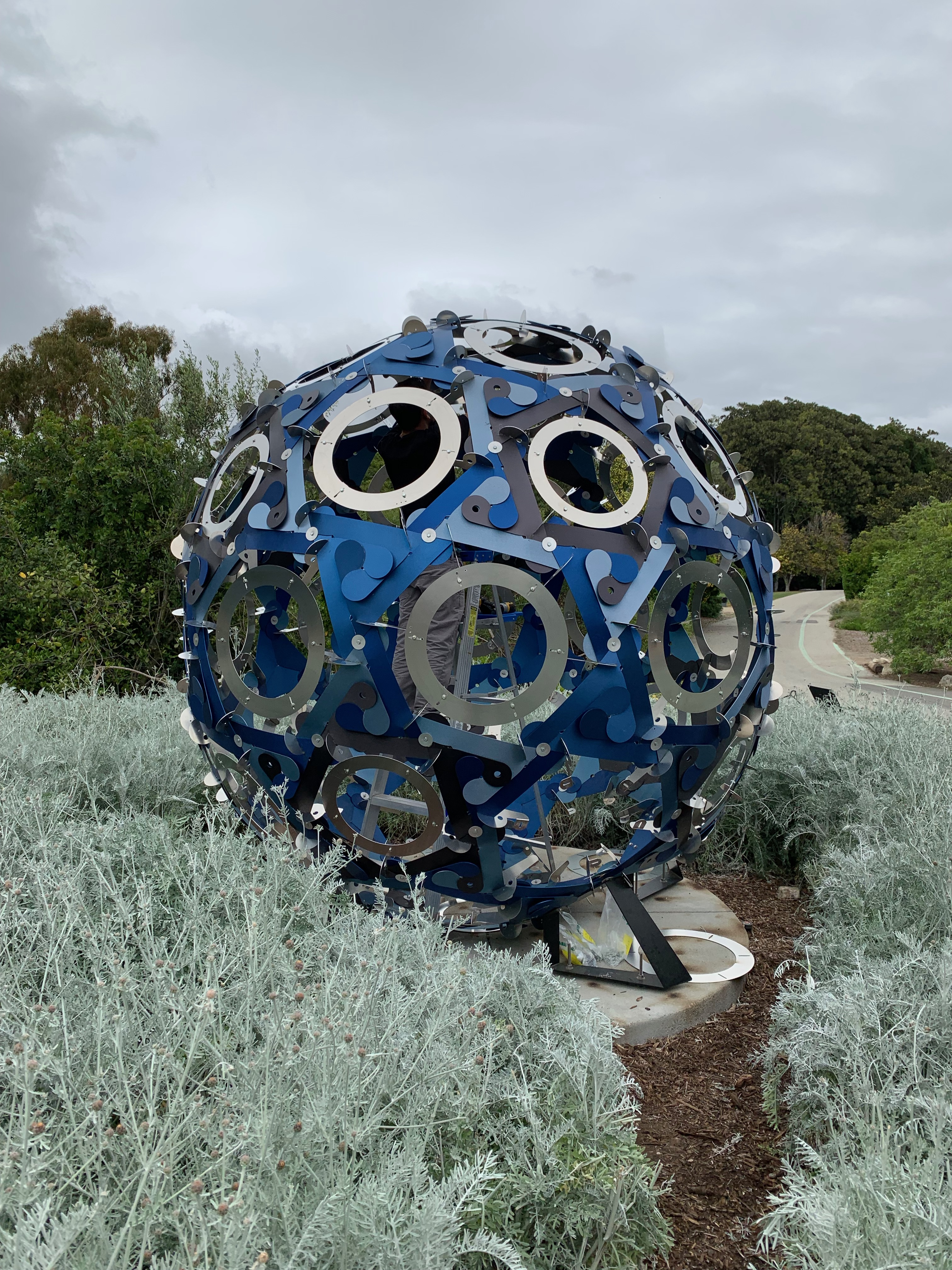
Fuller Art Installation by DOSU

== Career ==
Sung began a tenure-track position at the University of Colorado in Denver in 1997. During this period, Sung started her firm DOSU Studio Architecture with work predominantly in the start-up tech industry, and received several American Institute of Architects (AIA) awards for her designs. In 2001, Doris moved to Los Angeles for a position at Southern California Institute of Architecture. In 2006, she started teaching at the University of Southern California (USC). Around this time, Sung converted her practice into a research-based one. She was granted tenure from USC in 2016. She is a co-founder of TBM Designs LLC, a start-up company for smart building products that makes Invert Self-Shading Windows.

== Awards ==
The Invert window system received several innovation awards, including a 2021 National Design Awards in the Climate Action category, 2020 R&D Award from Architect Magazine, and recognition by Architectural Record as a Best Architectural Product in 2019. Sung was also a finalist for the Women4Climate Tech challenge in 2020.

At Princeton, Sung was a recipient of the Grace May Tilton Award.
