= Katrina Cottage =

Small residential shelters designed and marketed in the USA after Hurricane Katrina

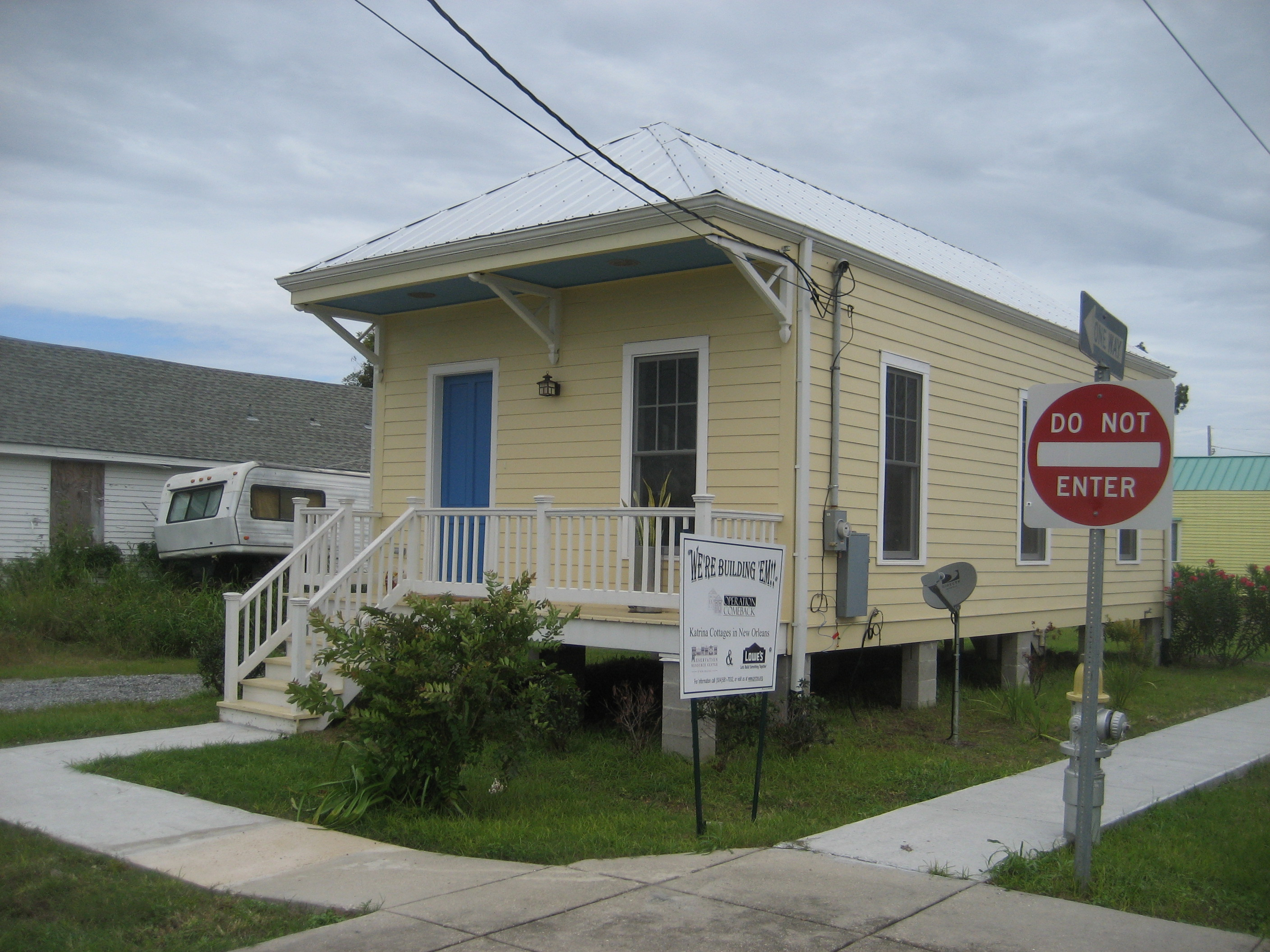
Katrina Cottage in the Lower 9th Ward

Katrina Cottages or FEMA Cottages are small residential shelters designed and marketed in the United States in the wake of Hurricane Katrina (August 2005). They were designed as a response to the inadequacies of the trailers issued to flood victims by the Federal Emergency Management Agency (FEMA). The homes' designs attempt to fulfill the needs of their occupants in a more permanent and humane manner, while addressing the challenges of building and protecting a home in the Gulf Coast region, particularly in southern Louisiana where much of the land currently used is below sea level and protected by levees. The cottages are also common in parts of storm surge damaged coastal Mississippi. Though designs may vary, the main aesthetic criterion is that Katrina Cottages resemble traditional homes in the area in appearance, scaled-down in size to reduce costs and ease construction so that multiple units can be built quickly as needed.

The best-known of these designs are those by Marianne Cusato, whose original "Katrina Cottage" made the term popular and received in 2006 the first annual People's Design Award from the Cooper-Hewitt Museum of the Smithsonian Institution. As Cusato's design and others gained increasing media attention, the number of designs has increased, as has interest in smaller dwellings as a whole. Home improvement retailer Lowe's offered pre-packaged Katrina Cottage kits, including plans and all materials needed for construction. A FEMA pilot program accommodating 900 Mississippi coast families encountered strong opposition from local government officials opposed to permanent small housing units, fearing they would lower property values. On the other hand, Mississippi Governor Haley Barbour urged local officials to accept the cottages as safer than trailers.

Initially offered through Lowe's stores in Mississippi and Louisiana, in 2008 Lowe's began offering the cottages at all of its stores nationwide. However, although initially "hailed as the new Sears & Roebuck house," by mid-2011 Lowe's had discontinued its product line.

== See also ==
- Kit house
- Small house movement
