= Blu Dot =

American furniture company

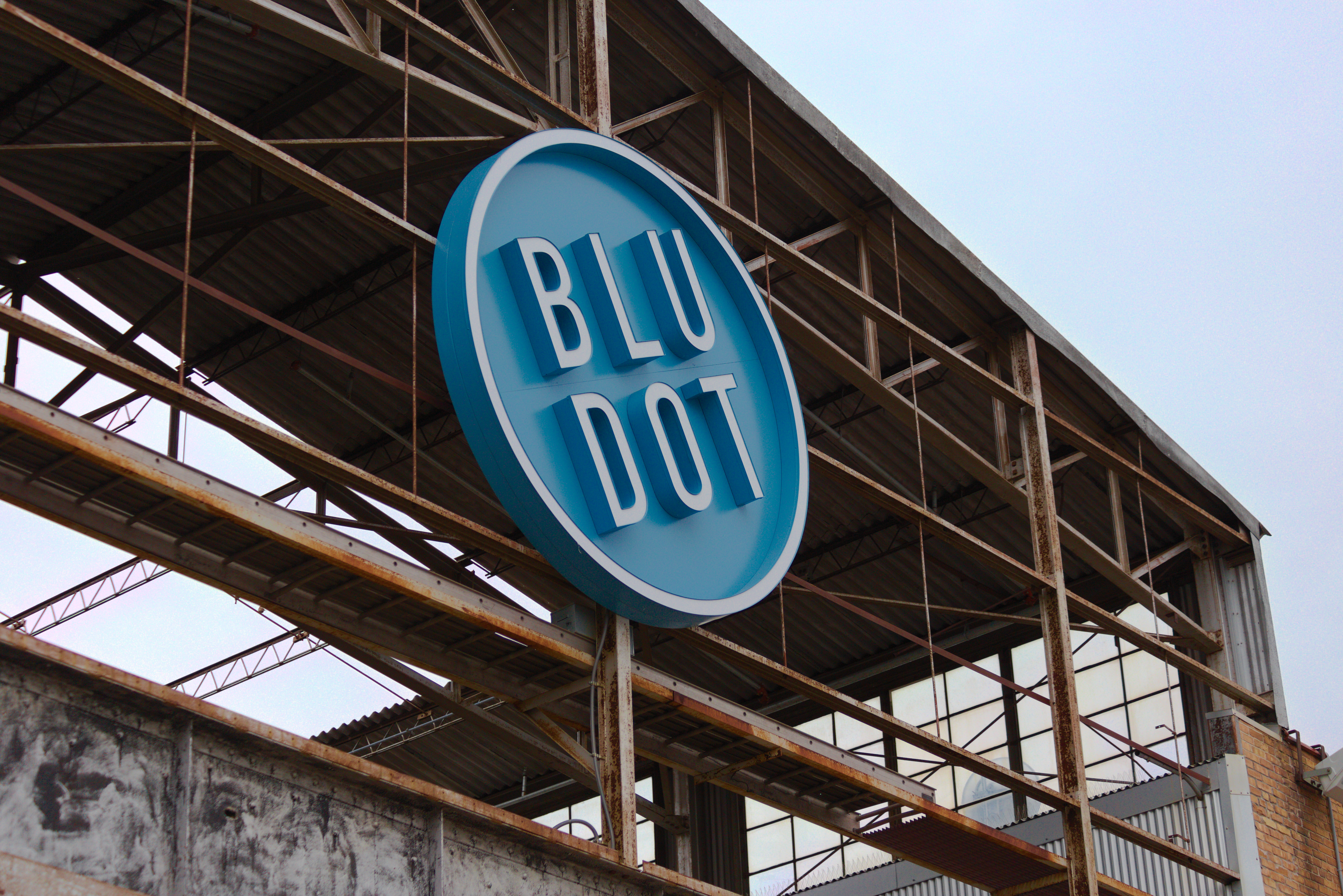
- Industry: Furniture
- Founded: 1997; 29 years ago in Minneapolis, Minnesota, United States
- Founders: Maurice Blanks; John Christakos; Charlie Lazor
- Headquarters: Minneapolis, Minnesota, United States
- Website: BluDot.com

Blu Dot is an American modern furniture retailer based in Minneapolis, Minnesota. It operates 17 retail locations in the United States, Mexico, and Australia.

== History ==
In 1997, Blu Dot was founded by Maurice Blanks, John Christakos, and Charlie Lazor. The trio conceived the idea during a backpacking trip across Asia in 1988, after graduating from Williams College.

In April 2008, Blu Dot received a $10 million growth equity investment from private equity firm CHB Capital Partners.

In 2018, Blu Dot received the Product Design award at the Cooper Hewitt National Design Awards.
