= Marianne Cusato =

American architect

Marianne Cusato is a designer, educator, author, and urban designer based in Miami, Florida. She was the designer of the 300-square-foot (28 m^{2}) "Katrina Cottage," conceived in 2005 as an alternative to the FEMA emergency trailers supplied to some of the newly homeless survivors of Hurricane Katrina along the Mississippi Gulf Coast. In 2006, Cusato entered into a licensing agreement with the Lowe's Home Centers to make the cottages available in kit form in all Lowe's stores nationwide or the plans alone online.

She is a representative of New Urbanism and New Classical Architecture.

== Early life and education ==
Cusato was born in 1974 and raised in Anchorage, Alaska and in Kenai, Alaska. She holds a Bachelor of Architecture from the University of Notre Dame and has said of Notre Dame, “What I learned from Notre Dame was ‘how to learn.’”

== Designer ==
Cusato moved to New York in 1999, taking a job with the firm Fairfax and Sammons, designers of expensive houses with classical detailing. Of the lessons learned there she has said, "You need to know the rules before you know which ones to break."

In October 2005, Haley Barbour, then Governor of Mississippi, hired New Urbanist planner Andres Duany to advise him regarding the rebuilding effort. Duany invited a team of architects, including Cusato, to spend part of October with him in Biloxi, Mississippi at the Mississippi Renewal Forum. The architects were challenged to design an alternative to the FEMA trailers then in use. Cusato designed a vernacular, traditional-looking, 300-square-foot (28 m^{2}) hurricane-proof house which became known as “the little yellow house” and which won numerous awards and was sold in kit form nationwide at Lowe's The design earned her numerous industry and humanitarian awards, among them a People’s Design Award from the Cooper-Hewitt National Design Museum.” Of the cottage Duany said, "People fell in love with it."

== Educator, Public Speaker, Author ==
Cusato is a public speaker on topics including "The Value of Design," "Sustainability: Community, Home, Architecture, Materials," "Affordable Housing," "Gulf Coast Rebuilding," "Katrina Cottage," "Get Your House Right," and "Is Small the New Big?"

Cusato is a member of The Institute of Classical Architecture and Art and is a consultant for developers, builders, and architects designing and building traditional buildings. She is a proponent of building design that reflects and values classical design in addition to the architectural history of its prospective inhabitants. She is an outspoken architecture critic and theorist and has authored or co-authored two books on architecture and design.

== See also ==
- Small house movement

== Bibliography ==
- Marianne Cusato with Daniel DiClerico, The Just Right Home: Buying, Renting, Moving - Or Just Dreaming - Find Your Perfect Match! Workman Publishing, 2013.
- Marianne Cusato with Ben Pentreath, Richard Sammons, and Leon Krier, Foreword by HRH The Prince of Wales: Get Your House Right: Architectural Elements to Use and Avoid. Sterling Publishing, 2008.
- Marianne Cusato: The Value of Design. James Hardie, 2008.
