= Open Style Lab =

Nonprofit organization

Open Style Lab (OSL) is a nonprofit organization that was launched in 2014, initially as a public service project at the Massachusetts Institute of Technology. The nonprofit's executive director and board president is Grace Jun. The organization designs and produces adaptive clothing and products, with and for people with disabilities. The group invites designers, engineers, and occupational therapists from across the globe to work together to solve a real-life problem with an adaptive clothing solution. The program was replicated at MIT International Design Center and at Parsons School of Design at The New School.

Every Summer, the group puts together cross-functional teams including designers, engineers, and occupational therapists, that are paired with a 'client' who has a disability. The teams then have 10 weeks of research, design, and development to put together a solution for their client. The group has worked with those people with spinal cord injuries and cognitive disability for their designs, such as adaptive sewing toolkits.
