= Studio One Eighty Nine =

Fashion social enterprise

- Formation: 2013
- Founders: Abrima Erwiah and Rosario Dawson
- Headquarters: Accra, Ghana
- Region served: West Africa
- Products: Luxury artisanal handmade pieces
- Website: studiooneeightynine.com

Studio One Eighty Nine is a fashion social enterprise based in Ghana and the United States. Its goal is to promote African and African-inspired fashion. It has its own label and supports other brands. Studio One Eighty Nine's co-founders, Hollywood actress Rosario Dawson and former Bottega Veneta communications executive Abrima Erwiah, created Fashion Rising in 2013 in honor of V-Day Movement's One Billion Rising campaign.

== Origins and development ==
Dawson and Erwiah started Studio One Eighty Nine after visiting several African countries in February 2011, as part of V-day. They believe that increasing the market share of the fashion industry and encouraging traditional techniques will lead to social change.

Studio One Eighty Nine is partnered with the United Nations International Trade Centre's Ethical Fashion Initiative.

== Distribution ==
Studio One Eighty Nine creates womenswear, menswear and home goods, ranging from apparel and shoes to accessories and pillows. The brand is sold online on their ecommerce site, in addition to other external points of sale. Studio One Eighty Nine has also partnered with Vogue Italia and YOOX and have released an exclusive collection for this platform with proceeds benefiting the charity Fashion 4 Development. The collection can also be found at Opening Ceremony, Smithsonian, Maison de Mode, Free People, Parisi, the Surf Lodge, and Biffi Boutiques.

== Accolades ==
Dawson and Erwiah received the Taormina Humanitarian Award at the 61st Taormina Film Festival in June 2015. In January 2015, Dawson and Erwiah were awarded the Martin Luther King Junior Award on Social Justice from the University of Pennsylvania.

They have also received positive reviews from fashion magazines and newspapers like Vogue Italia, WWD, Grazia, Vanity Fair Italia, El País, The Wall Street Journal, Bloomberg Business, ABC News and The New York Times. Erwiah was one of the 100 people featured by TRUE Africa for her role in Studio One Eighty Nine.

The Spring/Summer ‘15 and ‘16 collections were showcased at the Lower East Side Girls’ Club as a part of New York Fashion Week. In 2014 and 2015, Studio One Eighty Nine was selected to be featured as part of Design Indaba’s “Africa is Now” exhibit in Cape Town and Durban, South Africa.
