= Michael Gabellini =

American architect

- Born: 1958 (age 67–68); Allentown, Pennsylvania, US
- Education: Rhode Island School of Design
- Occupations: architect, designer
- Spouse: Nancy Spector
- Children: 1

Michael Gabellini (born in 1958), FAIA, is a minimalist architect, interior designer and partner of Gabellini Sheppard Associates with Design Partner, Kimberly Sheppard and Consulting Partner, Daniel Garbowit. A Fellow of the American Institute of Architects, he won the National Design Award for Interior Design in 2006 and has also been recognized with the Progressive Architecture Award and awards from the American Institute of Architects, the International Interior Design Association, among other professional societies and publications.

== Life and career ==
Gabellini was born in 1958 near Allentown, Pennsylvania, and earned his Bachelor of Fine Arts degree and Bachelor of Architecture degree from the Rhode Island School of Design. He also studied at the Architectural Association in London and conducted architectural research in Rome. It was at the Architectural Association where Gabellini was mentored by influential architects such as Rem Koolhas, Elia Zenghelis, Nigel Coates, Bernard Tschumi, Dalibor Vesely and Zaha Hadid.

After graduation, he worked for six years with prominent architecture firm Kohn Pedersen Fox Associates in New York. During this time, he also collaborated on residential and fashion related projects with interior designer Jay Smith, before founding the architecture and interior design firm Gabellini Associates in New York in 1991. The name was later changed to Gabellini Sheppard Associates, after Sheppard and Garbowit (now retired) became full partners in the practice.

The firm's earliest commissions, for fashion designer Jil Sander, led to a 14-year collaboration spanning over 80 retail spaces worldwide with the brand. One of the earliest, a Paris boutique in a restored private house on Avenue Montaigne, was noted by Architectural Record in September 1993 for its “clean elegance,” noting that the boutique furthered Gabellini's reputation “for designing minimalist spaces enriched by sumptuous materials.” Nearly a decade later, the Jil Sander Flagship in London, England won an American Architecture Award in 2002 from the Chicago Athenaeum Museum of Architecture and Design. Gabellini Sheppard Associates' completed the renovation of Top of the Rock at Rockefeller Center in 2006, completely revamping the six level, 55,000 square-foot project to include new public spaces as well as restoration of the historic observation decks. The project won the Institute Honor award for Interior Architecture as well as an Honor award for Historic Preservation from the American Institute of Architects. In subsequent years, the firm continues to develop retail, public and exhibition projects while expanding their practice into hospitality and residential design (single and multi family). The firm was appointed by Marriott and hotelier Ian Schrager to design the European debut of the EDITION hotel brand, EDITION ISTANBUL. In March 2014, real estate development firm Sumaida + Khurana announced the collaboration between Tadao Ando and Gabellini Sheppard Associates on Tadao Ando's first residential project in NYC. In fall of 2014, the firm's redesign of the iconic Rainbow Room at Rockefeller Center will open to the public.
