= Fragmentology =

Study of manuscript fragments

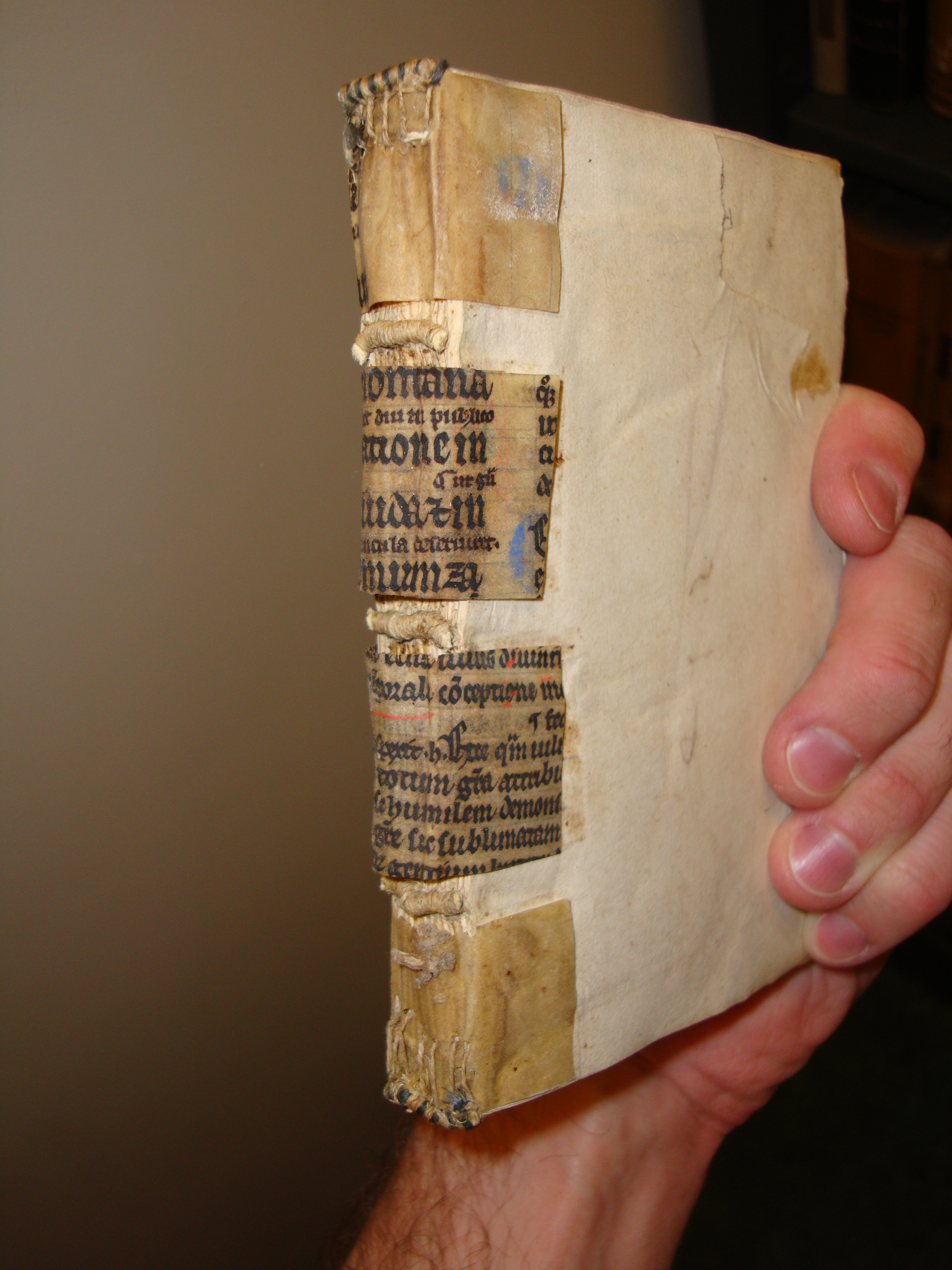
Fragments of 12th-century glossed Bible reinforcing book spine (outer cover removed), Yale Law School library

Fragmentology is the study of surviving fragments of manuscripts (mainly manuscripts from the Middle Ages and the Renaissance in the case of European manuscript cultures). A manuscript fragment may consist of whole or partial leaves, typically made of parchment, conjugate pairs or sometimes gatherings of a parchment book or codex, or parts of single-leaf documents such as notarial acts. They are commonly found in book bindings, especially printed books from the 15th to the 17th centuries, used in a variety of ways such as wrappers or covers for the book, as endpapers, or cut into pieces and used to reinforce the binding. In other non-Western manuscript cultures, fragments of paper manuscripts and other materials, takes place beside parchment, including board covers that many times reused written paper.

In recent years, fragmentology has become an active part of scholarly medieval studies fueled by the abundance in institutional libraries of binding fragments that have never been studied or even catalogued. A number of symposia, websites and projects have been formed to pursue the study. In their field-defining editorial, William Duba and Christoph Flüeler note that fragmentology's "transdisciplinary nature requires the collaboration of specialists trained in a range of fields, not just paleography, codicology, and diplomatics, but also the history of the printed book, the history of libraries, musicology, art history, intellectual history, digital humanities – in sum, most historical arts dealing with content on a page."

== Fragments used in bookbindings ==
Leaves and parts of parchment leaves have been used in bindings of manuscripts since the Middle Ages. The use of manuscript fragments in bindings increased greatly at the end of the 15th century when printed books began to appear in increasing numbers, supplanting many older manuscripts. The conversion of northern Europe to Protestantism and the closing of monasteries and convents resulted in the discarding of many Catholic religious and liturgical manuscripts some of which were used by bookbinders. Sometimes, manuscript fragments have been removed from bookbindings either because the fragments were viewed as significant or valuable, or in the course of rebinding. Removal of these fragments destroys important context and evidence and is strongly criticized by scholars. Where it is necessary to remove such fragments, accepted practice requires they be preserved with the book and their original location recorded.

== Evidentiary value of fragments ==
Manuscript fragments may provide a variety of useful evidence for medievalists, bibliographers and paleographers, including:

- Preservation of a unique or rare text or other writing.
- Preservation of early or significant script.
- Evidence where a book was bound. Since medieval manuscripts generally did not travel far from where they were produced, the fact that a binding incorporates fragments of a manuscript from a known location may be evidence that the book was bound there or nearby.
- Evidence concerning the book binder. The fact that fragments of the same manuscript are found in various bookbindings may connect the bindings, perhaps to a specific binder.
- Evidence of ownership or provenance.
- The internal and external structure of the bookbinding.

== Modern breaking of manuscripts ==
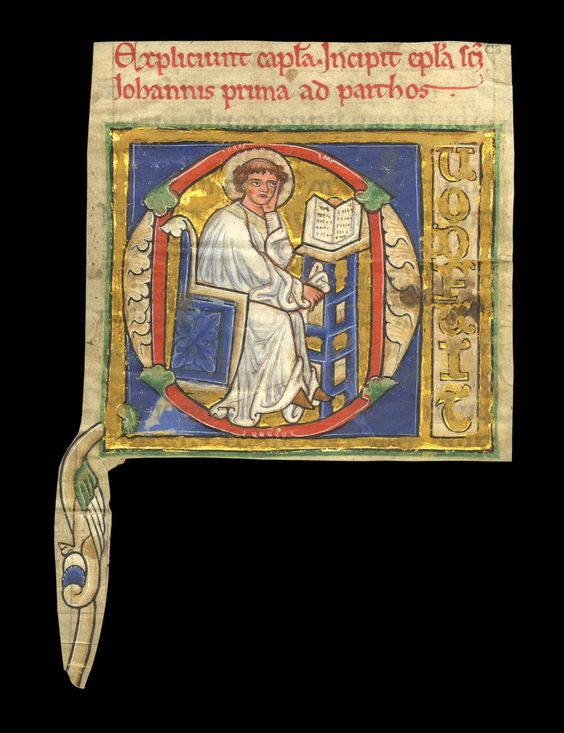
Illuminated letter with painting of John, cut out from 13th-century manuscript

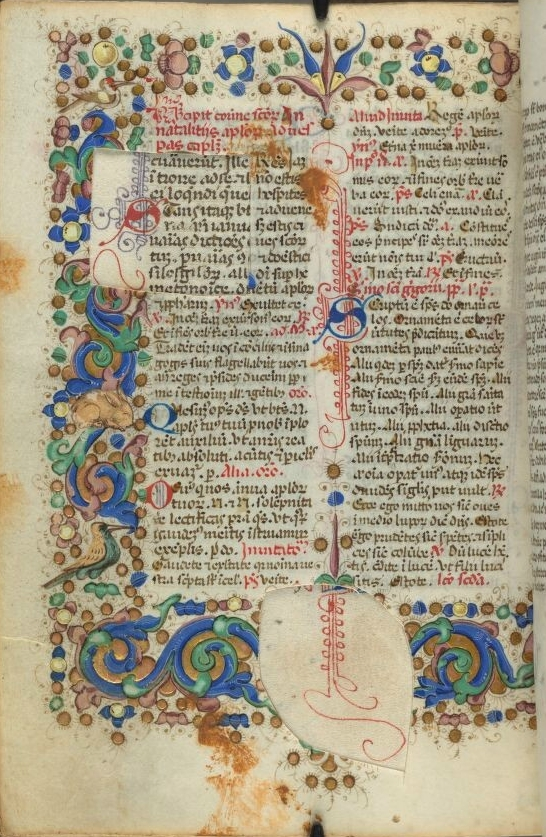
Franciscan Breviary, Italy (1465), with illuminated letters cut out

Beginning in the nineteenth century, collectors cut ornamented initial letters and miniatures from illuminated manuscripts. In the twentieth century some book dealers began removing leaves from manuscripts to be sold for greater profit as individual pages or keepsakes. This "breaking" of manuscripts has been most common with books of hours which contain illuminated pages, gilding and attractive decorations. "As a result, today there are tens of thousands of single leaves in several hundred U.S. collections." This practice continues today and many individual leaves of books of hours and antiphonals are available on eBay and from book and manuscript dealers. Scholars strongly condemn this practice, even where the manuscript is incomplete to begin with, as it destroys the integrity and evidence of the entire manuscript. The most famous or infamous manuscript breaker was Otto Ege, who dismembered many complete and fragmentary manuscripts to sell the leaves individually or in large boxed collections.

== Digital fragmentology ==
Scholars have studied Otto Ege's dismemberment and sale of manuscript leaves and have attempted to locate the present locations of the leaves of some of those manuscripts. A number of online projects have been started to collect images of these and other manuscript leaves in a virtual reconstruction of the original manuscripts, including Fragmentarium, based in Switzerland (Institute for Medieval Studies of the University of Fribourg, Centre for Studies in Manuscripts). This has been referred to as "digital fragmentology". Websites have also been used to identify and date manuscript fragments through crowdsourcing.

== Gallery ==
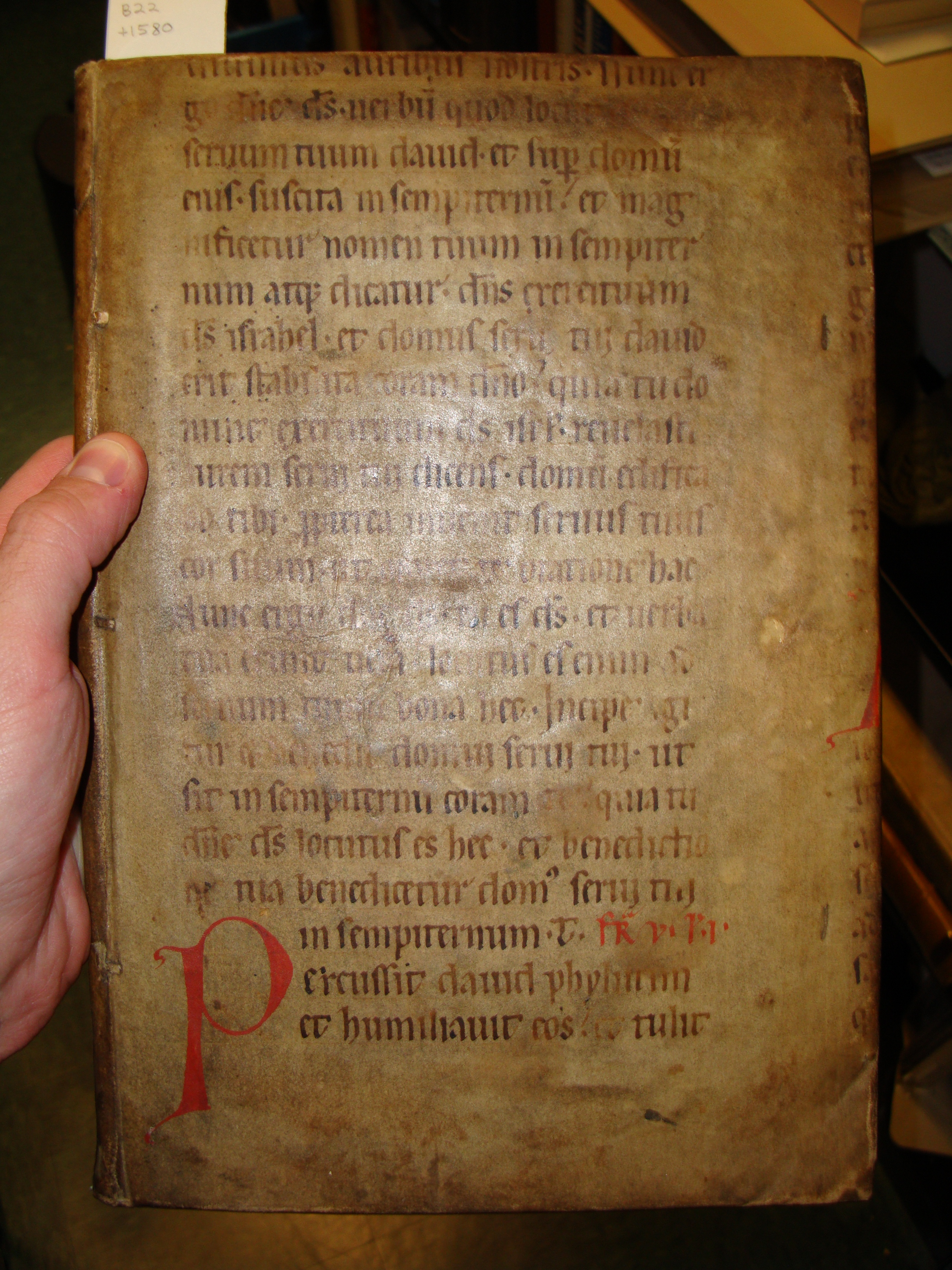
Manuscript leaf used as cover

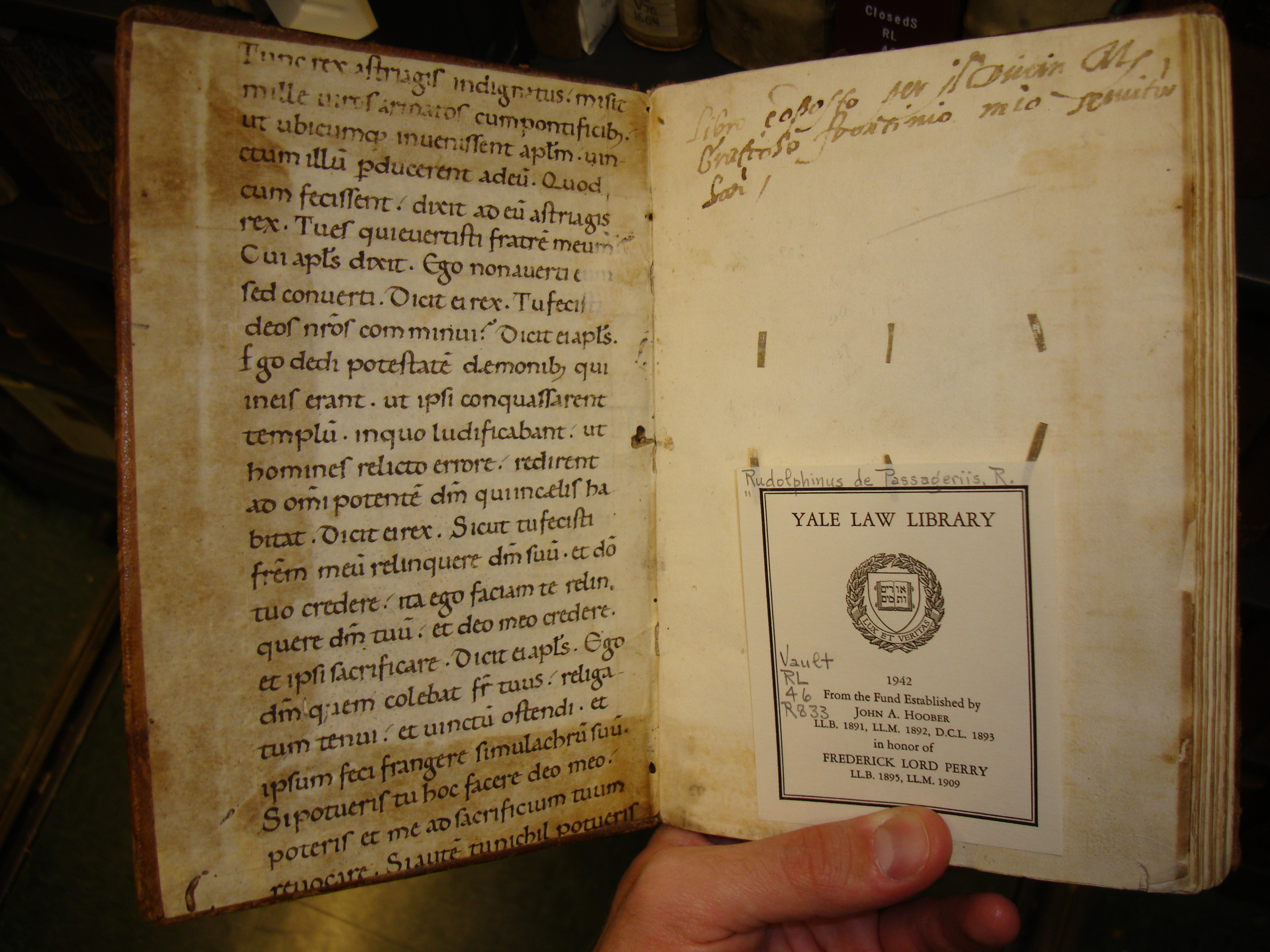
Manuscript leaf used as pastedown

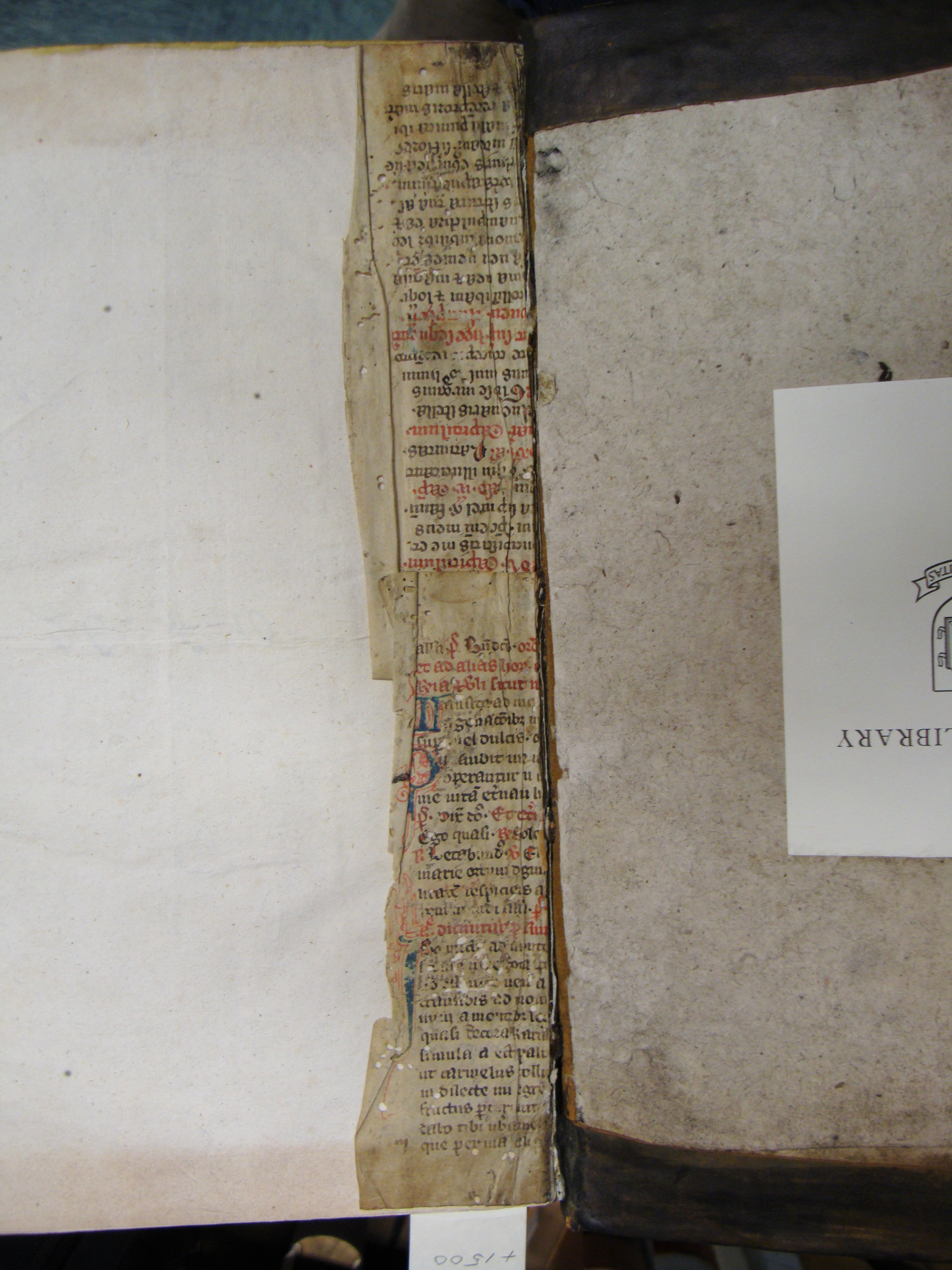
Manuscript leaf used as hinge reinforcement

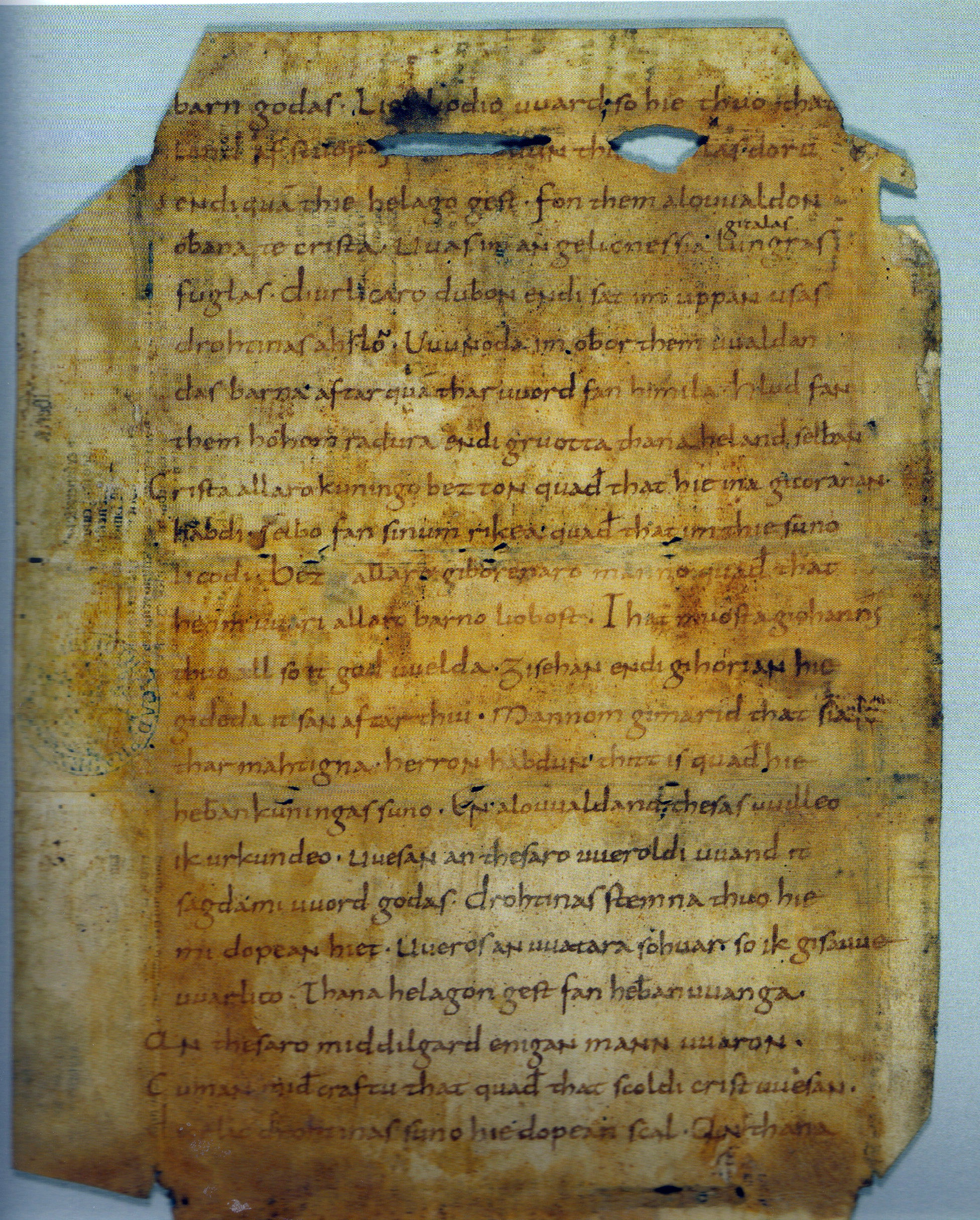
Manuscript leaf removed from book cover

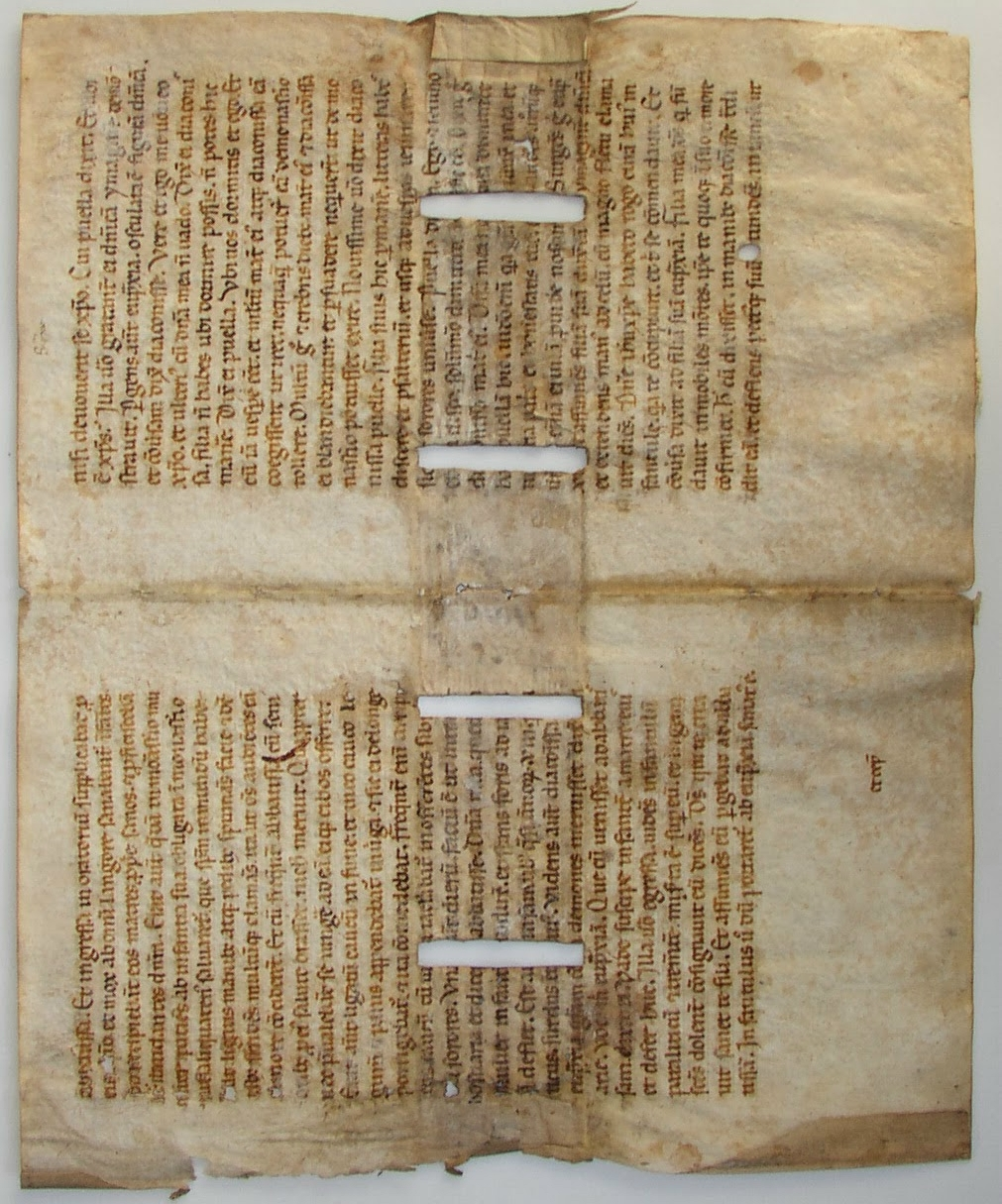
Book cover of manuscript leaf with slits for binding cords

== See also ==
- Codicology (the study of manuscript codices or books as physical objects)
- Paleography (the study of old handwriting and scripts)
- Otto Ege
  - Beauvais Missal – a 13th-/14th-century manuscript fragmented by Ege
- Binding waste (the sheets or fragments themselves)
- Cairo Geniza
- European geniza
