= Paul Johnston (printer) =

Paul Johnston (July 17, 1899 – February 18, 1987) was among the printers and artists who defined a new American style of printing, typography and book design in the 1920s and 1930s.

== Life ==
Johnston began his fine press printing career with Egmont Arens' Flying Stag Press in Greenwich Village, New York City. Flying Stag Press published Drawings by Rockwell Kent: A Portfolio of Prints, 28 black and white illustrations, in 1924. Now part of the bohemian Village scene, while still working for Arens, PJ set up his own press, intending to publish a magazine of new literature, like Transition in Paris and Broom in Italy. Then, having a different idea, he published the material in six pamphlets called The Latterday Pamphlets. He showed an editor at Random House his work along with a proposal to print fine press editions of the country's best contemporary poets and writers.

The Poetry Quartos, a limited edition of 475 copies, designed and printed at his press in Silvermine, Connecticut, was published by Random House in 1929. The Poetry Quartos consisted of one booklet for each poem by twelve well-known poets, with an illustration by PJ on each cover. All the booklets were then enclosed in a folder. The poets were Robert Frost, Genevieve Taggard, Vachel Lindsay, Edwin Arlington Robinson, Theodore Dreiser, Elinor Wylie, William Rose Benét, H.D., Louis Untermeyer, Alfred Kreymborg, Conrad Aiken, and Witter Bynner. The Prose Quartos appeared in 1930 in a limited edition of 875 copies, and included the work of Stephen Vincent Benét, Sherwood Anderson, Conrad Aiken, Carl Van Vechten, Louis Bromfield and Theodore Dreiser.

During the next fifteen years, Johnston moved back and forth between the Village and Woodstock, New York, which was flourishing as an artistic community. In Woodstock, Hervey White hired him to be the editor and advertising manager of Hue And Cry, the weekly artistic newspaper. In the early 1930s Johnston wrote and published The Book Collector's Packet. About the same time, in March 1932 he published 250 copies of The Crow's Nest Funerealities by the poet Peggy Bacon.

=== Career in literature ===
Johnston's critique of the art of printing contributed to the spirited debate of the times. In Beauty and The Book: Fine Editions and Cultural Distinction in America, Paul Johnston commented: "It should be obvious that there would be more vitality in an activity concerned with contemporary letters and book design" rather than reprints of European classics which taxed fine press printers' resources. He favored instead creating a new, modern American style of literature, graphic arts, book design and printing.

Johnston's book, Biblio-Typographica: A Survey of Contemporary Fine Printing Style, published by Covici-Friede in 1930, is a standard book on typography. It was based on research and his articles and correspondence with fine press printers and typographers. The articles were published previously in The American Collector, The Bookman, The Atlantic Monthly Bookshelf, Book Chat, The Nation, Books, The Publishers' Weekly, and The American Printer. In Biblio-Typographica, Johnston analyzed the work of William Addison Dwiggins, Daniel Berkeley Updike, Bruce Rogers, Stanley Morison, and others, showing the development of an American style, with spare clean lines, as opposed to the European style, through these innovators.

"Bruce Rogers," Johnston said, "in 1899 or so was working for Houghton Mifflin. D. B. Updike was a very careful and thoughtful printer. Both Updike and Bruce Rogers had nobody to lead them in their styles, but themselves. They had only the history of good printing to look back on, and they were making their contributions to a movement that started in the 1400s, well, I would say, 1500, it began to take on a very distinctive style.... I found an unknown New York printer who had, like Updike, a style of neat printing, and they were printing dissertations of students and politicians and poetry, in the 1790s, to put some style in their work: T & J Swords. So I researched and did a story on them. When Updike began in Boston in early 1900s, he had nothing to guide him but his own good taste in printing. He was not imitating because there was no style in printing. Rogers was up against the same thing."

Johnston's article on the American type designer Frederic Goudy appeared in The Fleuron, published by Stanley Morison. His correspondence with Frederic Goudy and the typescript manuscript for this article are in the Providence Public Library (Rhode Island) Special Collections.

His other books include My Typographical Tour, published in 1933, and Frederic W. Goudy, American Typographer, 1930, both in the possession of the New York Public Library.

=== Legacy ===
Johnston's papers were acquired in 1979 by the New York Public Library for its Special Collections. This collection of Johnston's book arts papers include his book covers, mockups, layouts, lettering, writings on typography, history of printing and manuscript preparation, and correspondence with Elmer Adler, publisher of The Colophon, A Book Collectors' Quarterly, Bennet Cerf of Random House, George Macy, Desmond Flower, Dard Hunter, Oliver Simon, W. A. Dwiggins, Eric Gill, Burton Emmett, and Sir Francis Meynell, founder of Nonesuch Press. This acquisition also included the work of printmaker Joseph Low. PJ was one of the founding members of the Typophiles, an association of typographers and fine printers. After starting several small presses, he worked for Van Rees Press in Greenwich Village, designing books for trade and university publishers, including the University of North Carolina Press.

The Will Ransom Papers, Roger and Julie Baskes Department of Special Collections at the Newberry Library, Chicago, Illinois, has a selection of Johnston's papers. The Harry Ransom Center of the University of Texas at Austin, has Johnston's letters to Egmont Arens (1932–34) and Frieda Lawrence (1934) in the D. H. Lawrence Collection.

=== Personal life ===
Johnston, "PJ," was born July 17, 1899, in Augusta, Georgia. He met his wife, Virginia Fitzwater, in Woodstock, New York. With the help of Egmont Arens, they eloped to Vermont, and were married in the home of Rockwell Kent. "Carl Ruggles played the wedding. And instead of her father, Rockwell Kent gave the bride away." After marrying, Johnston worked for Alfred A. Knopf Publishing Company for one year.

Johnston's interest in contemporary literature began as a teenager in Atlanta, when he read Bruno's Weekly, edited by Guido Bruno, and Quill. Both magazines were published in New York City's Greenwich Village. A few years later, he read the literary and artistic magazine Playboy (named for Synge's "The Playboy of the Western World"), published by Egmont Arens and his wife, the poet Josephine "Jo" Bell. In 1919, Johnston moved to Greenwich Village and visited Arens.

Johnston became good friends with Bobby Edwards, the publisher of Quill and a ukulele maker and player, who performed in the Greenwich Village Follies. Quill chronicled the 1920s Bohemian Village scene in a tongue-in-cheek style, assessing its unique characters and social and artistic trends.

For many years, Johnston lived in a garret on the third and top floor of 128A West 10th Street, on the corner of Greenwich Avenue, the former home of Egmont Arens.

His diary began after his divorce and near fatal hospitalization in mid-life, and was thousands of pages long, typed single-spaced on onion-skin paper. He called it "The Document," his "lifelong stream of consciousness."

In the 1950s Johnston worked on Textile Design. During the 1960s and early 1970s he attended many of the Happenings at the Judson Memorial Church. One of his companions was the dancer and performer Olga Adorno. He wrote notes on many Off Broadway and Off-Off Broadway plays. From 1978 to 1980 he published several booklets in chapbook form. Among them were an excerpt from his unpublished novel, Tender Branch, and his philosophy in Words. His concept of "living consciously alive" carried on the 1920s Greenwich Village "revolution of consciousness."

Johnston died at St. Vincent's Hospital in New York City on February 18, 1987.

== Bibliography ==
- The Poetry Quartos, printed and illustrated by Paul Johnston, New York: Random House (1929)
- The Prose Quartos, printed and illustrated by Paul Johnston, New York: Random House (1930)
- Biblio-Typographica: A Survey of Contemporary Fine Printing Style, by Paul Johnston, illustrated with examples; cloth, 1050 copies printed at the Southworth Press, New York: Covici-Friede (1930)
- The Book Collector's Packet: A Miscellany of First Editions, Bibliography, Typography & Kindred Literary Matters, Woodstock, New York
- Article, Egmont Arens, "Rockwell Kent-Illustrator," The Book Collector's Packet, 1.9 (1932)
- The Crow's Nest Funerealities, Peggy Bacon, New York (1932)
- Words, by PJ, New York (1980)
