= Lisa Fagin Davis =

American medievalist

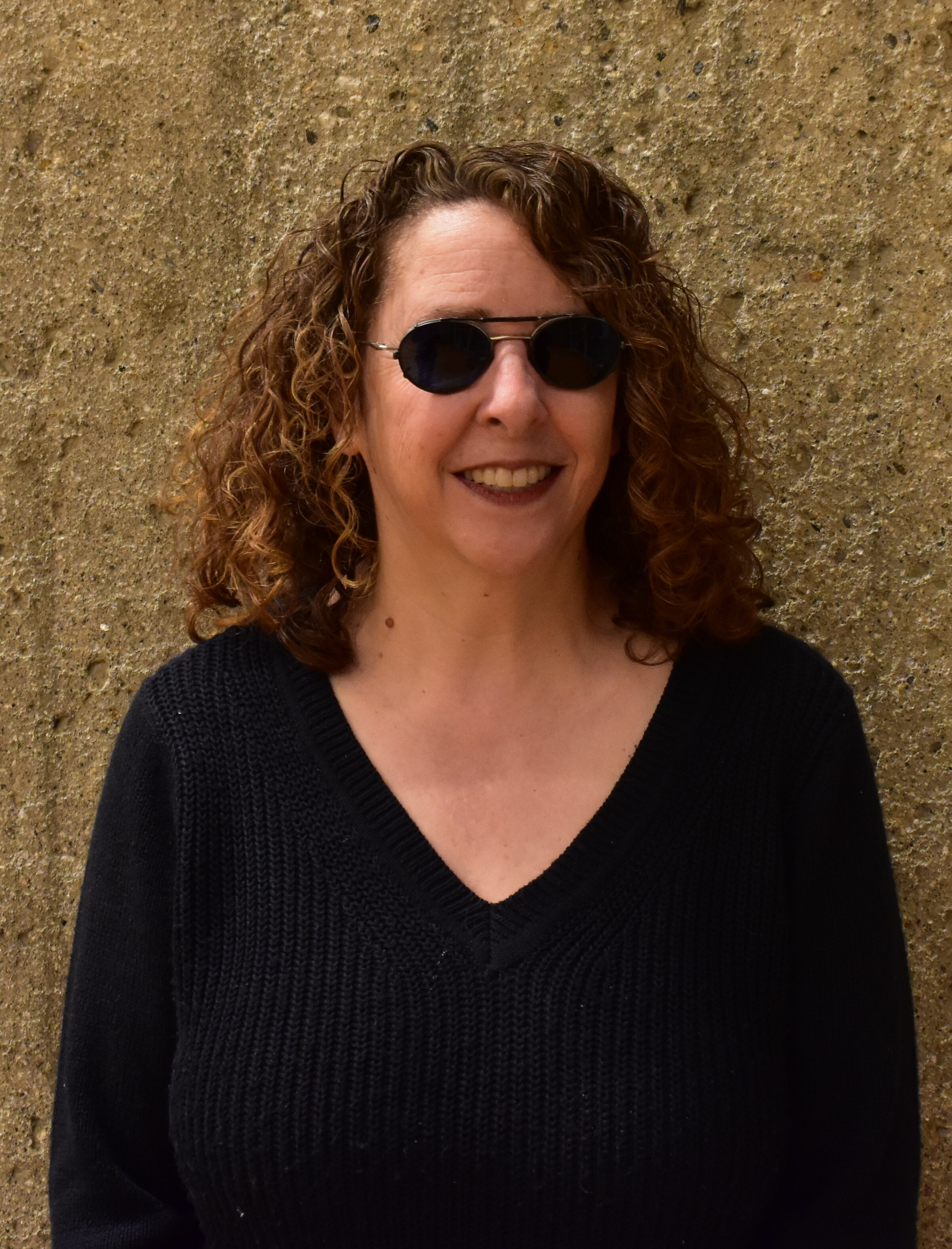
- Davis in 2026
- Born: 1965 or 1966 (age 59–60)

Academic background
- Education: Brown University (BA); Yale University (MA, PhD)

Academic work
- Discipline: Medievalist
- Sub-discipline: Codicology and Paleography
- Institutions: Medieval Academy of America

Lisa Fagin Davis (born 1965 or 1966) is an American medievalist, codicologist, and paleographer. She is the executive director of the Medieval Academy of America.

== Early life ==
Davis is the youngest of three siblings. Her brother is the journalist Dan Fagin. She has a visual impairment that causes double vision, and thus wears purple-tinted sunglasses both indoors and outdoors.

Davis received her bachelor's degree in medieval studies from Brown University in 1988, and her Ph.D. from Yale University in 1993. Her dissertation focused on the historical context of the Gottschalk Antiphony, a fragmentary manuscript. She later used the program Fragmentarium to create a virtual reconstruction of the manuscript.

== Academic career ==
Davis has catalogued medieval manuscript collections at Yale University, the University of Pennsylvania, the Boston Public Library, and other universities as well as private collections. In 2013, she was appointed as the Executive Director of the Medieval Academy of America. In 2013, she started her blog Manuscript Roadtrip which focuses on the stories behind manuscript collections and their provenance across the United States. This was a part of a project to assemble an online directory of pre-1600 manuscripts in university, library, and other collections.

In 2016, Davis was a curator of the exhibition Beyond Words: Illuminated Manuscripts in the Boston Area, which was spread throughout three locations in the Boston Area and featured over 250 manuscripts. Currently, she is an adjunct professor of manuscript studies at Simmons Graduate School of Library and Information Science and instructor of Latin paleography and fragmentology at the Rare Book School.

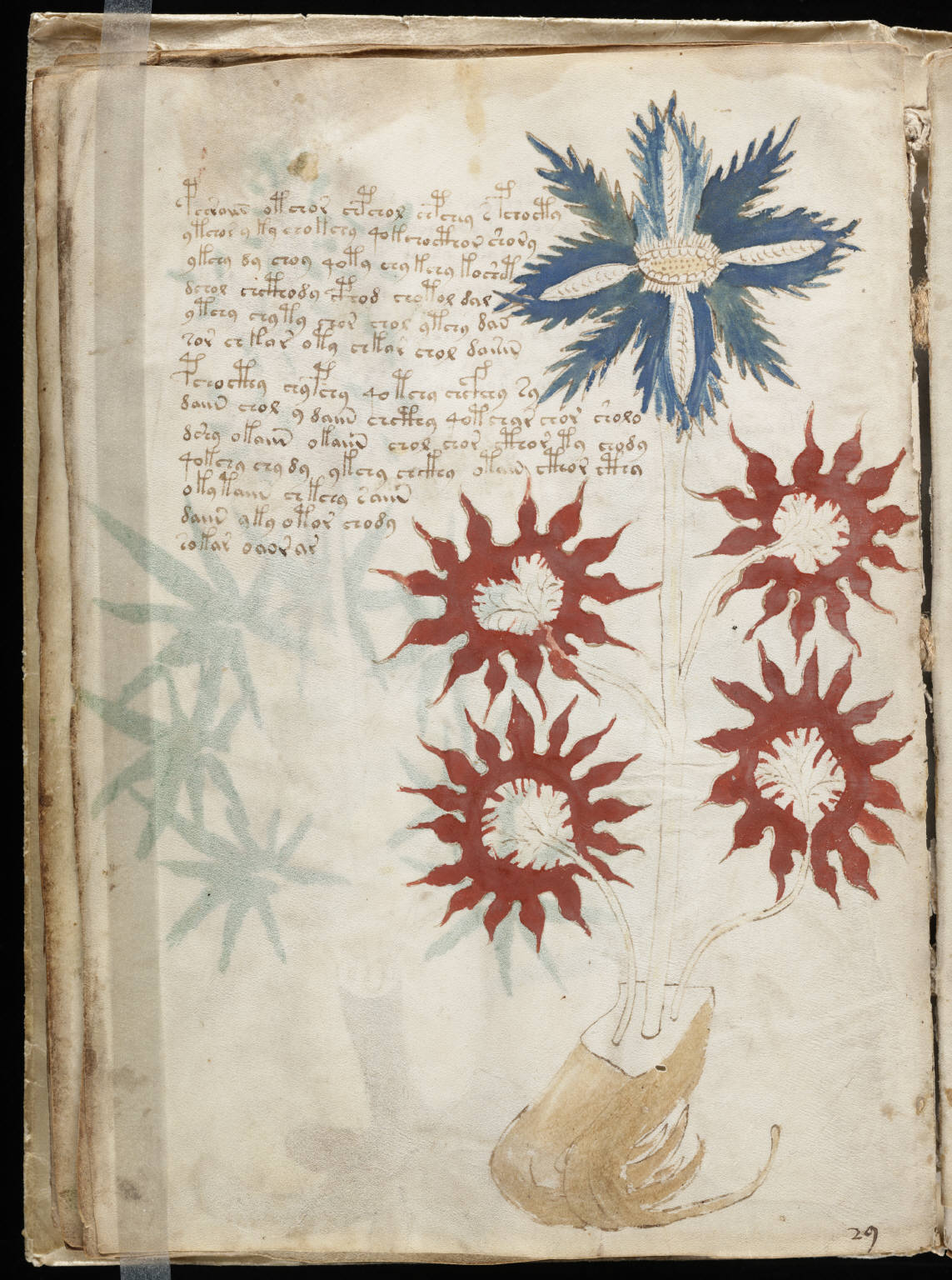
A page from the Voynich Manuscript

While at Yale, Davis was responsible for responding to letters about the Voynich Manuscript, an undeciphered manuscript in the Beinecke Rare Book and Manuscript Library. In a 2020 paper, Davis analyzed handwriting differences and concluded that the Voynich Manuscript was likely the work of five scribes. In 2024, Davis analyzed multispectral images of the manusript that had been taken by The Lazarus Project 10 years earlier. She discovered a string of Roman letters in the document's margins, likely remnants of an early deciphering attempt.

Davis has been working to digitally reconstruct the Beauvais Missal, a 14th-century French manuscript that was separated by Otto Ege. As of 2022, she has tracked down over 100 out of 309 pages. In 2022, when a suspected folio turned up in Waterville, Maine, she was consulted by Colby College to help authenticate the page.
