= Beauvais Missal =

14th-century French missal from Beauvais Cathedral

- Leaf from a Missal with Two Historiated Initials: Initial P[er omnia saecula saeculorum] (A Priest Celebrates Mass) and Initial V[ere dignum et iustum est] (Ecclesia and Synagogue) Cleveland Museum of Art
- Material: Ink, Tempera, Gold Leaf on Vellum
- Height: 28.5
- Width: 20
- Created: late 13th century
- Present location: Various Collections
- https://fragmentarium.ms/overview/F-4ihz

The Beauvais Missal is a Medieval missal dating to the 1290s. It was among the liturgical books of the Beauvais Cathedral in Beauvais, France, for well over 490 years, up until dispersal from the French Revolution. Passing from collector to collector, it made it to the manuscript collection of William Randolph Hearst, who eventually sold it to book dealer Philip C. Duschnes in 1942, where subsequently him and his friend Otto Ege, separated the book into several singular folios.

Considered a textbook tragedy of the destruction of a medieval manuscript for the sake of collecting in the 19th–20th centuries, where one folio can sell for a higher profit margin than a whole book, the manuscript has dispersed into many museums and private collections. There has been an effort underway to reconstruct the manuscript digitally, and over the courses of years, the discovery of pages has come into public spotlight.

== Composition ==
The Missal, which was a composition of 309 leaves composes of a calendrical guide containing the prayers, chants, and guides for the Mass for the Catholic Church.

In the 13th century, the Missal was standardized into one book, called the Missal Plenum (Latin: "Full Missal").

The Beauvais Missal was written approximate at the turn of the 14th century, under the ownership of Robert de Hangest, a canon to the Beauvais Cathedral. It is speculated that the artist of the manuscript may have been the same artist who composed the Book of hours of Yolande of Soissons (Morgan Library MS.M.729), as through documents, Hangest lived 10 miles northwest of Amiens, where the alleged artist lived.

The Missal has been attributed to a workshop called the "Cholet Group", based on the similarities of the initials, figures and marginalia to that of the Bibliothèque de l’Arsenal MS 25.

On September 1356, sensing his death, Hangest donated the Missal to the cathedral as listed in the registers of Beauvais in exchange for an annual remembrance mass for him on his passing. He died 3 November 1356.

== Provenance and separation ==
The Missal was in the cathedral's inventory for centuries, documented in four centuries later in the 17th century, but during the Dechristianization of France during the French Revolution, the library of Beauvais was dispersed.

In 1843, a commercial broker of Lyon, Henri Auguste Brölemann, gilt and bound the manuscript, wherein it was passed through descent to great-granddaughter Madame Etienne Mallet.

On 4 May 1926, it was sold at Sotheby's to an antique bookdealer William Permain for £970 who represented media mogul William Randolph Hearst, who brought it from London to the United States. He subsequently sold the manuscript in 1942 to Philip Duschnes.

Duschnes, and his friend, Otto Ege, a teacher at Case Western Reserve University and Cleveland Institute of Art dismantled the book, selling folios for $25–40 to increase the profit margins of the book. As such the manuscript has been separated into fragments since then.

== Digital reconstruction ==
There has been recent efforts reconstruct the manuscript through digital means, in the years since the death of Ege, as the folio has been dispersed in many collections all over the world. The effort under is helmed by Lisa Fagin Davis, professor of manuscript studies at Simmons University as well as director of the Medieval Academy of America.

As of December 2023, 122 pages of the 309 have been identified and reconstructed, all of which are identified from the same volume as they compose of the rites of summer feasts, as well as Easter and Advent.

Manuscript folios continue to show up on the market to this day.

In 2022, a folio emerged at an estate sale in Waterville, Maine, purchased for $75. The page was then authenticated by Davis and the faculty of Colby College.

Subsequently, in October 2022, a folio featuring entries for the feast of St. Callixtus and St. Lucian was authenticated by Davis upon acquisition to the University of Connecticut's Archives & Special Collection by School of Nursing Faculty Prof. Thomas Long, who acquired the piece in the late 1990s.

Currently, the bulk of the manuscript is held in New England by UMass, UConn, Rhode Island School of Design, Harvard, Yale, Smith, Wellesley, Dartmouth, and Colby College, in addition to the Wadsworth Atheneum and Boston Public Library.

Additional fragments are currently held worldwide, including Oslo Cathedral, Waseda University, and France.
