= Elmer Adler =

Elmer Adler (July 22, 1884 – January 11, 1962) was a book designer, collector, and graphic design educator.

== Biography ==
Adler began collecting books and prints while working at his family's clothing firm in Rochester, New York. Since Adler was 14, he was collecting beautiful and unusual books, He was not a successful student and was asked to forth his school. His father put him to work in his family business, L. Adler, Bros & Co. Alder was a salesman and later got promoted to an advertising manager.

Throughout his time in Rochester, Adler was a participant in cultural activities. In 1915, he organized a Whistler exhibit at the Memorial Art Gallery. In the 1920s Adler organized another exhibit, but this exhibit suggested the direction of his life. From this exhibit, Adler knew his future was in books and printing.

At the age of 38, Adler left his family clothing business to take on a new profession. In 1922, he established Pynson Printers in New York City and began designing books with Burton Emmett and John T. Winterich. Pynson worked on publications including the New York Times and the American Mercury, and limited edition books for publishers including Alfred A. Knopf and Random House. In 1930, he began publishing The Colophon, A Book Collectors' Quarterly. He ended the publication in 1940 when he was invited to establish a Department of Graphic Arts at Princeton University. He retired from Princeton in 1952. In 1955, he established an art-of-the-book program, La Casa del Libro, in Puerto Rico. La Casa del Libro opened in 1956. In 1947, he received the AIGA Medal.

He died January 11, 1962.
