= Burton Emmett =

Burton Emmett (1871 – May 6, 1935) was an advertising copywriter and executive in New York City.

== Biography ==
Burton Emmett was born in 1871 in Lee, Illinois to William and Susan Emmett. In 1895, he graduated from Northwestern University and became a book agent. Emmett married Mary Pratt Emmett.

In 1908, he became a copywriter at the advertising agency, Lord & Thomas. He moved on to chief copywriter at Frank Seaman, Inc. in 1910. In 1919, he joined forces with Clarence Newell to found Newell-Emmett Company. He was vice-president of the company until his retirement in 1928.

Emmett was president of the American Institute of Graphic Arts (AIGA) from 1924 to 1925. As president of AIGA, he initiated a traveling exhibit of prints. He was awarded the AIGA Medal in 1926 for his "service to the graphic arts in America."

In 1928, Emmett retired from advertising to concentrate on collecting rare books and prints. His print collection included woodcuts, prints, engravings, and literary manuscripts. His collection featured rare prints of the masters as well as a mastery in the printing process. His good friend and president of Pynson Printers, Elmer Adler, said of Emmett that he had trained himself on what to acquire and had a responsibility that a collector should be knowledgeable on their collection and continually develop their judgement. He kept a library in Washington Mews, one of his homes, which attracted artists and collectors to share his collection.

From 1929 to 1932, Emmett was a founder and editor of The Colophon, a quarterly journal for book collectors.

Emmett died May 6, 1935.
