= Digital Scriptorium =

Consortium of American libraries

- Curators: Educational consortium
- Funded by: Institute for Museum and Library Services
- Website: digital-scriptorium.org

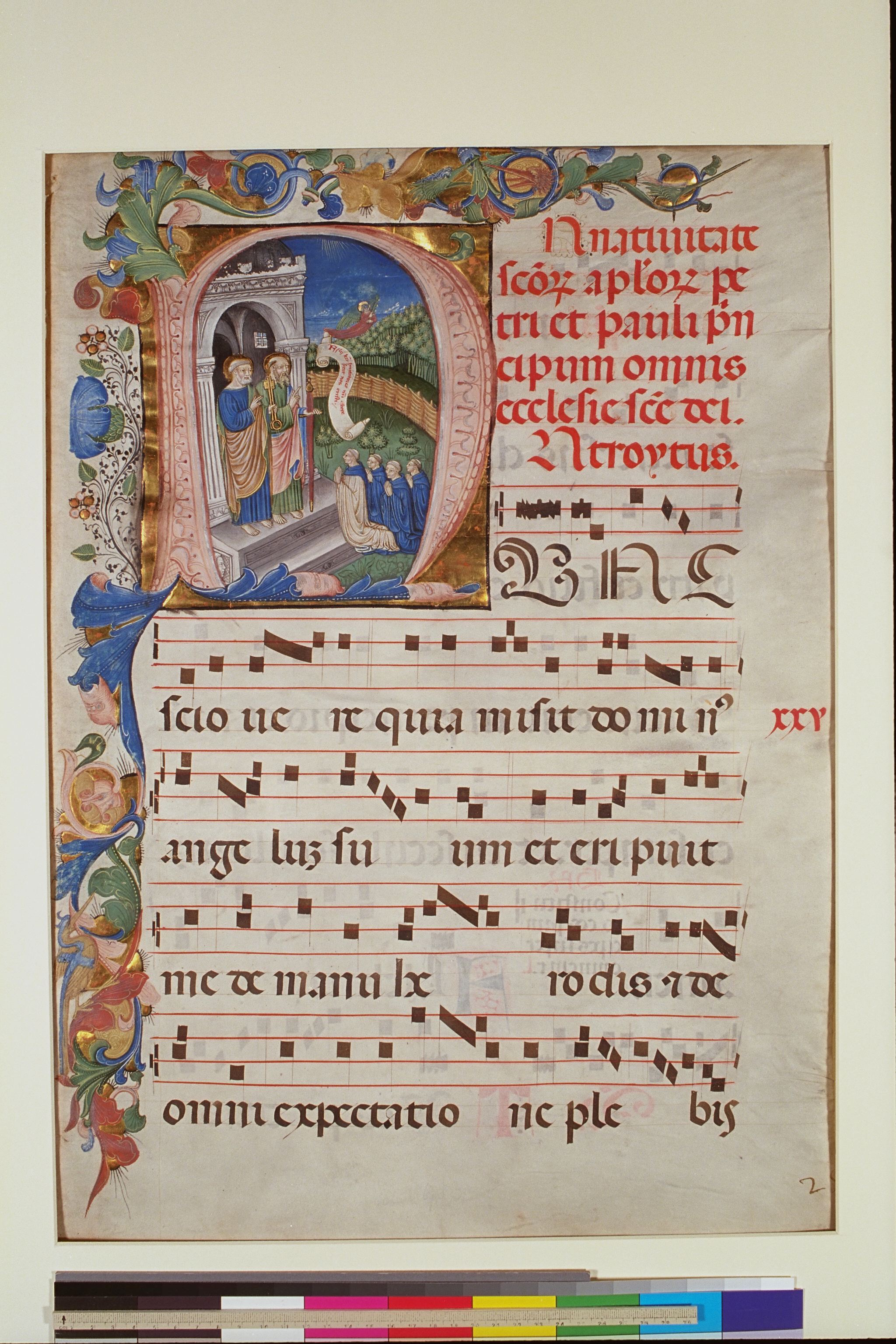
Leaf from a Gradual, c, 1450–1475, Italy; New York, Columbia University, Plimpton MS 040A

Digital Scriptorium (DS) is a non-profit, tax-exempt consortium of American libraries with collections of medieval and early modern manuscripts, that is, handwritten books made in the traditions of the world's scribal cultures. The DS Catalog represents these manuscript collections in a web-based platform form building a national union catalog for teaching and scholarly research in medieval and early modern studies.

The DS Catalog is an open-access resource based on Linked Open Data technologies and practices. It enables users to study manuscripts held in academic, research, and public libraries and museums in the United States. It makes available collections that are often restricted from public access and includes not only famous masterpieces of book illumination but also understudied manuscripts that have been previously overlooked for publication or study.

DS is overseen by a board of directors and is supported by its member institutions. As an organization with national representation, DS serves the interests of a diverse community of scholars, teachers, students, hobbyists, booksellers, and collectors—anyone with an interest in premodern manuscripts. As of 2025, the DS catalog holds over 28,000 records from 46 different collections.

== History ==
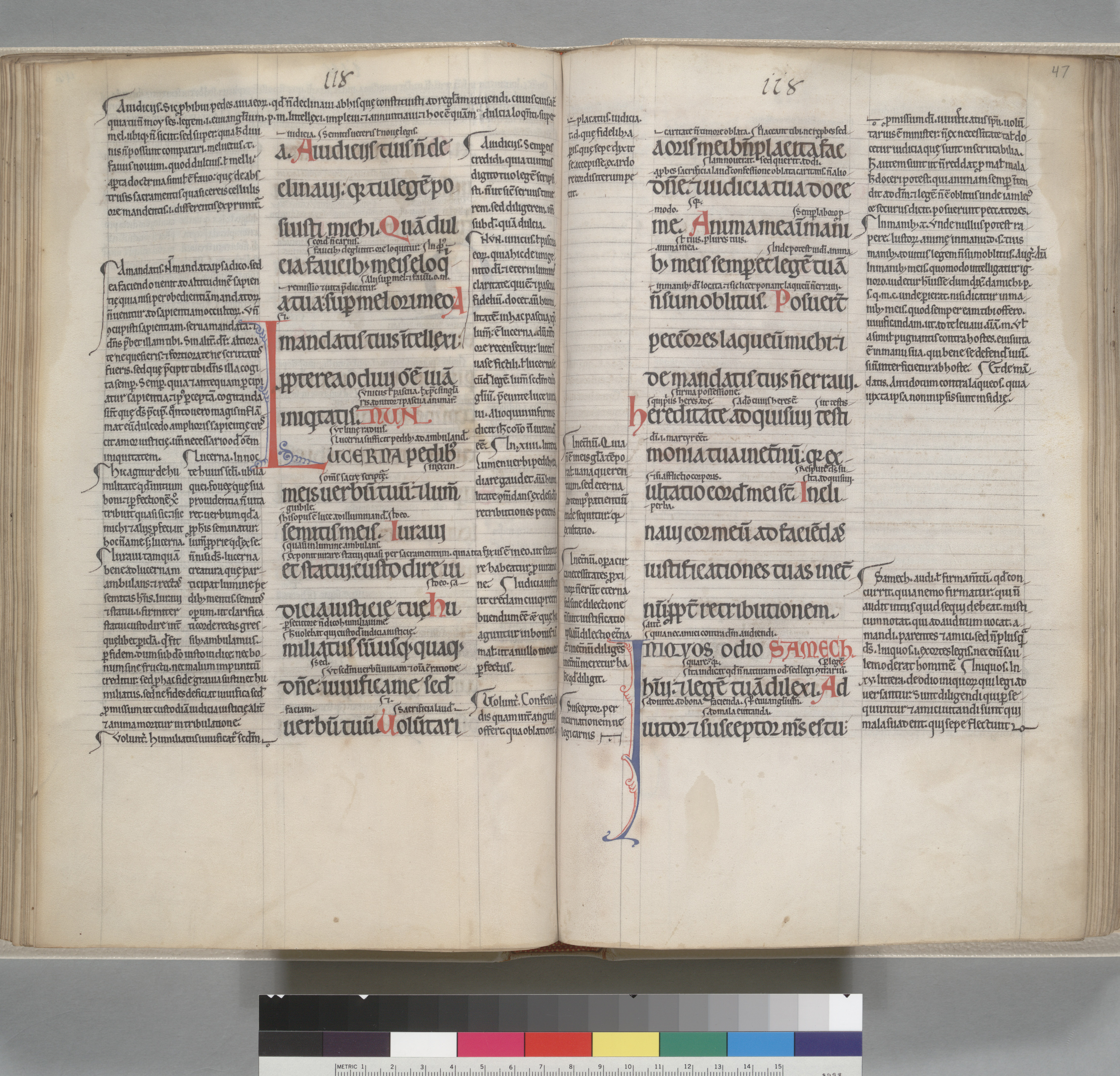
Glossed Psalter, Paris, c. 1140–60; Berkeley, CA, U.C. Berkeley Bancroft Library, MS UCB 147, fol. 46v-47r.

Founded in 1997 and funded by grants from the Andrew W. Mellon Foundation, the National Endowment for the Humanities, the Gladys Krieble Delmas Foundation and the Institute for Museum and Library Services, DS at its inception was a joint project funded by the Andrew W. Mellon Foundation between the Bancroft Library at the University of California, Berkeley (under Prof. Charles Faulhaber) and the Rare Book & Manuscript Library of Columbia University (under Dr. Consuelo W. Dutschke). The original goal was to digitize and make an online database available on the World Wide Web catalog records and selected images from the two universities' medieval European and early Renaissance manuscript collections. By providing free online access to these collections, the founders hoped to inspire more research and study of medieval manuscript culture. Moreover, because of patterns of collecting in the 19th and early 20th century, many manuscripts in American collections comprise partial texts or detached single leaves. Cataloging as many of these fragmentary works as possible increases the chance that some manuscripts could be reconstituted, if only virtually.

Based on this model, DS attracted additional members. Between 1999 and 2005, additional holdings from Huntington Library, the University of Texas, Austin, and the New York Public Library, Harvard University's Houghton Library, Yale University's Beinecke Library, and the University of Pennsylvania. Among these institutions with substantial collections were libraries with few but rare works such as the Providence Public Library, which owns an unusual 15th century Bible (Wetmore Ms 1) in rebus format. By September 2015, the DS database included catalog records for over 8,300 manuscripts and 47,000 digitized images (all manuscript records are now preserved on the Digital Scriptorium site on the Internet Archive.

The University of California, Berkeley provided the first home to the DS database, both in terms of managing the project and devising its initial technology. For an interim period of time (2003–2011) DS was hosted at Columbia University but returned to Berkeley in 2011. The technical innovations produced by the teams of both originating universities created a digital product based on a progressive, standards-based digitization policy. Originally using Microsoft Access to serve as a cross-institutional data collection tool, the DS database used SGML and later XML to aggregate and query the combined information. When the database returned to U.C. Berkeley in 2011, a new platform was developed using software known as WebGenDB. WebGenDB is a non-proprietary, web-based interface for the underlying control database GenDB. However, weaknesses relating to both the technical platform and the workflows for data creation and management were by this time beginning to threaten the sustainability of Digital Scriptorium. High standards for data entry required staffing and expertise that many institutions did not have. Further complicating member participation was that many institutions were developing their own institutional platforms for publishing manuscript metadata and images. For example, in 2005 the University of Pennsylvania Libraries began full digitization and cataloging practices using MARC standards and published the MARC records in its own OPAC (Online Public Access Catalog) as well as on its open-access digital repository Openn. Consequently, Penn Libraries stopped adding records to DS because the work was duplicative and the standards of cataloging in DS and in MARC were incompatible. With the increase in digitization of rare materials, especially of medieval manuscripts, across institutions in the United States and around the world, more institutions began to need DS's image hosting services less and less.

== Digital Scriptorium 2.0 ==
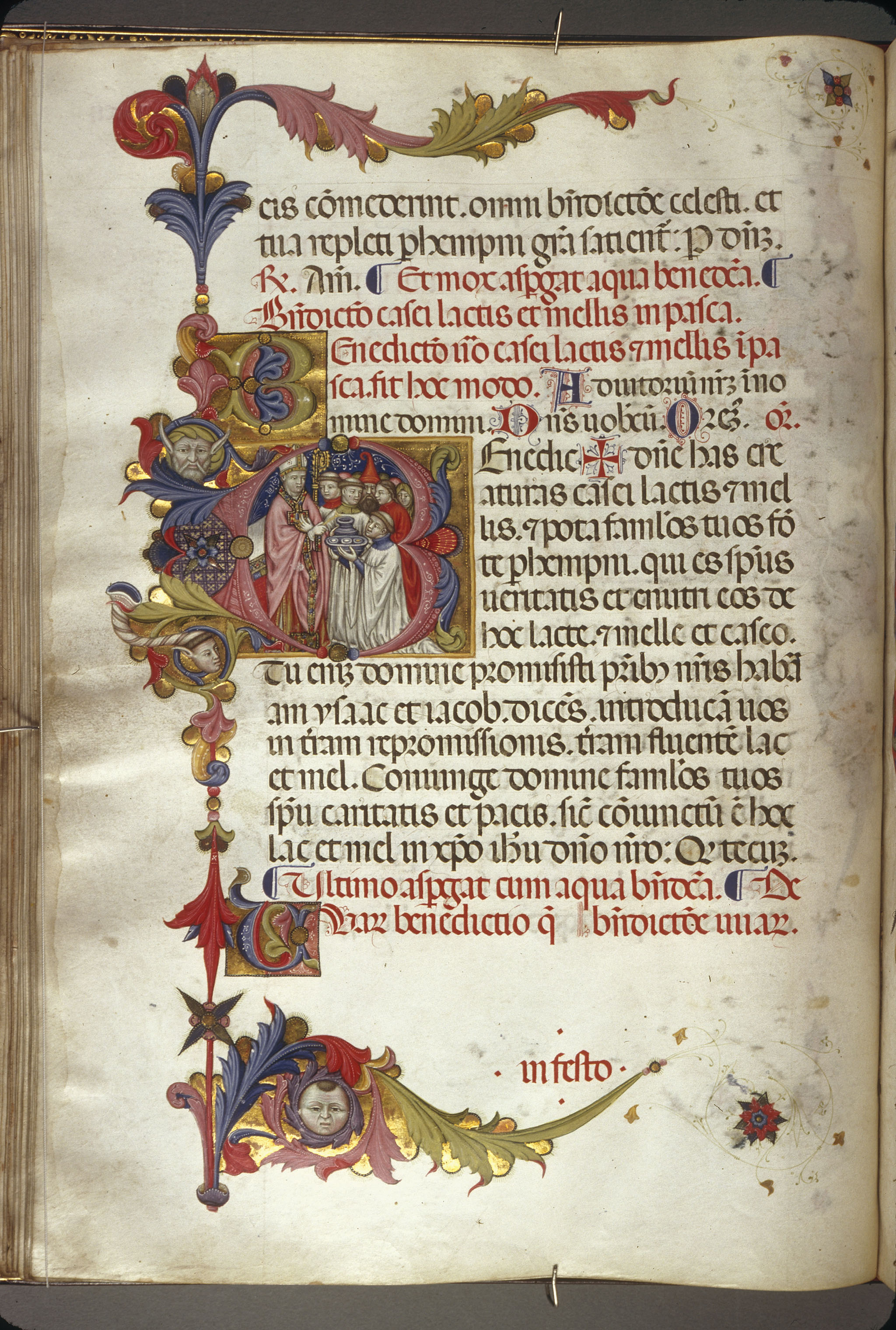
Pontifical, Italy, c. 1385-1499; Cambridge, Massachusetts, Harvard University, Houghton Library MS Typ 0001, fol. 99r

When, in 2018, the UC Berkeley Library determined that it would no longer support the WebGen software that supported the DS database, the DS Board of Directors determined that the DS technical platform required an overhaul. DS took this opportunity to reconsider not only the technical infrastructure but also the workflows and processes of the DS organization in creating and maintaining the platform.

A planning meeting held at the Beinecke Library in February 2019 brought together stakeholders to decide the future of DS. The meeting resulted in the establishment of five guiding principles for development: 1) as a national union catalog, DS 2.0's primary function will be to enable researchers to find premodern manuscripts in US collections, including non-European manuscripts, 2) DS 2.0 will require minimal standards for data entry; 3) members will manage their own manuscript metadata in their institutional formats; 4) DS 2.0 will use what members provide from their institutional record and will not correct or add to a member's metadata; 5) DS 2.0 will not host images, but will provide IIIF functionality to view images in platform; and 6) DS 2.0 will reconcile and enhance metadata with external authorities and in-house Manuscript ID and Name Authorities and will make DS 2.0 data available for reuse.

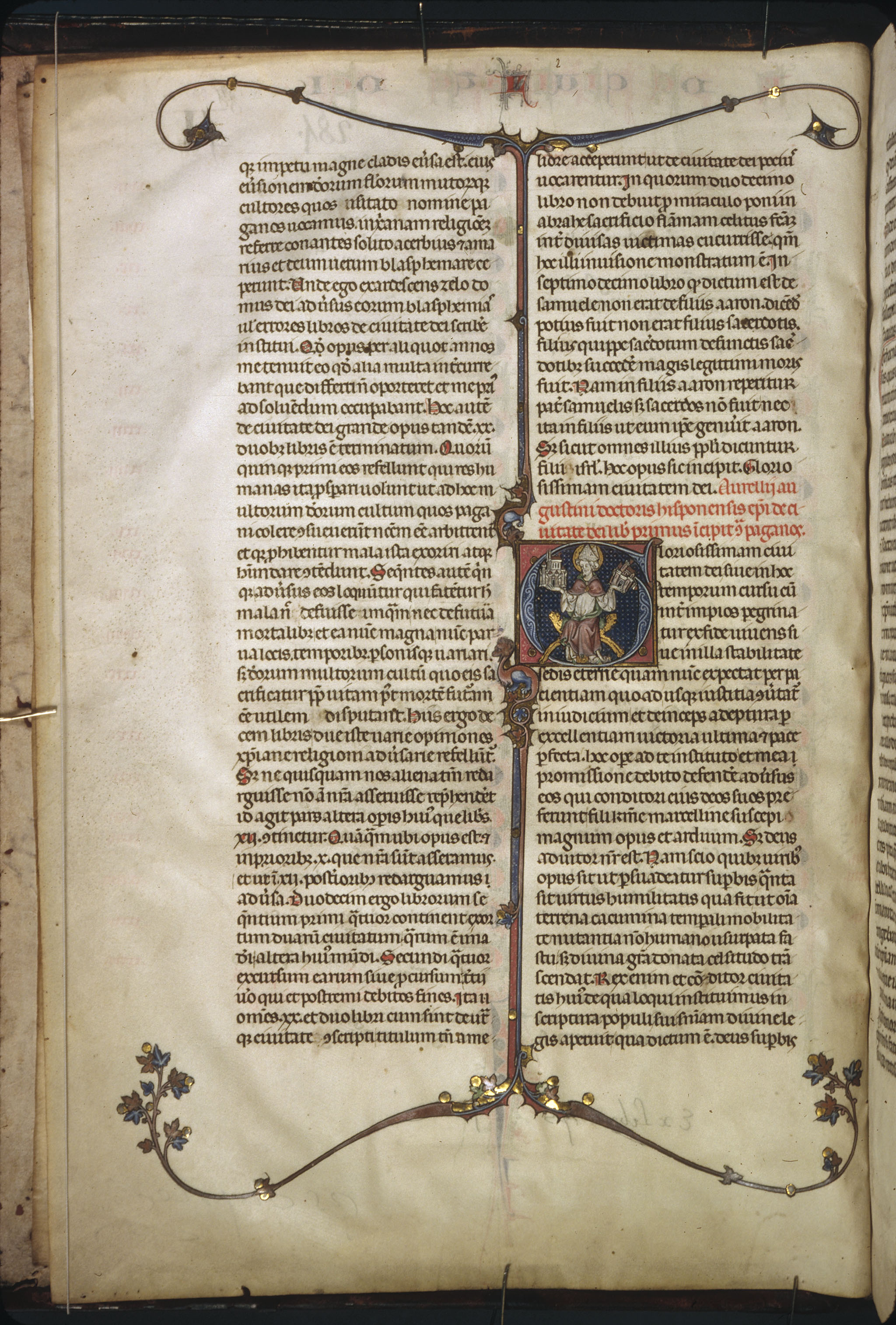
De Civitate Dei, France, c. 1300–1399; Cambridge, Massachusetts, Harvard University, Houghton Library MS Typ 0228, fol. 1v

In 2020, the Schoenberg Institute for Manuscript Studies at the University of Pennsylvania Libraries was awarded, on behalf of DS, a planning grant from the Institute for Museum and Library Services to develop a data model for DS 2.0 and implement a prototype using Wikibase as its technical platform. DS 2.0 solved earlier workflow challenges by transforming data created and maintained by member institutions' structured metadata into LOD and enriches it with semantic connections to external authorities and Wikidata. DS Catalog entries also link out to member institution's websites and digital repositories, where users can discover more detailed information about and often images of the manuscripts held in their respective home collections.

The DS Catalog is an online data repository, a semantic portal, and knowledge base allowing users to explore and query heterogeneous data contained in manuscript records from multiple sources in a single interface powered by LOD. The DS Catalog transforms member institution's structured metadata into LOD and enriches it with semantic connections to external authorities and vocabularies, including the Getty Vocabularies, FAST, and Wikidata. DS Catalog entries also link out to member institution's websites and digital repositories, where users can discover more detailed information about the manuscripts held in their respective home collections.

The beta version of DS 2.0 launched in March 2023 and is known as the DS Catalog.

== Legacy ==
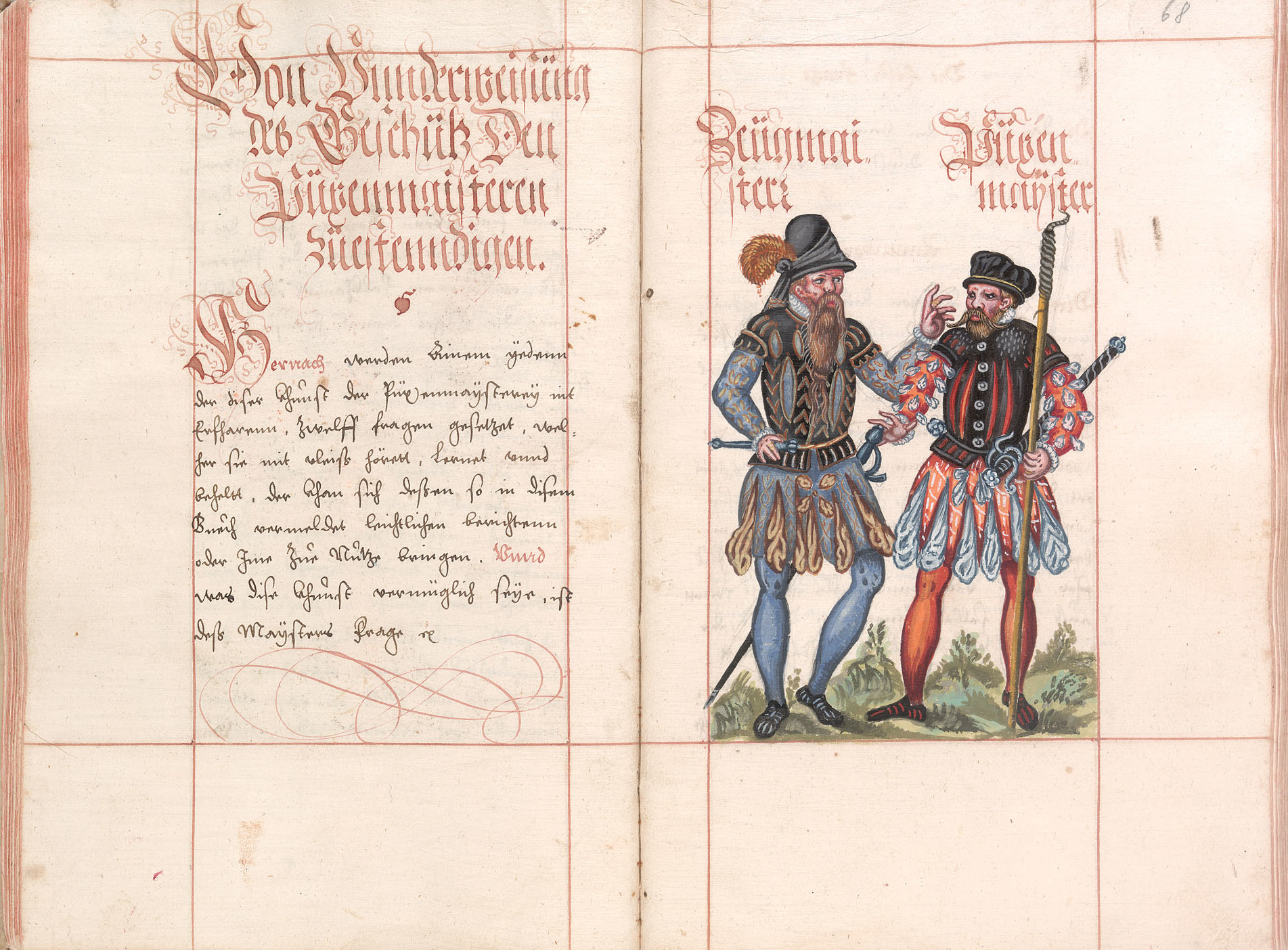
Military use of explosives, Germany, 1584; Philadelphia, University of Pennsylvania, Rare Book and Manuscript Library MS Codex 0109, fol. 67v-68r

Since 1997, Digital Scriptorium has enabled public viewing of non-circulating materials normally available only to specialists with restricted access. Special emphasis has been placed on touchstone materials such as manuscripts signed and dated by scribes, thus beginning the American contribution to the goal established in 1953 by the Comité international de paléographie latine (International Committee of Latin Paleography): to document the relatively small number of codices of certain origin that will serve stylistically to localize and date the vast quantities of unsigned manuscripts[RL1] . DS publishes not only manuscripts of firm attribution but also ones that need the attention of further scholarship that traditionally have gone unnoticed by scholarship. Because it is web-based, it also allows for updates and corrections, and as a matter of form individual records in DS acknowledge contributions from outside scholars. Because the DS consortium consists of academic, public, and rare book libraries and museums, it encourages a broad audience that benefits from a reciprocally beneficial body of knowledge. While attending to the needs of community of specialists, including, medievalists, classicists, musicologists, paleographers, diplomatists, literary scholars and art historians, DS also recognizes a public user community that values rare and unique works of historical, literary and artistic significance.^{[}

== See also ==
- Consortium for European Research Libraries
- Fragmentarium
