= John T. Winterich =

American journalist

John Tracy Winterich (1891–1970) was an American writer and journalist.

Winterich was born in Middletown, Connecticut on May 25, 1891. He grew up in Providence, Rhode Island and graduated from Brown University in 1912.

He was Managing Editor of Stars & Stripes, a prolific contributor of articles to many journals and a prominent American bibliophile in the first half of the twentieth century. He was best known as a contributing editor of the Saturday Review, a position he had held since 1946, after a brief stint as managing editor. While working for Saturday Review he was the original author of "The Criminal Record", a weekly column in which crime and detective fiction was reviewed by Winterich under his pseudonym "Sergeant Cuff", taken from the detective in Wilkie Collins' The Moonstone.

In the 1930s he was editor of The Colophon. He was a contributor to the innovative New York newspaper PM.

== Selected publications ==
- A Primer of Book Collecting. 1927.
- Collector's Choice. 1928.
- Books and the Man. 1929.
- An American Friend of Dickens. 1933.
- Early American Books and Printing. Houghton Mifflin, Boston & New York, 1935.
- Twenty-Three Books. 1938.
- A Primer of Book Collecting. New revised and enlarged edition. New York: Greenberg, 1946. (With David A. Randall)
- Another Day, Another Dollar. 1947.
- Three Lantern Slides. 1949.
- The Grolier Club: 1884-1950, An Informal History. New York: Grolier Club, 1950. A revised edition was published in 1967.
