= Philip C. Duschnes =

American book dealer

Philip C. Duschnes (March 26, 1897 – July 4, 1970) was an American book dealer specializing in rare books. Based in New York City at 66 East 56th Street, then 58th Street and Seventh Avenue, and later 699 Madison Avenue, Philip C. Duschnes Rare Books & First Editions specialized in works by T. E. Lawrence and Mark Twain, as well as fine printing, illuminated manuscripts, and work by the typographer Bruce Rogers. He was also a publisher of The Colophon, A Book Collectors' Quarterly.

Duschnes told a story in 1967 about how for 16 years, he and Joey, his Cocker Spaniel, had walked at night past the bus stop at the corner of 57th and Seventh Avenue. He knew that the last bus to stop there was at 11:24 pm, so whenever he saw people waiting after that time, he'd tell them, in an effort to be helpful, that they'd missed the last bus. In 16 years of doing this, no one had ever thanked him. Then one midnight, the man waiting at the bus stop snapped back: "Is that so, wise guy?" and pointed in the direction of the bus arriving. It was the one night the bus was late. From that point on, Duschnes said, he and Joey "shunned that corner".

When he died three years later, The New York Times reported that his wife, Fanny Duschnes, would continue to run the business.

== Selected works ==
- A Complete Catalogue: Twenty-five Years of Limited Editions Club Books, New York: Philip C. Duschnes, 1954. OCLC 10564860
- Duschnes, Philip C. Two Chapters from an Unfinished Autobiography: It’s Better Than Working; Confessions of a Dealer in Rare Books. Lunenburg, Vt: Printed at the Stinehour Press, 1969.
