= The Colophon, A Book Collectors' Quarterly =

The Colophon, subtitled A Book Collectors' Quarterly or A quarterly for booklovers, was a limited edition quarterly periodical begun late in 1929 and continuing in various guises until 1950. It was the brainchild of Elmer Adler (1884–1962), founder of Pynson Printers of New York City. His idea was that various printers around the world would be willing to contribute their time and expertise to produce signatures (articles) using their own choice of papers, typography and illustration. These articles would then be bound together in boards by Pynson Printers and marketed to 2,000 subscribers.

== Content ==
Some articles comment on a current or historical issue related to printing, publishing or art. Other articles were themselves intended to be an example of printing or a work of art. As each article or item was normally a short section produced by a different designer and printer, a typical issue included a range of styles, papers, and typography, often using unusual or experimental approaches not widely seen in longer or mainstream printed items.

Each issue would also include an original piece of graphic art, some signed by the artist, many produced by using etching, lithography, or engraving. Some of these are rare and valuable; as a result, some copies of the bound volumes have been vandalized to remove the prints.

== Editorial board ==
Adler gathered around him an editorial board of John T. Winterich, Alfred Stanford and F.B. Adams, Jr. and contributing editors including Rockwell Kent, W. A. Dwiggins, Frederic Goudy, Dard Hunter, Bruce Rogers, A. Edward Newton and many others who were well known in the book world. It was their responsibility to provide not only editorial expertise but articles (and in the case of Rockwell Kent, The Colophon logos and colophons).

== Publication history ==
Beginning in early 1930, this "adventure in enthusiasm", as Adler called it, was greeted with public enthusiasm as well, requiring a waiting list for subscriptions. However, it soon ran into difficulty as the Depression made the then costly subscription price of $15 per year difficult for many. By 1935, only 1,700 subscribers could be found. Nonetheless, the quality of The Colophon remained unsurpassed—through the good will of printers, authors and artists—as well as with the help of a number of anonymous financial gifts. From 1935 to 1938, The Colophon entered a new phase with less lofty production values (at a price of $6<Notice given to subscribers which was included in the last two issues of the original 'The Colophon'. per year), before returning to a higher level of quality in 1939 with the 'New Graphic Series'. Starting again in 1948, the name The New Colophon: A Book Collectors' Quarterly was used by Philip Duschnes and the quarterly was entirely printed by the Anthoensen Press of Portland, Maine, continuing publication until 1950 in a fourth and final format.

== Contributors ==
Many of the writers of the day, such as Sherwood Anderson and Edith Wharton, wrote autobiographical articles about their first books and many artists now famous, such as Paul Landacre, Gustave Baumann, Howard Cook, and Emil Ganso, provided original prints.

== Issues ==
Issues of The Colophon and the principal related publications (48 volumes) were:

- Original Series (20): Vol. 1, part 1 (Feb. 1930) - v. 5, part 20 (Mar. 1935), quarto. Parts 1-4 issued to 2,000 subscribers; 5–12, to 3,000 subscribers; 13–16, to 2,500 subscribers; pt. 17–20 to 1,700 subscribers.
- Index, the Colophon, 1930–1935; with a history of the quarterly by John T. Winterich
- New Series (12): Vol. 1, no. 1 (Summer 1935) - v. 3, no. 4 (Autumn 1938), octavo
- The Annual of Bookmaking (1): 1938, quarto
- New Graphic Series (4): Vol. 1, no. 1 (Mar. 1939) - v. 1, no. 4 (Feb. 1940), quarto
- The New Colophon (9): Vol. 1, pt. 1 (Jan. 1948)- v. 3 (1950); v. 1-2 also pts. 1-8 [New York, N.Y. : Duschnes Crawford], quarto
- Index 1936 - 1950; An Index to The Colophon, New Series . . . . by Keller, Dean H. Metuchen: Scarecrow Press, 1968. 139 pp. Boards. Covers the three series of The Colophon published after the conclusion of the original series: New Series, New Graphic Series, and the New Colophon.

== Cover artists ==
Here is a list of the cover artists through 1935:

- Edward A. Wilson Part 1 1930 February
- Joseph Sinel Part 2 1930 May
- Gustave Jensen Part 3 1930 September
- Donald McKay Part 4 1930 December
- W. A. Dwiggins Part 5 1931 March
- T.M Cleland Part 6 1931 June
- Leroy Appleton Part 7 1931 September
- Frank McIntosh Part 8 1931 December
- Edward A. Wilson Part 9 1932 February
- Boris Artzybasheff Part 10 1932 May
- T.M. Cleland Part 11 1932 September
- Ervine A. Metzl Part 12 1932 December
- John Atherton Part 13 1933 February
- Marie Lawson Part 14 1933 June
- Jack Tinker part 15 1933 October
- Louis Bouché Part 16 1934 March
- Carl Noell part 17 1934 June
- Farle A. Drewry Part 18 1934 September
- Kirk C. Wilkinson Part 19 1934 December
- Frederic W. Goudy Part 20 1935 March
