= Fragmentarium =

Digital medieval manuscripts archive

- Website type: Disciplinary repository
- Available in: English
- Founded: January 1, 2015
- Owner: University of Fribourg
- Website: fragmentarium.ms

Fragmentarium (Digital Research Laboratory for Medieval Manuscript Fragments) is an online database to collect and collate fragments of medieval manuscripts making them available to researchers, collectors and historians worldwide. It is an international collaboration of major libraries and collections including the British Library, Bibliothèque nationale de France (BnF), Martin Schøyen Collection, Bavarian State Library, Harvard, Yale and the Vatican. It is based in Switzerland at the Institute for Medieval Studies of the University of Fribourg (Center for Studies in Manuscripts) and the project's current director is Professor Christoph Flüeler from the University of Fribourg and the Virtual Manuscript Library, Switzerland.

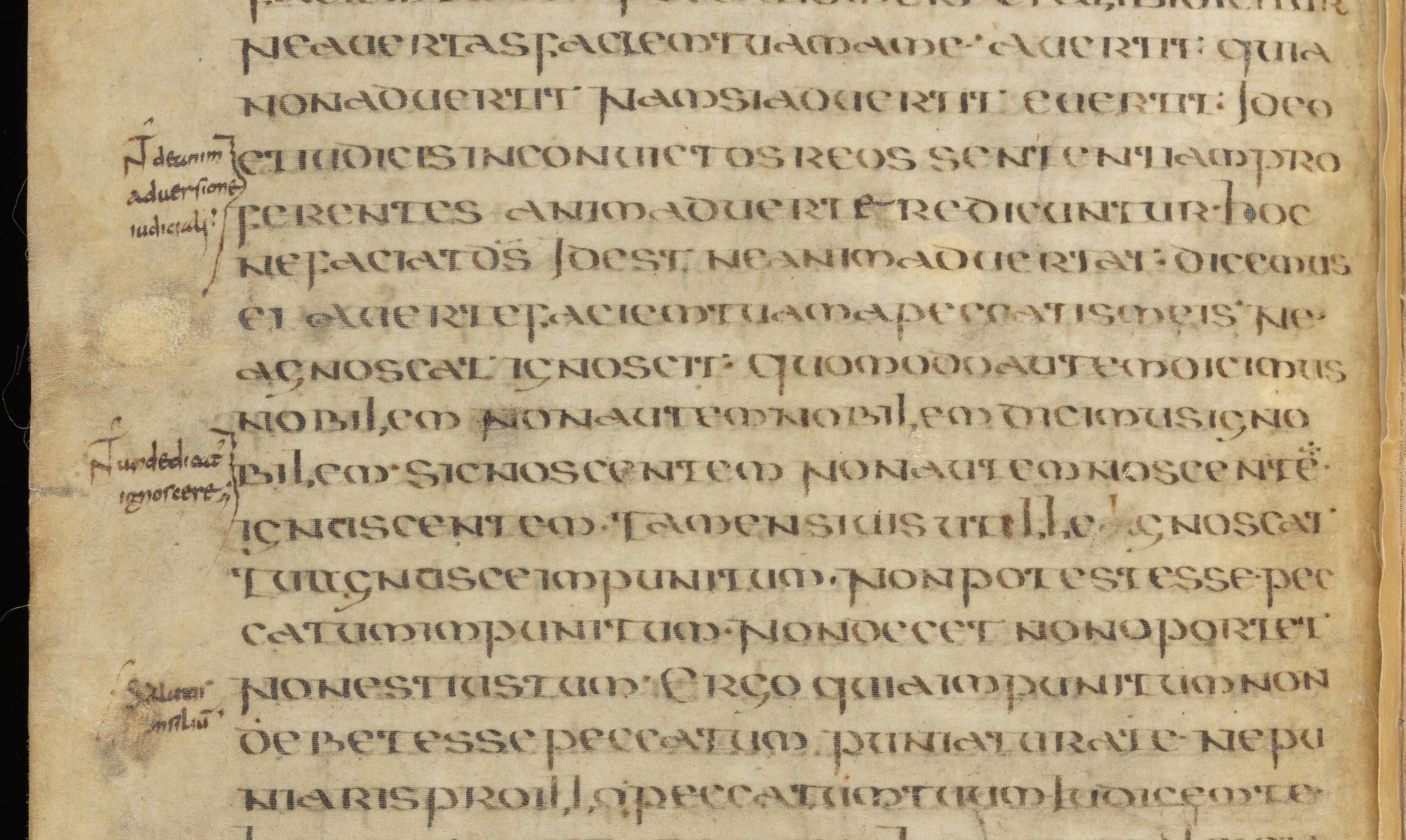
Florus de Lyon fragment, Bibliothèque de Genève, Ms. lat. 16

== History ==
The Fragmentarium project was first proposed in October 2013 and the first planning meeting took place in Cologny in 2014. It was supported initially by representatives of 12 institutions, its goal being to study the field of manuscript fragment research and look at worldwide cataloguing standards. Fragmentarium was officially launched on 1 September 2017, by the Medieval Institute of the University of Fribourg at Abbey Library of St. Gall in St. Gallen, Switzerland. Historians and librarians are now able to upload images to the Fragmentarium where they will be made available for research and encouraged to publish images under a Creative Commons public domain license. The library currently operates as a closed system and will open up public resources gradually from 2018.

== Method ==
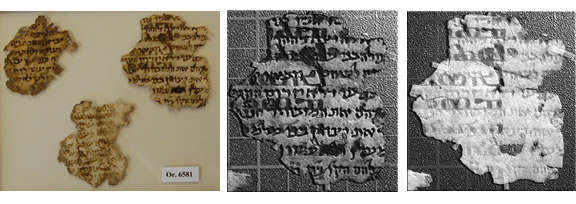
Multispectral image of palimpsest fragments Or. 6581 with infrared (middle) and ultraviolet (right)

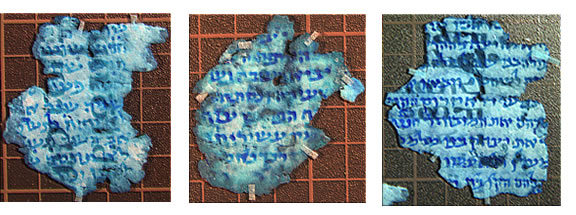
Enhanced multispectral imaging of palimpsest fragments composite images

Fragmentarium follows an established Swiss codex digitisation system known as e-codices and aims to promote cooperative research and discussion between researchers and scholars from multiple institutions. As more fragments are uploaded it will be possible to reunite fragments which have become separated and compare analyses of similar manuscript pieces. Some fragments have been analysed using the Cornell High Energy Synchrotron Source (CHESS) to identify pigments, creating a unique "fingerprint" to enable it to be matched to corresponding fragments elsewhere in the world and potentially track their journey with “the potential to learn more about trade routes, historic mining sites, and the regional use of pigments and ingredients”. Other fragments have been identified as "recycled" into covers or bindings for later documents, a practice which was prevalent in the 15th to 17th century. The system is also useful in documenting and digitally preserving partial manuscripts which have been damaged by neglect or fire as in the Cotton library fire of 1731, or by deliberate destruction as occurred in the reformation in Scandinavia. In more recent times, in the 1950s and 1960s medieval manuscripts were frequently deliberately divided in order to attract a higher return on resale values and have subsequently become lost to researchers: Fragmentarium hopes to reunite them. Flüeler has estimated that around 90% of extant fragments are currently "lost" in archives.

In 2018 Fragmentarium published Fragmentology, described as a journal for the study of medieval manuscript fragments.

Access to the library is free of charge.

== Participants and donors ==
As of 2019 the following institutions are partner participants in Fragmentarium:

- Abbey library of Saint Gall
- Bayerische Staatsbibliothek, Munich
- Biblioteca Apostolica Vaticana
- Bibliothèque nationale de France
- Bodleian Library in association with St Edmund Hall, Oxford University
- The British Library
- Center for History and Palaeography of the National Bank of Greece Cultural Foundation
- Harvard University
- Herzog August Library
- Martin Schøyen Collection, Oslo
- Medieval Academy of America
- Österreichische Nationalbibliothek
- Stanford University Libraries
- Universitätsbibliothek Leipzig
- Università degli Studi di Cassino
- Universitätsbibliothek Leipzig
- University of Pennsylvania Libraries
- Yale University Library

Fragmentarium was financially supported by the Stavros Niarchos Foundation, the Swiss National Science Foundation and the Zeno-Karl-Schindler Foundation.

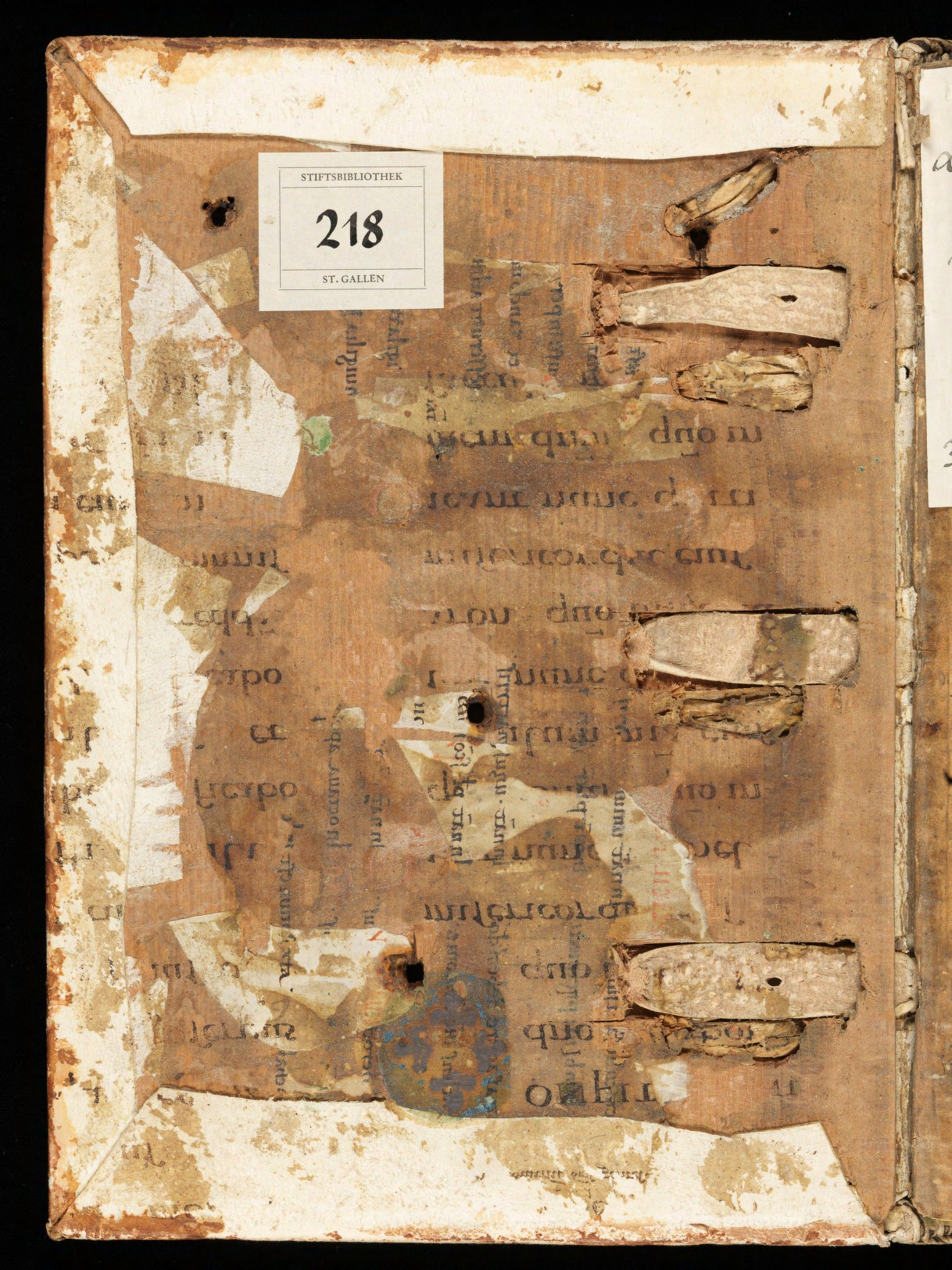
Psalterium Gallicanum medieval manuscript fragment used as book binding

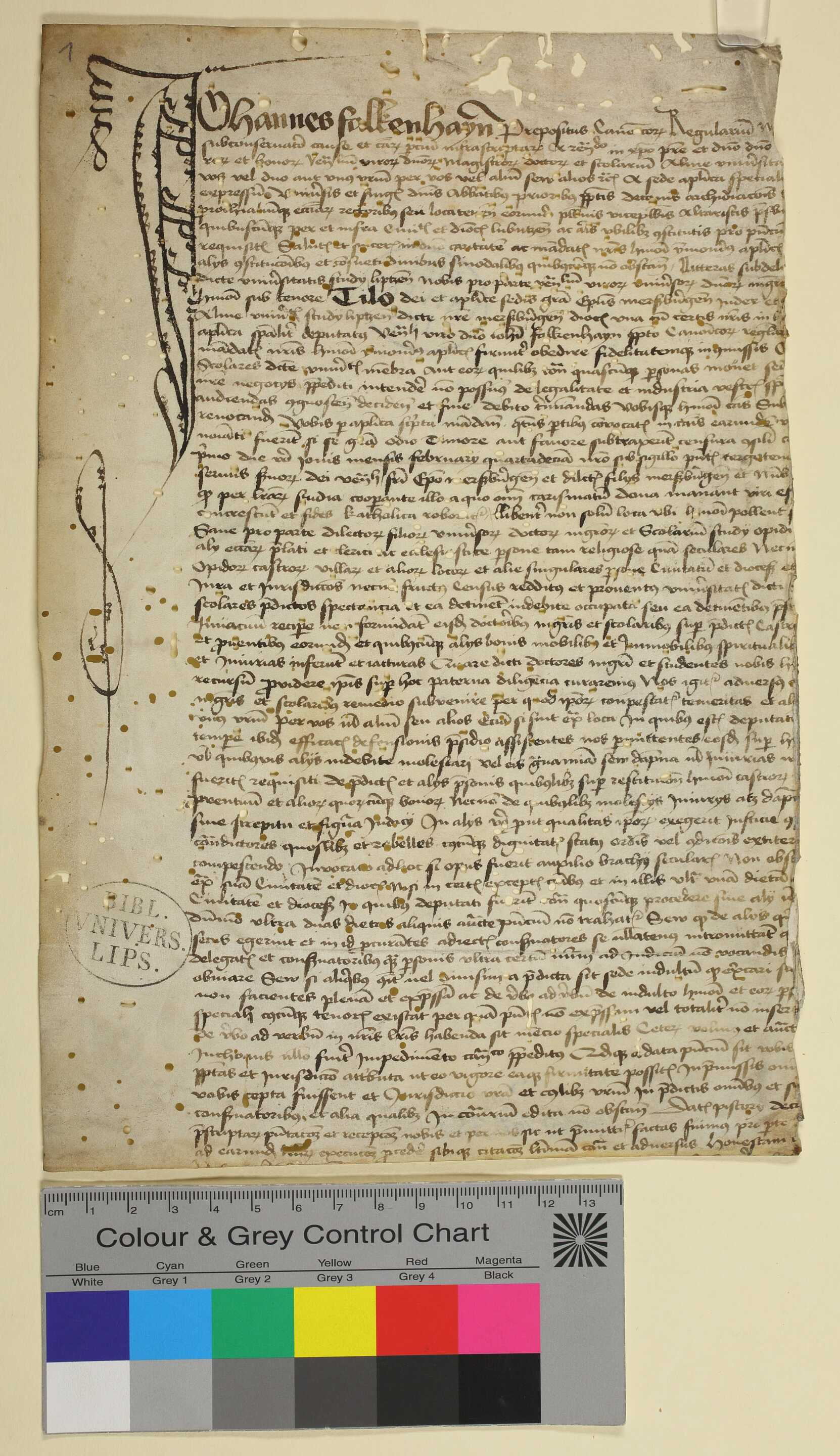
Single leaf parchment fragment dated 1467-1500 CE from Leipzig with annotation by Johannes Falkenhayn

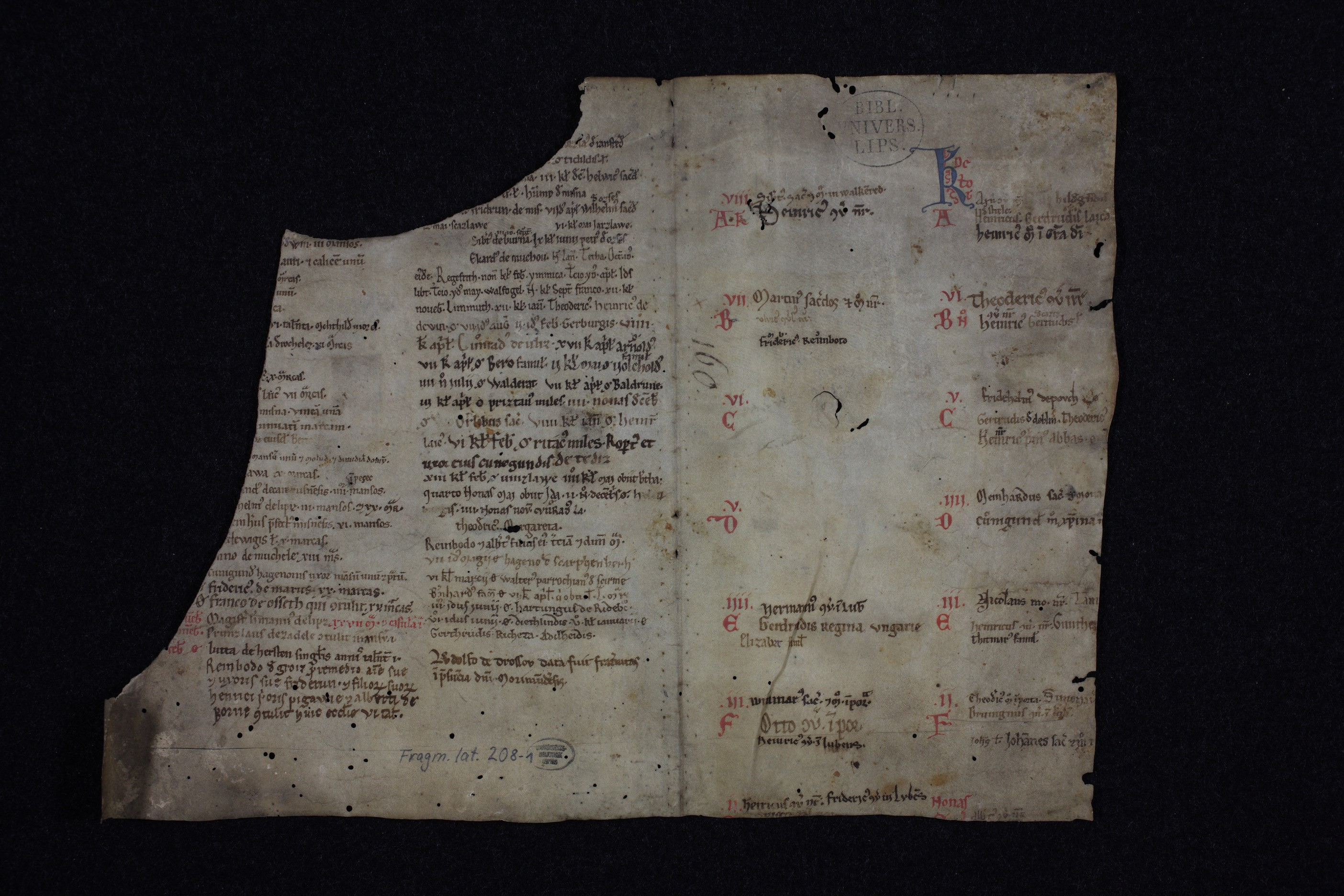
Necrologium monasterii Altzelle reconstructed parchment dated 1186-1250 CE

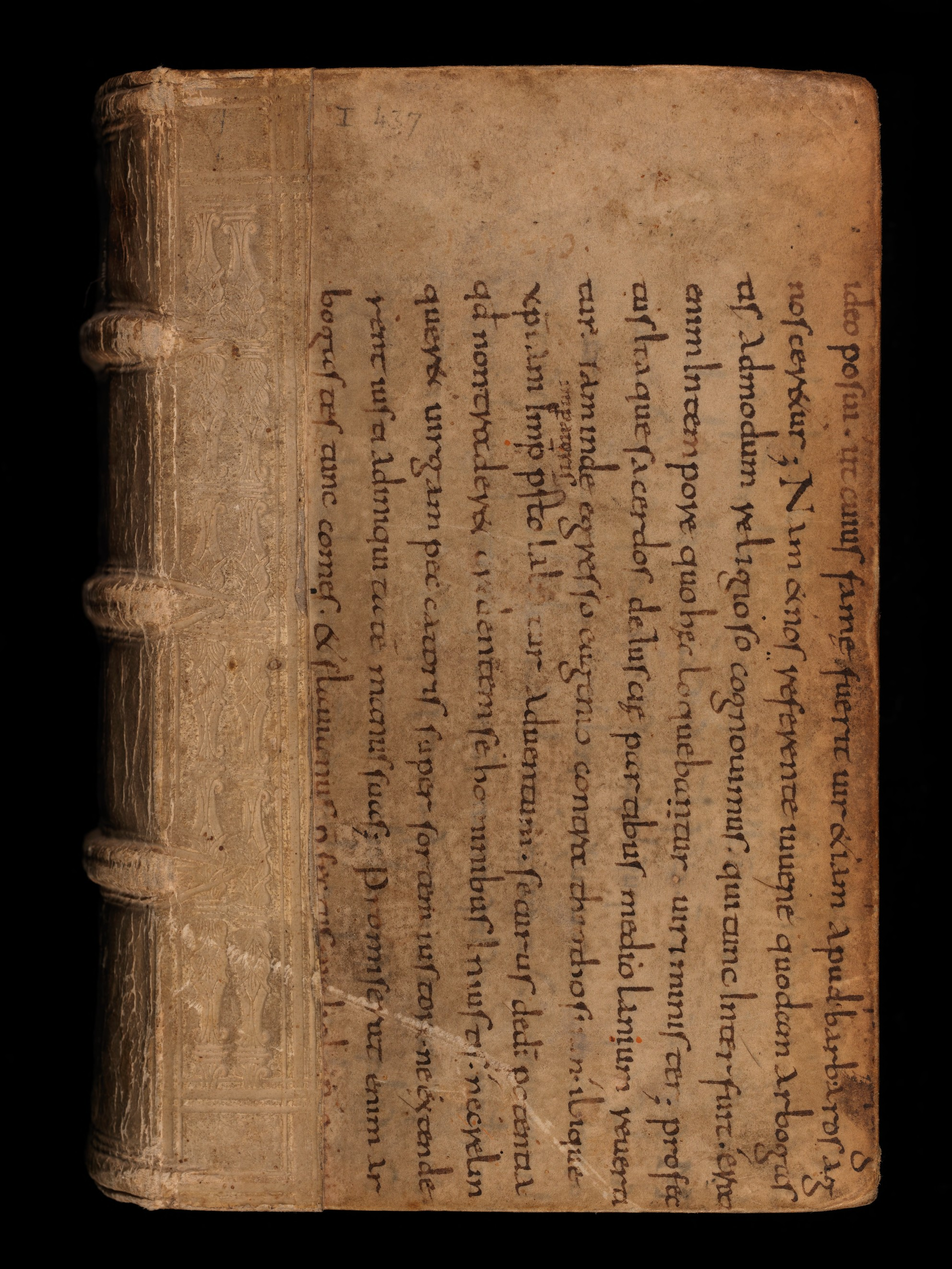
Paulinus Mediolanensis, Vita Ambrosii fragment Le VI 12, Binding A

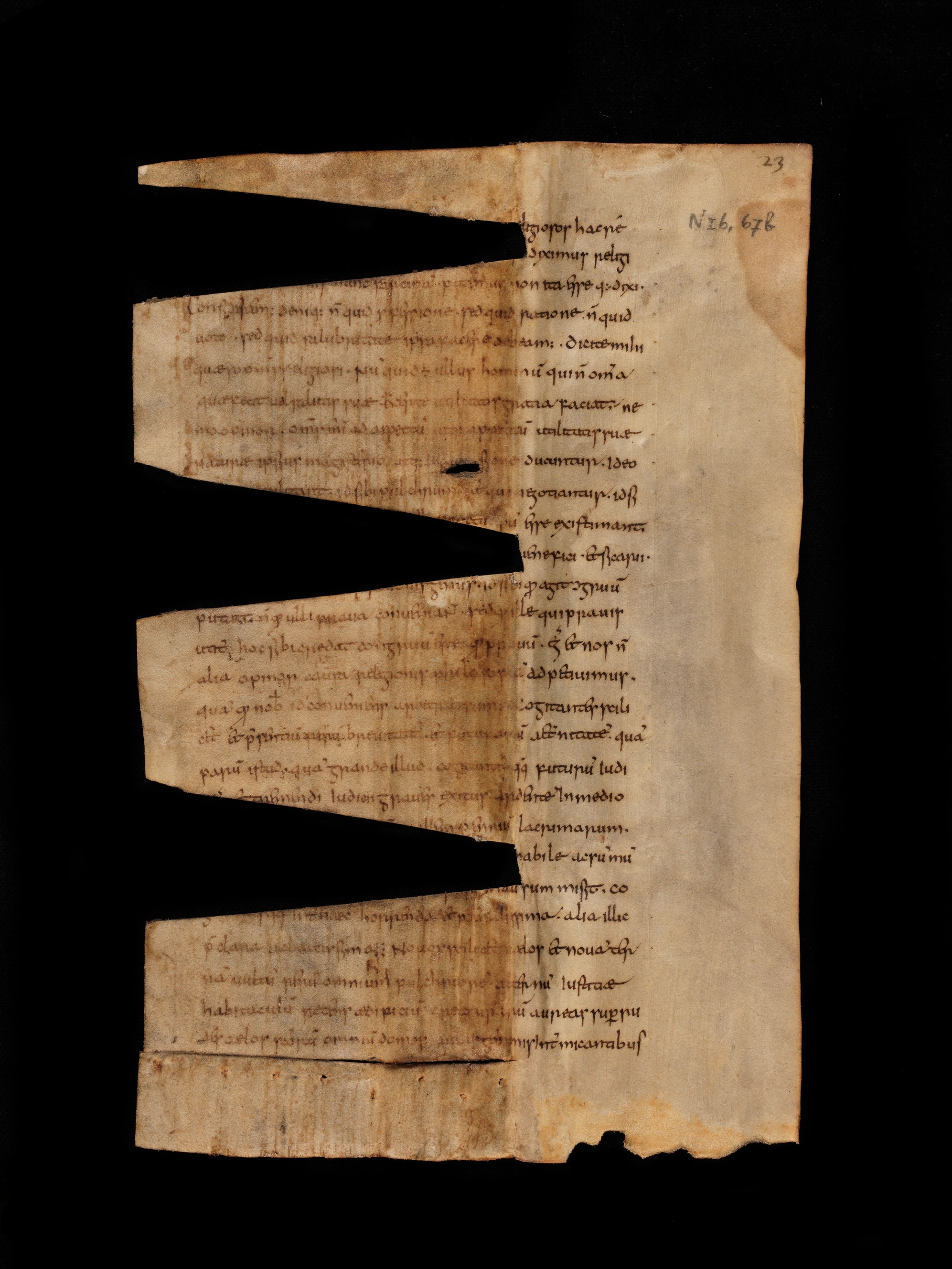
Salvianus, Ad ecclesiam parchment fragment, 2 leaves (trimmed) dated 901-925 CE, Fulda

== See also ==
- Conservation and restoration of illuminated manuscripts
- Digital Scriptorium
