= Otto Ege =

Otto F. Ege (1888–1951) was a teacher, lecturer, bookseller, and well-known book-breaker. He worked for many years at the Cleveland Institute of Art where he served as Chair of the Department of Teacher Training, instructor of Lettering, Layout, and Typography, and Dean. He was also employed by the School of Library Science at Case Western Reserve University as a lecturer on the History of the Book, and instructor of History and Art of the Book.

Otto Ege's greatest fame, however, came as a result of his book-breaking. Over a period of decades in the early 20th century, Ege systematically removed the pages of some 50 illuminated medieval manuscripts, and divided them into 40 unique compilation boxes, commonly referred to as "Otto Ege Portfolios". These portfolios were in turn sold and distributed world wide. Although strong profits were made from each sale, Ege defended his actions by stating, "Surely to allow a thousand people 'to have and to hold' an original manuscript leaf, and to get a thrill and understanding that comes only from actual and frequent contact with these art heritages, is justification enough for the scattering of fragments".

Over the last several years, Peter Stoicheff has been working to locate all existing Ege Portfolios, and to foster co-operation from their respective owners in creating an "Ege Medieval Manuscript Database" with the ultimate goal being the digital reconstruction of the complete books. In 2013, Scott Gwara published a comprehensive handlist of all known manuscripts broken by Ege with an indication of the leaves' current locations in libraries worldwide.

In 2015, Ege's personal collection, including 50 unbroken manuscript books, was acquired by the Beinecke Rare Book & Manuscript Library (part of Yale University Library).

== See also ==
- Digital fragmentology reconstruction of manuscripts
