= Age and health concerns about Donald Trump =

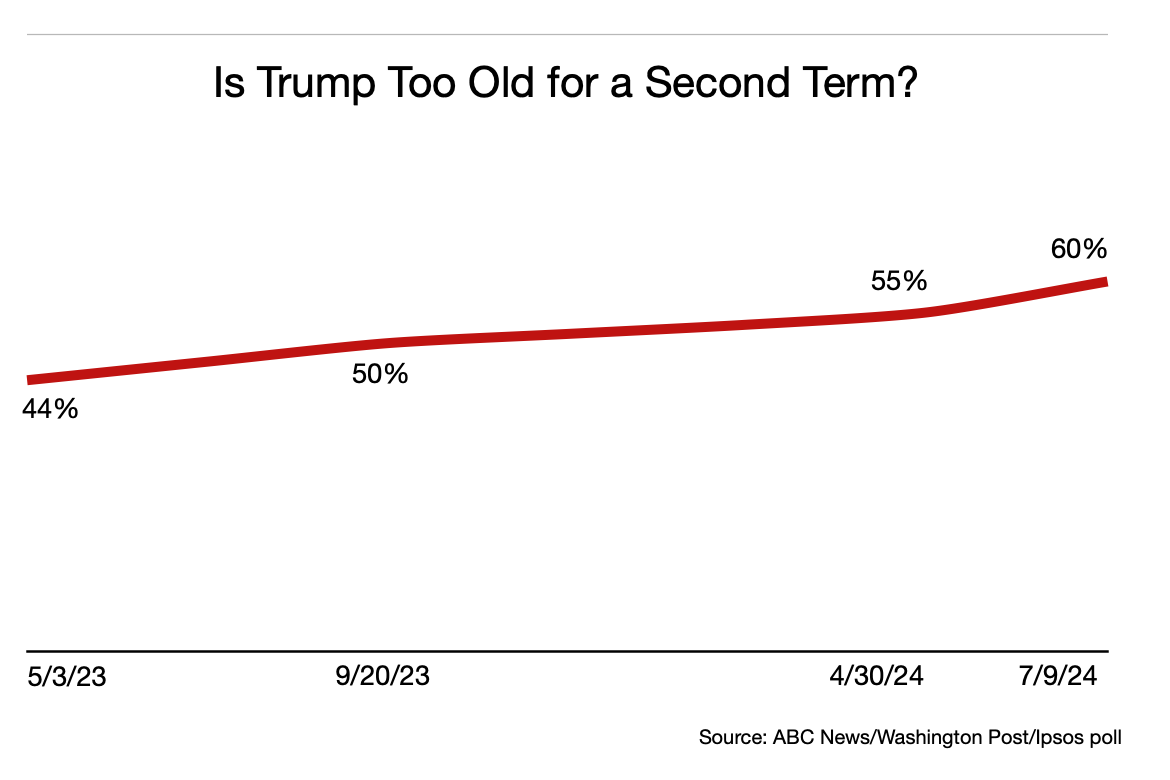
A 2024 poll by Ipsos indicated increased concern about Trump's age and fitness for office between 2023 and 2024.

At 80 years old, Donald Trump, the 45th and 47th president of the United States, became the oldest person in American history to become president upon his second inauguration in 2025. In July 2024, five weeks after his 78th birthday, he became the oldest presidential nominee of a major party. Should he serve as president until at least August 15, 2028, he would be the oldest sitting president in American history. On January 20, 2029, the end of his second term, he would be 82 years, seven months, and six days old.

Since the early days of Trump's 2016 presidential campaign, his physical and mental health have been debated. Trump was 70 years old when he first took office, surpassing Ronald Reagan as the oldest person to assume the presidency. Trump's age, weight, lifestyle, and history of heart disease raised questions about his physical health. Some psychiatrists and reporters have speculated that Trump may have mental health impairments, such as dementia (which his father had), attention deficit hyperactivity disorder or narcissistic personality disorder. Such claims have prompted discussion about the ethics and applicability of the Goldwater rule, which prohibits mental health professionals from publicly diagnosing or discussing the diagnosis of public figures without their consent and direct examination. Public opinion polling from July 2024 indicated an increase in the percentage of Americans concerned about his fitness for a second term.

Trump's 2024 presidential campaign refused to release basic medical records on Trump's health for a significant period, with the most recent release being in 2015. A number of official reports have since been made, concluding that Trump was in "excellent health" and "fully fit" to serve as president. Beginning in 2025, concerns grew over Trump's stamina after he appeared to fall asleep during multiple meetings. By May 2026, multiple polls showed a majority of Americans did not believe Trump was mentally fit to be president. Overall concerns have continued to abound throughout his second presidency, with both Trump insiders and outside critics directly discussing supposed health risks and their future impacts, up to and including a presidential succession by Vice President JD Vance.

== Background and lifestyle ==
Coverage of Trump's mental acuity has generated discussion of whether the media has been "sanewashing" Trump by selecting more coherent clips or quotes from his speeches that give a false impression of mental acuity without balancing that coverage by also focusing on the parts of his speeches that might raise concerns about his mental fitness to be president.

As of 2018, Trump does not drink alcohol; this decision arose in part from watching his older brother Fred Jr. suffer from alcoholism that contributed to his early death in 1981. He also said that he has never smoked cigarettes or consumed drugs, including marijuana.

Trump, in his personal life, subscribes to the fringe and pseudoscientific view of battery theory, positing that a human is born with only a finite amount of energy, which is depleted by physical activity. Trump therefore avoids most types of exercise apart from golf in the belief that this would cause him to die sooner. The concept has been widely debunked by mainstream medical science.

== 2016 presidential campaign (2015–2016) ==
In December 2015, Trump's personal physician, Harold Bornstein, released a letter praising Trump for "extraordinary physical strength and stamina". The letter asserted that Trump would be "the healthiest individual ever elected to the presidency" and said that a recent medical exam yielded "only positive results". Before Bornstein's death in 2021, he told CNN that Trump had dictated the entire letter. The language used was in Trump's style and not typical of a medical doctor; in particular, the American journalist Kurt Eichenwald noted that positive test results do not necessarily mean a favorable outcome for the patient. A follow-up medical report by Bornstein claimed that Trump's blood pressure, liver and thyroid functions were within the normal range, and that he takes a statin. At 6 feet 3 inches (191 centimeters) and 236 pounds (107 kilograms), Trump's body mass index of 29.5 registered on the higher end of overweight BMIs.

During the 2016 Republican Party presidential primaries, presidential candidate and primary opponent Jeb Bush speculated in February 2016 that Trump had mental health issues, stating, "I'm not a psychiatrist or a psychologist, but the guy needs therapy."

== First presidency and 2020 presidential campaign (2017–2020) ==
=== 2017 ===
The "Duty to Warn" movement was founded by medical professionals concerned about Trump's cognitive health in his first year in office.

In 2016 and 2017, a number of psychiatrists and clinical psychologists faced criticism for violating the Goldwater rule; despite having never examined him, they maintained that Donald Trump displayed "an assortment of personality problems, including grandiosity, a lack of empathy, and 'malignant narcissism'", and that he had a "dangerous mental illness".

In 2017, psychologist John Gartner collected more than 41,000 signatures of mental health professionals on a petition, directed to then-Senate Minority Leader Chuck Schumer. The petition asserted that Trump suffered from a serious mental illness and was "psychologically incapable of competently discharging the duties" of the presidency. Gartner asserted that Trump's mental handicaps are a mix of narcissism, paranoia, sociopathy, and sadism.

In February 2017, psychiatrist Allen Frances wrote a letter to the editor of The New York Times regarding Trump and narcissistic personality disorder. Frances said, "I wrote the criteria that define this disorder, and Mr. Trump doesn't meet them." According to the American Psychiatric Association (APA), "saying that a person does not have an illness is also a professional opinion".

On April 14, 2017, Representatives Jamie Raskin and Earl Blumenauer introduced the Oversight Commission on Presidential Capacity Act. The bill, if passed, would have allowed Congress, by a concurrent resolution, to require an 11-member commission to conduct an examination of the president and report the findings.

In April 2017, forensic psychiatrist Bandy X. Lee hosted a meeting at Yale University medical school regarding the ethics of discussing Trump's mental health. In October 2017, Lee published The Dangerous Case of Donald Trump, containing essays from 27 psychologists, psychiatrists, and mental health professionals on the "clear and present danger" that Trump's mental health poses to the "nation and individual well being". They argued that the president's issues affected the mental health of the United States population, and that he placed the country at grave risk of war because of his pathological traits. They asserted that Trump exhibited narcissistic personality disorder, "extreme present hedonism", and bullying. Journalist Carlos Lozada, writing for The Washington Post, considered these conclusions "compelling", but also noted that the book contributors were writing from their own political perspectives and that other mental health professionals held differing views. Lee and others contended that Trump's presidency represented an emergency allowing, or even requiring, psychiatrists to make an exception to the APA's Goldwater rule, which holds that it is unethical for members of the APA to give professional opinions about public figures without having examined them in person and without having obtained their consent. Proponents of such an exception have asserted that there is precedent in allowing psychiatrists to speak out when someone presents a clear and present danger.

General John Kelly, Trump's second chief of staff, purchased a copy of The Dangerous Case of Donald Trump in an attempt to understand the president's "psychoses and consulted it while he was running the White House, which he was known to refer to as 'Crazytown'". Kelly told others that the book was a helpful guide to a president he came to consider a pathological liar, and mentally ill.

In September 2017, Jeanne Suk Gerson wrote in The New Yorker: "A strange consensus does appear to be forming around Trump's mental state", including Democrats and Republicans who doubt Trump's fitness for office.

Also in September 2017, journalist Bill Moyers interviewed psychiatrist Robert Jay Lifton and said that Trump "makes increasingly bizarre statements that are contradicted by irrefutable evidence to the contrary". Lifton replied, "He doesn't have clear contact with reality, though I'm not sure it qualifies as a bona fide delusion." As an example, Lifton said that when Trump falsely claimed that former president Barack Obama was born in Kenya, "he was manipulating that lie as well as undoubtedly believing it in part."

In September 2017, psychiatrist Jeffrey Lieberman published an article commenting on Donald Trump's mental health. He said that, in accordance with the Goldwater rule, no diagnosis should be made of public figures, but also stated that assessing the president's fitness for government should not be left to politicians alone. He arrived at a diagnosis of "incipient dementia", but faced no sanctions from the APA.

=== 2018 ===
In 2018, Trump dismissed then-prevalent questions regarding his mental health, stating that he is a "very stable genius". As evidence of his mental capacities, he pointed to his business success, his victory over Republican competitors, and his election to the presidency against Hillary Clinton. Trump has also disputed claims he could not remember the name of a fallen soldier while talking to the widow, stating he has "one of the great memories of all time".

In January 2018, Trump was examined by White House physician Ronny Jackson, who stated that he was in excellent health, although his weight and cholesterol level were higher than recommended, and that his cardiac assessment revealed no medical issues. Several independent cardiologists commented that Trump's weight, lifestyle, and LDL cholesterol ought to have raised serious concerns about his cardiac health. Trump's 2018 coronary CT calcium scan score indicates he has a form of heart disease called coronary artery disease, which is common for white males at his age.

Donald J. Trump
(@realDonaldTrump)
tweeted:

North Korean Leader Kim Jong Un just stated that the "Nuclear Button is on his desk at all times". Will someone from his depleted and food starved regime please inform him that I too have a Nuclear Button, but it is a much bigger & more powerful one than his, and my Button works!

January 3, 2018

In January 2018, after North Korea's leader Kim Jong Un and Trump publicly exchanged claims about their respective "nuclear buttons", Richard Painter, a former adviser to President George W. Bush, deemed Trump "psychologically unfit" and supported transferring his powers to Vice President Mike Pence under the 25th Amendment. In April 2018, Vanity Fair reported that Trump's advisers "worry about his mental health" when he is outside the controls available in the White House environment.

In response to speculation about his cognitive abilities, Trump voluntarily took the Montreal Cognitive Assessment (MoCA) as part of his January 2018 health checkup. He reported receiving a score of 30/30, indicating a normal level of cognitive function, although the results have not been released. Critics have contended that the MoCA test is too basic to diagnose the problems asserted. Trump used the phrase "person, woman, man, camera, TV" several times during a July 2020 Fox News interview with Marc Siegel, a professor of medicine at New York University, while describing part of the 2018 MoCA test and praising his own performance on it. Trump has not publicly revealed the results of any subsequent cognitive tests but, as late as 2024, continued to praise his performance in the 2018 cognitive test. Ziad Nasreddine, the neurologist who created the test, noted that 2018 results would be too outdated to be relevant in 2024.

=== 2019 ===
An academic consensus across multiple studies was made in 2019, characterizing Trump as having "very high extraversion, very low agreeableness, conscientiousness, and emotional stability, and sky-high narcissism".

In 2019, amid continued speculation, the American Psychiatric Association and Alzheimer's Society requested that professionals other than Trump's doctors adhere to the Goldwater rule and refrain from giving armchair diagnoses of Trump. A growing number of individuals in academia have continued to call for a relaxation of the Goldwater rule.

In February 2019, Trump was examined by White House physician Sean Conley. Conley stated Trump was in "very good health overall", although Trump was now slightly clinically obese, at 243 pounds (110 kg) with a BMI of 30.4.

In a July 4, 2019, speech, Trump said that during the American Revolutionary War, the Continental Army "took over the airports" from the British (airplanes were not invented until 1903, 120 years after the war ended).

=== 2020 ===
Clinical psychologist Mary L. Trump, who is Trump's niece, published a book in 2020 identifying the disorders she believed him to have.

Trump appeared unsteady while walking down a ramp at the United States Air Force Academy on June 15, 2020. He also had difficulty raising a glass of water to his mouth. These episodes raised questions about his health.

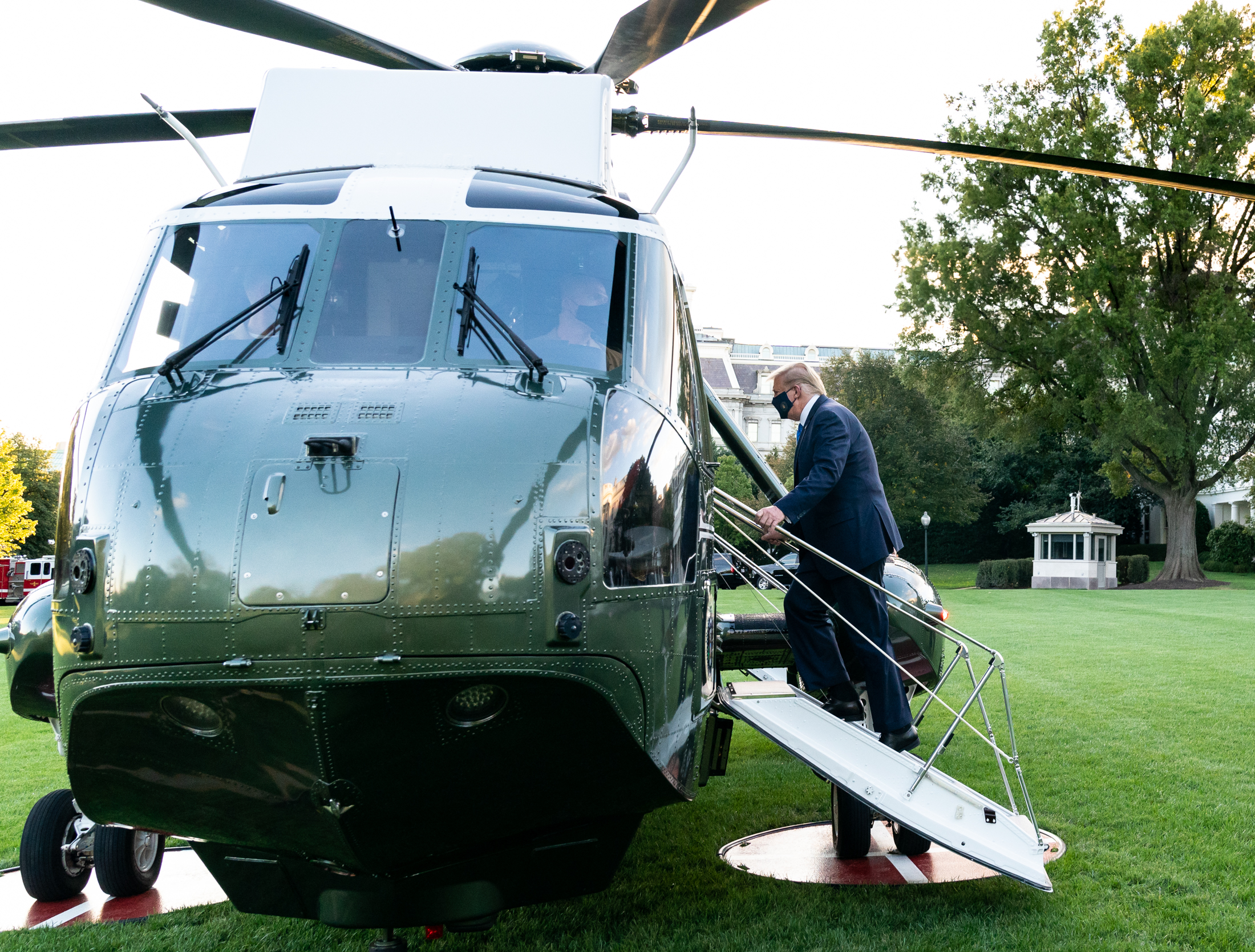
Trump boards Marine One for COVID-19 treatment on October 2, 2020.

On September 26, 2020, an event was held in the White House Rose Garden announcing Amy Coney Barrett's nomination to the Supreme Court following the death of Ruth Bader Ginsburg. According to a 2021 book by Trump's Chief of Staff Mark Meadows, hours after the ceremony, Trump tested positive for COVID-19, although a subsequent test returned negative. Meadows recalled that Trump looked "a little tired" and was suspected of having a "slight cold".

Trump later traveled in Air Force One to a rally at the Harrisburg International Airport in Pennsylvania, which was attended by thousands. After Trump's diagnosis was made public, Pennsylvania health officials advised attendees to participate in the state's contact tracing program.

After returning from Bedminster, Trump received a positive test result on a rapid test and was waiting to get results of a PCR test when he did a live phone interview on Hannity. On October 2, 2020, Trump tweeted that he and his wife Melania Trump had both tested positive for COVID-19, part of a White House outbreak. Later that day, Trump was hospitalized at Walter Reed National Military Medical Center, reportedly due to fever and labored breathing. He was treated with antivirals, an experimental antibody drug (REGN-COV2), and a steroid. He returned to the White House on October 5, still infectious and unwell. In 2021, it was revealed that his condition had been far more serious than he had previously indicated; he had dangerously low blood oxygen levels, a high fever, and lung infiltrates, indicating a severe case of COVID-19.

== Between presidencies and 2024 presidential campaign (2021–2024) ==
=== 2021–2023 ===
In 2022, MSNBC described Trump as "notoriously secretive about sharing his health records with the public" and "deliberately misleading and even dishonest about his health".

In an incident in October 2023, Trump referred to Hungarian prime minister Viktor Orbán as "the leader of Turkey", and said that Orbán shares a border with Russia, which neither Turkey nor Hungary does.

=== 2024 ===
During his 2024 campaign, polls generally showed that a majority of Americans believed that Trump was too old to serve as president. A February 2024 Ipsos poll finding that Joe Biden's age and health were major or moderate concerns for 86% of voters also found that 59% similarly thought Trump was too old to hold the office.

During the course of the 2024 primary campaign, Trump made several gaffes, including confusing Nikki Haley for Nancy Pelosi, claiming he was running against Barack Obama (the Democratic candidate at the time was Joe Biden), and fearing the nation may enter World War II.

A shift in Trump's speeches by 2024 towards shorter sentences, more tangents, more repetition, more all-or-nothing thinking, and more confusion of words and phrases could indicate cognitive decline. Basil Smikle of Columbia University argued in January 2024 that one reason Trump has not seen as much of the age criticism as Biden is that his rallies seem loud and vibrant, whereas Biden has a more old-school approach to politics.

In January 2024, Jay Olshansky gave Donald Trump less than a 75% chance of living through a second term based on publicly available information about his health. Also in January 2024, red spots or sores were spotted on Donald Trump's hands.

On June 14, 2024, Trump said that his longtime acquaintance Joan Rivers had told him that she had voted for him in the 2016 election, although Rivers had died in September 2014.

A few days later, on June 16, 2024, while praising his own performance on a cognitive test administered in 2018, Trump "confused the name of his former White House physician" who had administered the test.

A July 2024 poll, taken shortly after the first presidential debate, found that 60% of voters saw Trump as too old for a second term. This represented a steady and constant increase in voters polled by this pollster sharing this concern, and paralleled the progression of the larger number of voters who had the same concern about Biden.

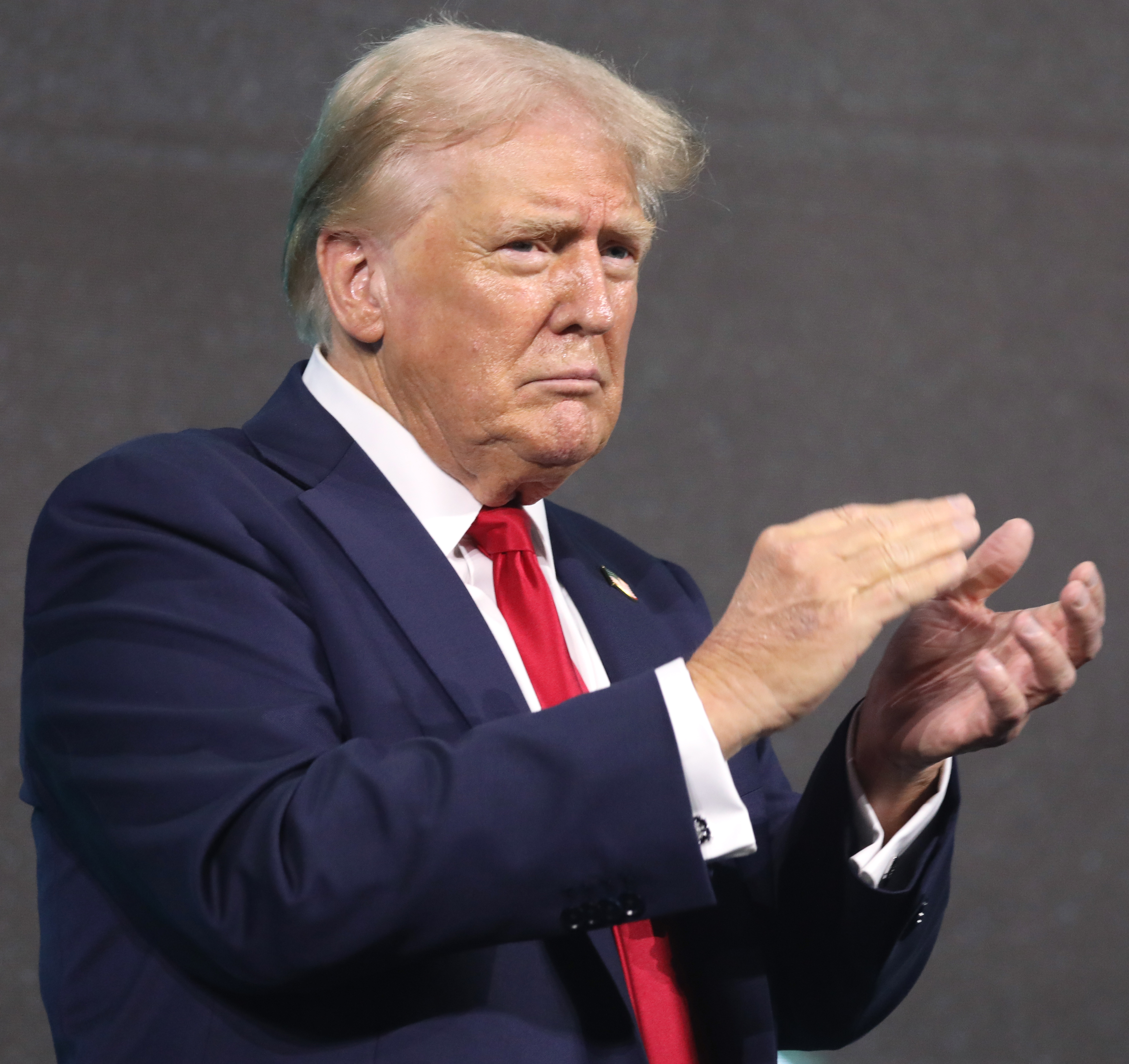
Trump in July 2024

On July 13, 2024, Trump survived an assassination attempt while addressing a campaign rally near Butler, Pennsylvania. Trump was shot at by Thomas Crooks, a 20-year-old man from Bethel Park, Pennsylvania, who fired eight rounds with an AR-15–style rifle from the roof of a building located approximately 400 feet (120 meters) from the stage.

According to the FBI, Trump was hit by a bullet, and injured in his upper right ear. He raised a hand to his ear before dropping down on his podium behind the lectern for cover. Secret Service agents lunged toward Trump and shielded him. After the assailant was declared "down", agents helped Trump get up. Blood was visible on his ear and face. He asked the Secret Service agents to let him get his shoes. According to Trump, the agents "hit me so hard that my shoes fell off, and my shoes are tight." As of October 12, 2024, none of the medical records pertaining to his wounds had been released.

In July 2024, psychologist Simon McCarthy-Jones of Trinity College Dublin said in The Conversation that "the potential effect of the attempted assassination of Trump upon Trump's mental health – whether negligible, negative or positive – cannot be ignored". McCarthy-Jones stated that Trump being an extrovert might improve his ability to deal with the psychological impact of the event. However, he also asserted that "other personality traits, including low agreeableness, low conscientiousness and low emotional stability, also attributed to Trump, are associated with greater levels of PTSD", as are "high levels of narcissism", which can also "cause people to react to even limited threats with aggression". On July 22, 2024, the Washington Post reported interviews with medical experts who believed Trump likely has an elevated genetic risk of dementia. Nephew Fred Trump III said that he sees signs of the dementia that he saw in Trump's father, Fred Trump Sr., who was diagnosed with Alzheimer's disease in October 1991, at the age of 86, eight years before he died.

In August 2024, Gabriel Sherman reported in Vanity Fair suggestions that Trump was in fact "experiencing trauma from his near-death experience"; a campaign insider reportedly claimed that Trump was "watching that seven-second clip of how close he was to getting shot right in the head – over and over and over again".

An August 2024 Morning Consult poll found that the number of respondents who thought Trump was too old to run jumped by seven percent, to 51%, from their previous poll once Trump's opponent changed from Joe Biden to Kamala Harris, and the number of respondents who thought Trump was in good health correspondingly fell by six percent. The poll further reported that nearly 80% of respondents "were unsure he'd be up for serving a full second term". A Marquette University poll released the same day reported that 57% of respondents felt that Trump was too old.

In September 2024, Trump said the audience "went crazy" for him at the presidential debate the preceding week, although the debate had no audience.

On October 6, 2024, The New York Times reported that Trump had maintained a far less active campaign schedule in 2024 than in 2016; the report added that Trump had held only 61 rallies through 2024, compared with 283 in all of 2016. In this same report, they analyzed Trump's speeches, writing, "with the passage of time, the 78-year-old former president's speeches have grown darker, harsher, longer, angrier, less focused, more profane and increasingly fixated on the past, according to a review of his public appearances over the years." The paper commented that Trump has lately seemed "confused, forgetful, incoherent or disconnected from reality" but that it does not get covered much because it is so common. It highlighted an average rally length of 82 minutes compared with 45 minutes in 2016, and a 13% increase in the use of all-or-nothing terms such as "always" and "never". It also found 32% more negative words than positive words compared with 21% in 2016, and a 69% increase in swear words. It cited experts who considered this increase in tangential speech and behavioral disinhibition the potential result of advancing age and cognitive decline.

As of October 12, 2024, Trump had declined to release health information going back to 2015 when he first started running for president, despite a promise he made in August 2024 to release records from a recent examination. Releasing detailed medical reports is typical of presidential candidates.

== Second presidency (2025–present) ==
=== 2025 ===
Between December 2024 and March 2025, bruises were spotted on multiple occasions on Trump's hands, which generated speculation about his health.

On April 13, 2025, three months after Trump's second inauguration, the White House released the results of his physical examination conducted at Walter Reed National Military Medical Center by White House Physician Sean Barbabella. The neurological exam included the Montreal Cognitive Assessment test (MoCA). The report revealed that Trump had at one time had cataract surgery. His reported height was 6 feet 3 inches (191 centimeters) and his weight was 224 pounds (102 kilograms). It mentioned scarring on his right ear from a bullet wound and his "frequent victories in golf events".

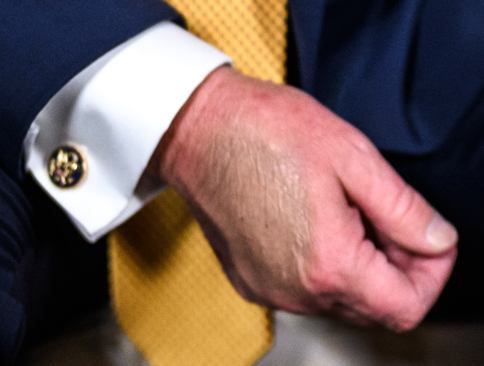
Trump's hand on December 24, 2025

In July 2025, Karoline Leavitt, the White House press secretary, stated that Trump had been diagnosed with chronic venous insufficiency. Trump's physician, Barbabella, wrote in a statement that bruising on Trump's right hand was attributed to his use of aspirin and frequent hand-shaking. It was later noted, however, that vascular tests confirmed that Trump in fact had swelling in his legs at the time of his diagnosis. Large bruises continued to appear on Trump's hands in August through December of 2025 and in 2026.

On August 27, 2025, Vice President JD Vance stated that he was ready to become president; this led to speculation that Trump was seriously ill or dead. That day, he was seen leaving for golf, but a photo which Trump shared of himself on August 31 was determined to have potentially been taken on August 23, fueling further speculation of continuing health concerns. Increased discussion about his mental health occurred in August. A photograph of Trump leaving the White House on September 1 confirmed he was still alive, but led to more speculation about his health due to seeming changes in his appearance. Theories alleging that Trump suffered an ischemic stroke grew following the photos' release; Trump disputed suggestions that he suffered ill health, asserting that he "never felt better in [his] life" in an all-caps Truth Social post. On September 11, during a 9/11 commemoration at the Pentagon, the right side of Trump's face was said to droop down heavily, once again sparking concerns of a stroke.

On taking the Montreal Cognitive Assessment.

We have a great group of people, which they [the Democrats] don't. They have Jasmine Crockett — a low IQ person. They have, uh... AOC is low IQ. You give her an IQ test... have her pass the exams I decided to take when I was at Walter Reed. I took... Those are very hard, uh... They're really aptitude test, I guess, in a certain way, but they're cognitive tests. Let AOC go against Trump. Let Jasmine go against Trump. I don't think Jasmine... The first couple questions are easy — a tiger, an elephant, a giraffe, you know. (Note: The standard MoCA asks the examinee to identify a lion, a rhinoceros, and a camel.) When you get up to five or six, and then when you get up to ten, and twenty, and twenty-five — they couldn't come close to answering any of those questions."

— Trump aboard Air Force One
October 27, 2025

On October 10, Trump had another visit with Walter Reed. Leavitt described the visit as a "routine yearly checkup", despite it being Trump's second at the facility in a six-month-period. Barbabella did not elaborate on the imaging or "preventive assessments" that he performed, but added that Trump's laboratory results were "exceptional," and that his cardiac age is "approximately 14 years younger than his chronological age."

On October 27, Trump told reporters that he had undergone an undisclosed MRI scan during a previous visit to Walter Reed, which, despite his claim that it gave "some of the best reports for the age" and "some of the best reports they've ever seen", led to further speculation about his health due to the undisclosed nature of why he had the procedure done. Trump also bragged about his taking of the MoCA test, again misidentifying the screening assessment for detecting cognitive impairment as a "very hard [...] IQ test" and claiming that younger Democratic political opponents do not have the intelligence to pass it. Whether a third MoCA test was conducted during the October visit or if Trump was referring to his April 2025 and/or January 2018 assessments was not clarified.

On October 28, new concerns about Trump's mental state were raised when a video emerged of him wandering off while walking alongside Sanae Takaichi, the first female prime minister of Japan, while at Akasaka Palace in Tokyo, Japan.

On November 2, Simon Tisdall alleged in The Guardian that "the first signs of the battle over Trump's succession" were now showing, stating that Trump's Vice President J.D. Vance will be "President JD Vance" by the time of the 2028 U.S. presidential election, and describing "President JD Vance or Marco Rubio" as the current frontrunners to run for the Republican nomination in 2028.

On December 2, Trump appeared to fall asleep during a Cabinet meeting, which prompted additional concerns over his health. California representative Sydney Kamlager-Dove speculated in response that Trump was taking Leqembi, used to treat Alzheimer's, stating that his MRI, hand bruises, and apparent drowsiness aligned with the drug's side effects.

=== 2026 ===
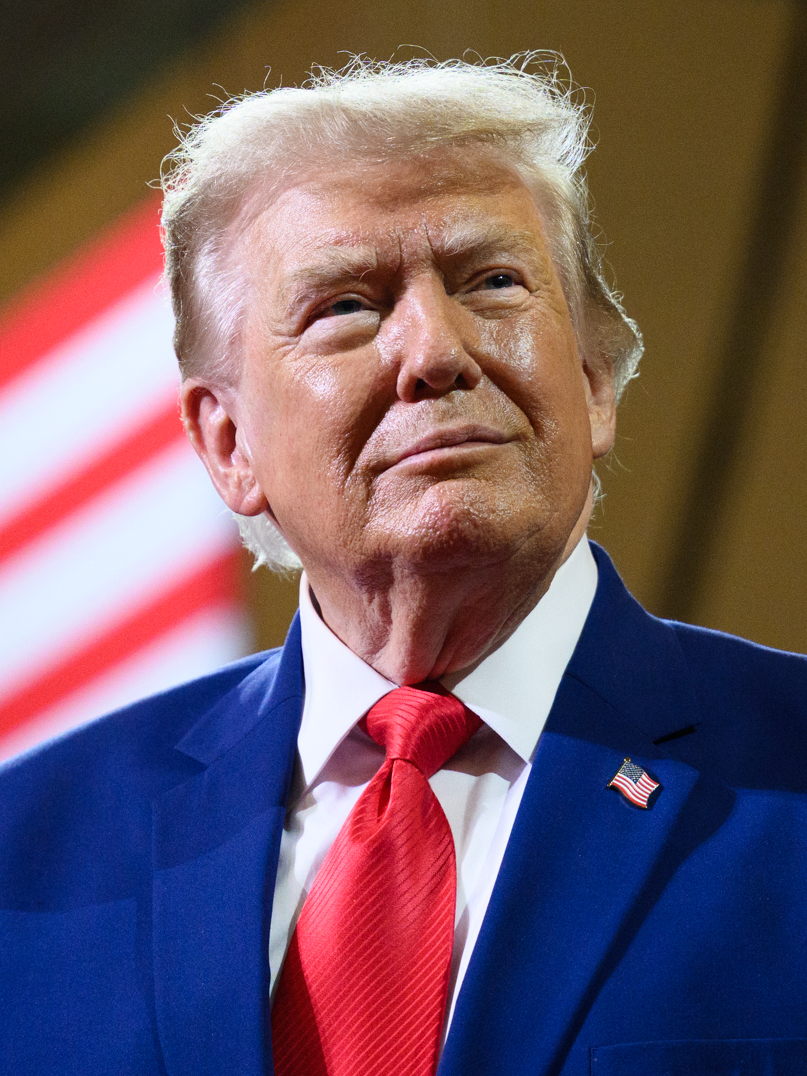
Trump in July 2026

On January 1, 2026, The Daily Beast described Trump as "sick and sleepy," noting his recent history of dozing during public appearances and a recent report revealing how he was requesting to now attend "fewer, more important meetings". Trump would also concede in an interview with The Wall Street Journal that he was now taking a larger dosage of aspirin and ignoring medical advice.

United States Secretary of Health and Human Services Robert F. Kennedy Jr. described Trump's diet as "unhinged" and highly unhealthy in a January interview. Kennedy claimed the president ate high-price premium meals when living at Mar-a-Lago or the White House, but switched to a heavy diet of fast food and candy when travelling. The president apparently had a preference for McDonald's and other major American chains, as he considered corporate restaurants more trustworthy. Kennedy concluded that Trump would need an inhuman constitution to maintain such a lifestyle, stating "I don't know how he's alive, but he is".

The Greenland Crisis has brought particular attention to Trump's fitness and stability regarding his international conduct. Following the publicizing of the "Dear Jonas" letter, in which Trump demanded "complete and total control of Greenland" and cited his perceived snub of the 2025 Nobel Peace Prize as a deciding factor in his escalation of the crisis, Democratic lawmakers widely questioned Trump's mental fitness for office. Senator Andy Kim of New Jersey described it as "unhinged and embarrassing", and Chris Murphy, a member of the Senate Foreign Affairs Committee, as "the ramblings of a man who has lost touch with reality". Vin Gupta, the medical analyst for NBC News, said the letter "crossed a line of proper adult behavior" and should have had a "more thorough public assessment of his neurological fitness," stating that Trump's behavior including his letter to Støre could be signs of early Alzheimer's or frontotemporal dementia.

On January 21, 2026, while speaking in Davos, Trump would at least four times refer to Greenland as "Iceland."

Trump's bruised right hand in October 2026

On January 22, 2026, Trump spoke before world leaders at a summit in Davos, and photographers captured photos of him with a large bruise on his left hand, unlike the bruise on his other hand, which the administration had to address publicly. Trump has publicly attributed the bruising to shaking hands, but he is accustomed to using his right hand, not his left. The bruising and covering of the hand has persisted through October, 2026.

On January 29, 2026, shortly after the signing of Executive Order 14379^{[ws]} "Addressing Addiction through the Great American Recovery Initiative", Trump and his cabinet dismissed news reporters from the Oval Office without an interview. Some social media users, including Rebekah Jones, speculated that the press conference ended abruptly due to Trump defecating himself. These accusations cited an unidentified sound and apparent reactions from Pam Bondi and Doug Burgum's wife Kathryn heard and seen in Forbes's live coverage. In correspondence with Snopes, White House spokesman Steven Cheung denied the rumor that Trump had defecated at the event.

On March 2, Trump was photographed with a dark red rash on his neck. Trump's physician Sean Barbabella issued a statement saying that the president was using a medicated cream as a "preventative" treatment of the skin condition which was expected to last "a few weeks"; he did not explain the skin condition or disclose what the medication was.

On March 12, during a White House gathering for Women's History Month, Trump referred to his current White House Press Secretary Karoline Leavitt as "Kellyanne," appearing to mistake her for the former senior counselor from his first presidency Kellyanne Conway.

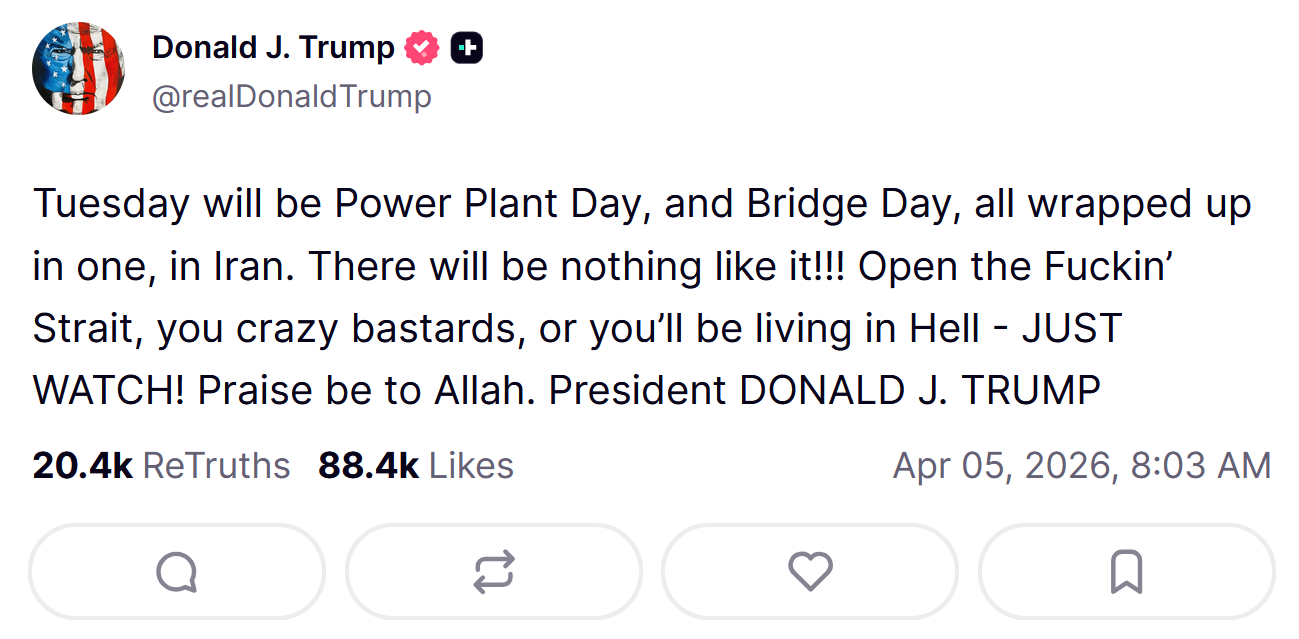
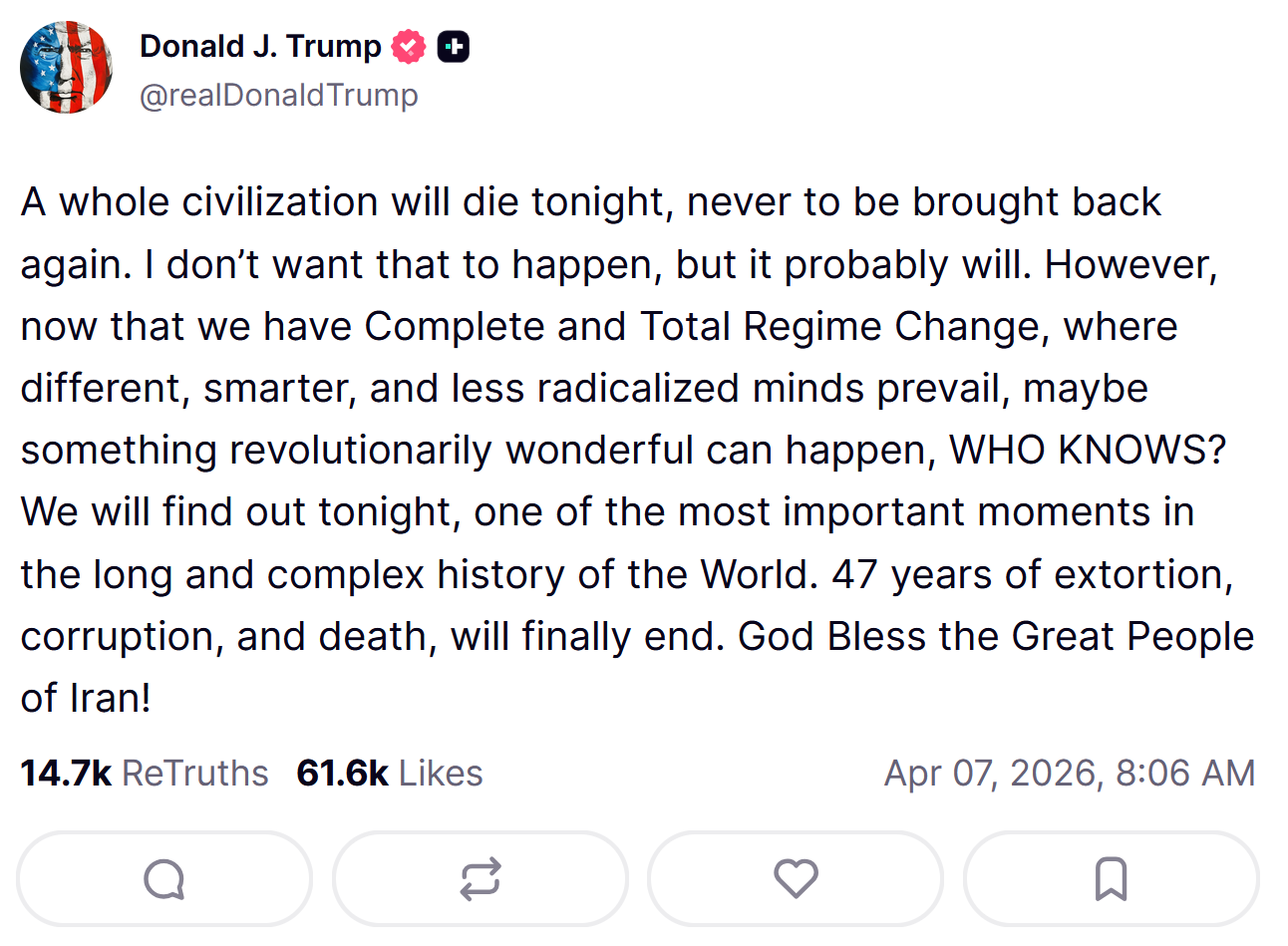
Trump's April 2026 posts sparked concerns over his mental health by both liberal and conservative commentators and politicians, along with international rebuke.

Trump's language became a further subject for concern throughout April. Various lengthy and expletive-laden Truth Social posts, including threats against Iran during the 2026 Iran war and rebukes of Pope Leo XIV, reignited debates over Trump's mental fitness. Self-professed "anti-MAGA" psychiatrist Geoff Grammer stated that "there's a large differential of things that it could be, including him feeling trapped and developing narcissistic rage [...] It could be that he's becoming disinhibited, but it could also be that he is just drifting to who he naturally is." Trauma therapist Shari Botwin speculated that the posts and previous explicit rebukes against allies and opponents were the result of strongly felt insecurities characteristic of narcissism, while Democratic representative Jasmine Crockett characterized Trump as "deranged, likely suffering from dementia" in a letter to vice president JD Vance. Republican representative and Trump opponent Marjorie Taylor Greene joined over 50 Democrats calling for the use of the 25th Amendment, stating that "I think we have to truly question the mental stability of any president that threatens to wipe out an entire civilization" in reference to a post issued on Easter day. On April 14, representative Jamie Raskin wrote the White House physician requesting a comprehensive neuropsychological assessment of the President, noting that "experts have repeatedly warned that the President has been exhibiting signs consistent with dementia and cognitive decline".

On April 17, Ty Cobb, a former member of Trump's legal counsel during his first term in office, claimed that Trump displayed symptoms of dementia, characterizing the linguistic changes displayed in the Truth Social posts as "suggestive of the absence of any frontal lobe controls." Cobb additionally highlighted the late-night timestamps of the posts and Trump's apparent dozing off at Cabinet meetings as aligning with sleep cycle reversals seen in Alzheimer's disease, claiming that the combination of these behavioral traits characterized an acceleration in cognitive decline. White House spokesman David Ingle responded to both Crockett and Cobb's comments by praising Trump's "sharpness, unmatched energy, and historic accessibility" while accusing Crockett of aiding in an alleged cover-up of Joe Biden's mental decline as president and characterizing Cobb as "[a] severe case of Trump Derangement Syndrome." NATO official Paul Fritch also contested the mental illness characterization, speculating that Trump's behavior was instead the result of frustration towards his inability to bring the Iran war to a quick resolution.

On June 2, journalist Aaron Rupar tweeted that Trump had made no public appearances since May 27 when he had attended a Cabinet meeting with a pre-recorded interview being released during that time, in response many commentors questioned the apparent pattern of Trump disappearing from public commitments for about a week each month. Adding to the speculation, it was revealed that Trump had made an hours-long visit to Walter Reed National Military Medical Center, his third visit within a year, where doctors administered what Trump says was his fourth Montreal Cognitive Assessment test.

White House spokesperson Davis Ingle refuted concerns about Trump's health, stating the president had completed multiple engagements with open press slots for the end of the week, and labeled the concerns as "left-wing conspiracies". When questioned about his opinion of the president receiving four medical checkups since the beginning of his second term, Mehmet Oz told reporters that Trump was in perfect health and kept returning for checkups as he likes the results and aces the tests every visit.

On June 3, during a House Foreign Affairs Committee Representative Ted Lieu (D-CA) questioned Secretary of State Marco Rubio over Trump's apparent sleeping in multiple public appearances such as Cabinet meetings. Rubio refuted the idea that Trump was sleeping, claiming that instead Trump does not sleep, and when presented with a video of Trump, appearing to sleep next to Rubio speaking about the Iran war Rubio doubled down claiming that Trump was not sleeping. Lieu expressed concern about how foreign leaders perceive Trump and the United States, and presented a foreign news segment video in which they mocked Trump "fighting sleep" during a Memorial Day ceremony. Trump also appeared to fall asleep at Game 3 of the 2026 NBA finals at Madison Square Garden.

On June 14, Trump became the second president to turn 80 years old while in office, after his second-term predecessor Joe Biden in November 2022.

== See also ==
- Illness and death claims regarding other public figures:
  - Age and health concerns about Joe Biden
  - Claims of Vladimir Putin's incapacity and death
- Make America Healthy Again
- Term limits in the United States
