= PEP =

PEP may refer to:

== Computing and telecommunications ==
- Packetized Ensemble Protocol, used by Telebit modems
- Pairwise error probability, in digital communications
- Peak envelope power of a transmitter
- pretty Easy privacy (pEp), encryption project
- Python Enhancement Proposal, for the Python programming language
- Packet Exchange Protocol in Xerox Network Systems
- Performance-enhancing proxy, mechanisms to improve end-to-end TCP performance
- Policy Enforcement Point, in XACML

== Organizations ==
- Political and Economic Planning, a British think tank formed in 1931
- Priority Enforcement Program, in US immigration enforcement
- Progressive Empowerment Party, political party in Trinidad
- Promoting Enduring Peace, a UN organization
- Pacific Equity Partners, a private equity investment firm
- Propellants, Explosives, Pyrotechnics, a journal
- Provincial Emergency Program (British Columbia), the former name of Ministry of Emergency Management and Climate Readiness

== Natural science ==
- Polyestradiol phosphate, an estrogen used to treat prostate cancer
- Polymorphic eruption of pregnancy or pruritic urticarial papules and plaques of pregnancy
- Post-exposure prophylaxis, preventive medical treatment
- post-ERCP pancreatitis, a complication after endoscopic retrograde cholangiopancreatography
- Phosphoenolpyruvic acid, a biochemical compound
- Pep reaction, proton–electron–proton reaction

== Economics and finance ==
- Nasdaq symbol for PepsiCo
- Personal equity plan, a former UK account type
- Politically exposed person, a financial classification

== Other uses ==
- Passaporte Electrónico Português, Portuguese electronic passport
- PEP (album), a studio album by musician Lights
- PEP (website), a website operated by Summit Media
- Positron-Electron Projects at Stanford Linear Accelerator Center
- Post – eCommerce – Parcel, Divisions of Deutsche Post
- Primary Entry Point, a station of the US Emergency Alert System
- Primate Equilibrium Platform, used in animal experimentation
- Progressive except Palestine, a pro-Palestinian political phrase
- Psychoanalytic Electronic Publishing, academic publisher of psychoanalysis
- Prototype Electro-Pneumatic family of trains, British Rail Classes 445 and 446
- Pulsed energy projectile, a non-lethal weapon

== See also ==
- Pep (disambiguation)
