= The Dangerous Case of Donald Trump =

2017 book edited by Bandy X. Lee

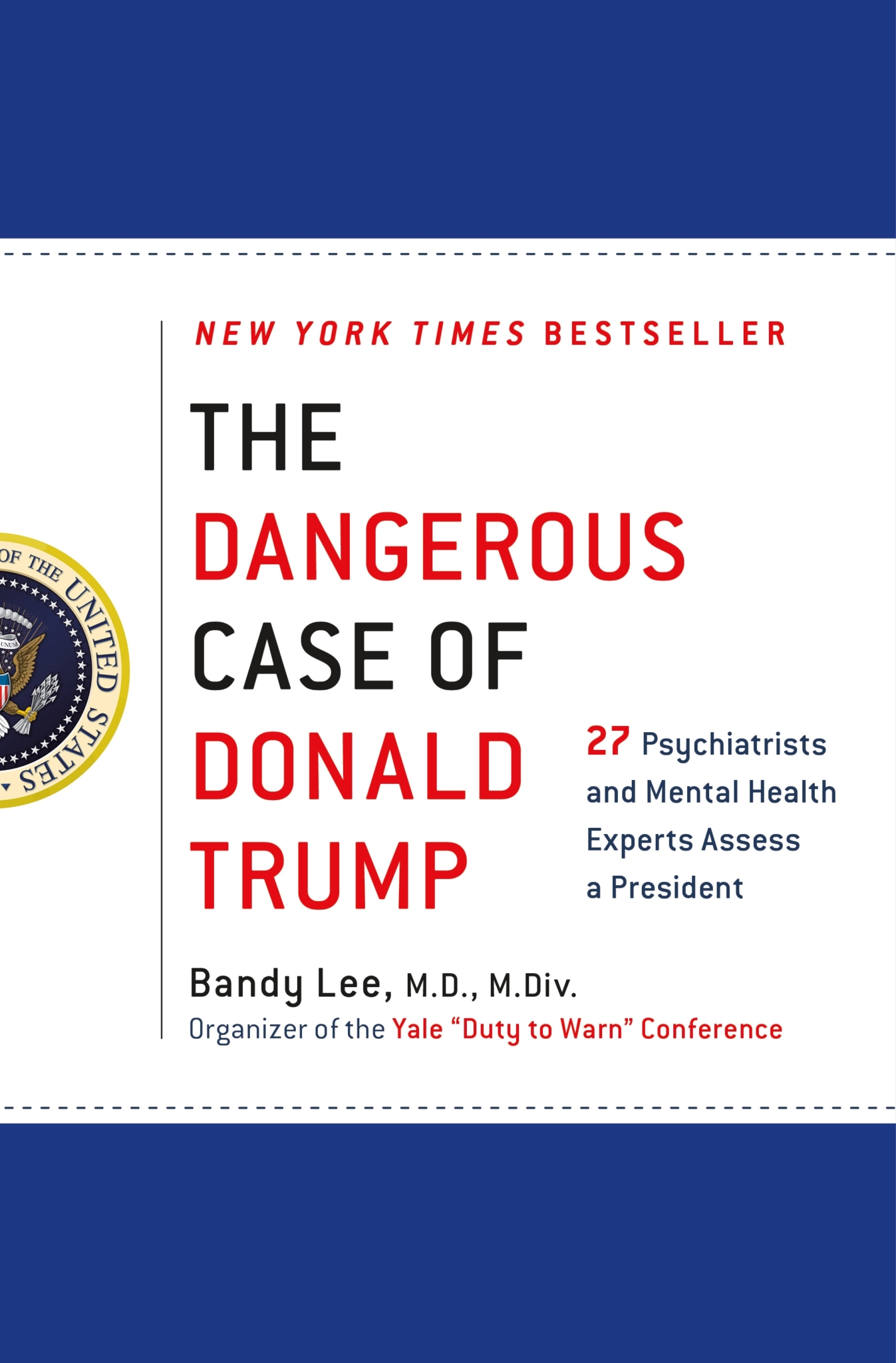
- First edition cover
- Editor: Bandy Lee
- Language: English
- Subject: Donald Trump, mental health, politics
- Genre: Non-fiction
- Publisher: Thomas Dunne Books
- Publication date: October 3, 2017
- Publication place: United States
- Pages: 320
- ISBN: 978-1-250-17945-6

The Dangerous Case of Donald Trump is a 2017 book edited by Bandy X. Lee, a forensic psychiatrist, containing essays by 27 psychiatrists, psychologists, and other mental health professionals describing the "clear and present danger" that US President Donald Trump's mental health poses to the "nation and individual well being". A second edition updated and expanded the book with additional essays. Lee maintains that the book remains strictly a public service, and all royalties were donated to the public good to remove any conflict of interest.

== Synopsis ==
The authors argue that Trump's mental health affects the mental health of the people of the United States and that he places the country at grave risk of involving it in a war and of undermining democracy itself due to his dangerous pathology.

Consequently, the authors claim that Trump's presidency represents an emergency that not only allows but requires psychiatrists in the United States to raise alarms. While it has been repeatedly claimed that they have broken the American Psychiatric Association's Goldwater rule—according to which it is unethical for psychiatrists to give professional opinions about public figures without examining them in person—the authors maintain that pointing out danger and calling for an evaluation is not diagnosis. They have criticized the APA for changing professional norms and standards, saying it is dangerous to turn reasonable ethical guidelines into a gag rule under political pressure.

== Reception ==
Estelle Freedman, the Robinson Professor in U.S. History at Stanford University, said of the book:

This insightful collection is grounded in historical consciousness of the ways professionals have responded to fascist leaders and unstable politicians in the past. It is a valuable primary source documenting the critical turning point when American psychiatry reassessed the ethics of restraining commentary on the mental health of public officials in light of the "duty to warn" of imminent danger. Medical and legal experts thoughtfully assess diagnoses of Trump's behavior and astutely explore how to scrutinize political candidates, address client fears, and assess the 'Trump Effect' on our social fabric.

Reviewing the book for The Wall Street Journal, Barton Swaim wrote, "That the authors differ in their diagnoses does not give one great confidence in the field of psychiatry or, indeed, in the book’s value" and called the essay authors "paranoid".

According to Jeannie Suk Gersen in The New Yorker, "A strange consensus does appear to be forming around Trump's mental state", including Democrats and Republicans who doubted Trump's fitness for office.

In a blog post republished on Salon in September 2017, journalist Bill Moyers wrote, "There will not be a book published this fall more urgent, important, or controversial than The Dangerous Case of Donald Trump". In an interview with Robert Jay Lifton, Moyers said that Trump "makes increasingly bizarre statements that are contradicted by irrefutable evidence to the contrary." Lifton said, "He doesn't have clear contact with reality, though I'm not sure it qualifies as a bona fide delusion." As an example, Lifton said, when Trump falsely claimed that former president Barack Obama was born in Kenya, "he was manipulating that lie as well as undoubtedly believing it in part."

Carlos Lozada in The Washington Post wrote that many politicians and commentators called Trump "crazy" or doubted his mental health. In this book, mental health professionals examine that claim. They conclude, "anyone as mentally unstable as Mr. Trump simply should not be entrusted with the life-and-death powers of the presidency." Lozada wrote that these conclusions are "compelling" but presidents with mental illness, like depression, can be effective, and presidents without mental illness can still be dangerous. Lozada later called the book the "most daring" book he read in 2017.

In September 2022, The Divider: Trump in the White House, 2017–2021, by journalists Peter Baker and Susan Glasser of The New York Times and The New Yorker respectively, reported that John F. Kelly had secretly purchased the book when he was Trump's chief of staff from July 2017 to January 2019. According to the authors, who interviewed Kelly for the book, he considered the book helpful in dealing with Trump, whom he considered insecure, egotistical, and a pathological liar.

== Contributors ==
- Noam Chomsky
- Howard H. Covitz
- Lance Dodes
- William J. Doherty
- Edwin B. Fisher
- Henry J. Friedman
- John D. Gartner
- Nanette Gartrell and Dee Mosbacher
- James Gilligan
- Leonard L. Glass
- James A. Herb
- Judith Lewis Herman
- Diane Jhueck
- Luba Kessler
- Bandy X. Lee
- Robert Jay Lifton
- Craig Malkin
- Elizabeth Mika
- Jennifer Contarino Panning
- David M. Reiss
- Tony Schwartz (writer)
- Gail Sheehy
- Thomas Singer
- Michael J. Tansey
- Betty P. Teng
- Harper West
- Steve Wruble
- Philip Zimbardo and Rosemary Sword

== See also ==
- Bush on the Couch
- Mental health of Donald Trump
- Unhinged
- A Very Stable Genius
