= Lance Dodes =

American psychiatrist and psychoanalyst

Lance M. Dodes is an American psychiatrist and psychoanalyst best known for his theory that addictions are psychological compulsions.

== Biography ==
Dodes received an A.B. from Dartmouth College in 1966, his D.M.S. from Dartmouth's Geisel School of Medicine in 1968, and his M.D. from Harvard Medical School in 1970. He is a training and supervising analyst emeritus of the Boston Psychoanalytic Society and Institute, and a retired assistant clinical professor of psychiatry at Harvard Medical School.

== Work on addiction ==
Prior to Dodes' work, psychological theories about addiction separated them from other common psychological symptoms. Dodes was first to characterize addictions as identical to the symptoms of compulsions, a view that allows for understanding and treating addictions the same way as other compulsive symptoms. In his book The Heart of Addiction and peer-reviewed academic articles, Dodes argued that addiction is a symptom that reflects a need to reverse overwhelming feelings of helplessness. His second book, Breaking Addiction: A 7-Step Handbook for Ending Any Addiction was honored as a Library Journal Best Book in its category.

In The Sober Truth: Debunking the Bad Science Behind 12-Step Programs and the Rehab Industry, Dodes and his co-author reviewed 50 years of research and said that most people who have experienced Alcoholics Anonymous (AA) have not achieved long-term sobriety, and only five to eight percent of the people who go to one or more AA meetings achieve sobriety for longer than one year. The book was featured in a NPR segment and a New York Times review. The 5–8% figure put forward by Dodes is controversial.

== Other works ==
In 2004 Dodes appeared in an episode of Penn & Teller: Bullshit! In 2015 he appeared as an expert in the film "The Business of Recovery". He contributed an essay to the 2017 book The Dangerous Case of Donald Trump, and had an opinion letter expressing concerns about Trump's emotional stability published by The New York Times.

== Honors ==
In 2001, Dodes was honored by the Division on Addictions at Harvard Medical School for “Distinguished Contribution” to the study and treatment of addictive behavior.

In 2009, Dodes was elected a Distinguished Fellow of the American Academy of Addiction Psychiatry.

Dodes was awarded an Author Prize by Psychoanalytic Electronic Publishing for being in the top 5% of authors in 2011 and has remained in the top 5% through 2018 (the last year for which there are figures).
