= Donald Trump and handshakes =

Public attention surrounding the handshakes of Donald Trump

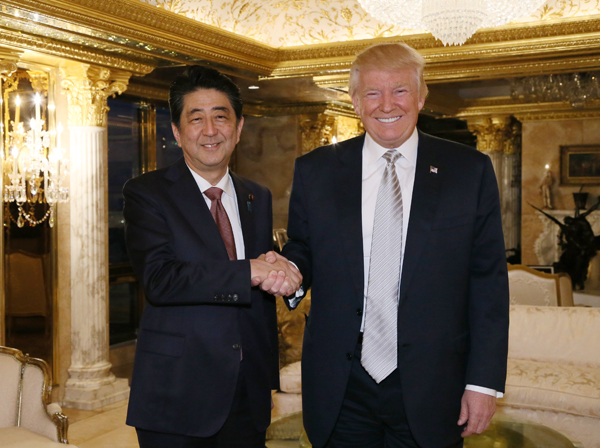
Prime minister of Japan, Shinzō Abe and Trump, November 17, 2016

The handshakes of Donald Trump, the 45th and 47th president of the United States, with world leaders have been the subject of extensive commentary. Scholars have noted that politicians' handshakes are usually unnoticed or restricted to silent interpretation by the participants, and only in the case of Trump do they appear to receive widespread media attention.

Notable incidents of handshakes (and avoidance of handshakes) have included interactions with French president Emmanuel Macron, Japanese prime minister Shinzo Abe, Canadian prime minister Justin Trudeau, German chancellor Angela Merkel, and U.S. leaders including FBI director James Comey and Supreme Court justice nominee Neil Gorsuch. The same characteristic or mannerism was identified during Trump's 2016 presidential campaign, although it was not widely reported on at the time. The Washington Post reported that "Trump has a habit of sharing awkward, intense and sometimes downright strange handshakes with world leaders", who prepare themselves to counteract the handshake from Trump.

The Guardian said Trump's handshake style is a way to assert his superiority, and the New Statesman called it a show of masculinity. Psychology professor Florin Dolcos finds it to be a part of Trump's strategic way of interacting with world leaders. Commentators claim that Trump has germophobic views relating to handshaking; at times, he has deemed handshaking to be "barbaric, disgusting and very, very terrible". Trump's approach to handshaking became even more a subject of debate during the COVID-19 pandemic, when he predicted that the social convention might come to an end, but as a politician he would continue shaking hands due to its "deep-seated symbolic meaning".

== Notable handshakes ==
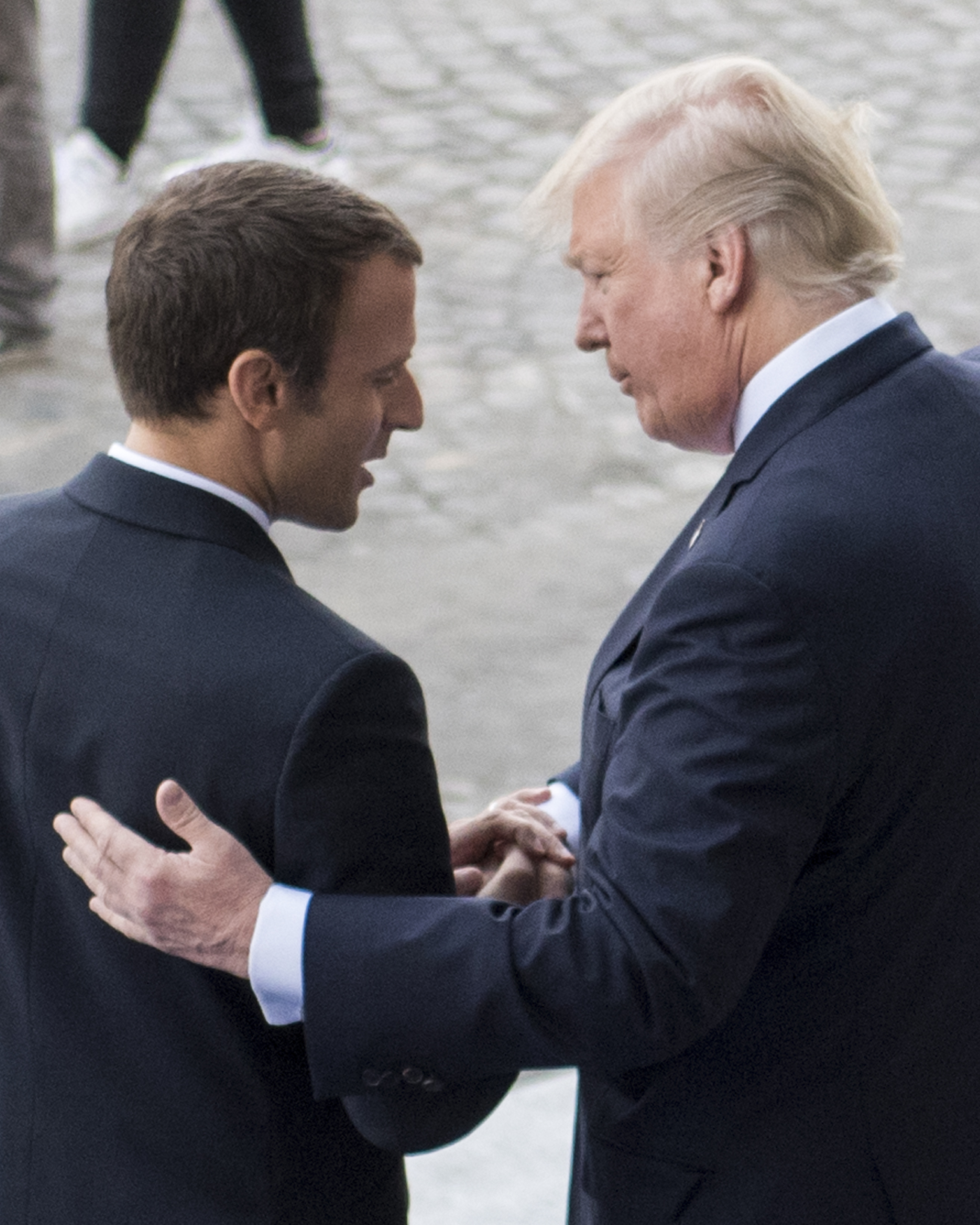
U.S. president Donald Trump shaking hands with French president Emmanuel Macron on Bastille Day, July 14, 2017

- Director of the FBI James Comey, on January 22, 2017: Trump reportedly "pulled in Comey with that signature tug and an attempted hug", which was said to have "appalled" Comey.
- Prime Minister of Japan Shinzo Abe, on February 10, 2017: their handshake lasted 19 seconds, visibly disconcerting Abe and prompting "a memorable eye-roll from the Japanese leader".
- Prime Minister of Canada Justin Trudeau, on February 13, 2017: their handshake attracted attention for Trudeau's "notably strong, extended grip with Mr. Trump".
- Supreme Court Justice nominee Neil Gorsuch, at his April 7, 2017, nomination ceremony: Gorsuch was reportedly "almost jerked... off his feet" by Trump, who "yank[ed] the judge towards him as if he were a pet dog on a leash".
- President of France Emmanuel Macron, at the May 25, 2017, NATO summit: a five-second-long handshake, in which Macron's knuckles reportedly turned white and Trump "appeared to painfully twist [Macron's] arm"; and on Bastille Day, July 14, 2017: a 29-second-long encounter that was covered extensively, including a second-by-second commentary by CNN's Chris Cillizza.
- May 2017: Donald Trump accidentally walks away halfway through handshake with Israeli prime minister Benjamin Netanyahu.

== Reactions ==
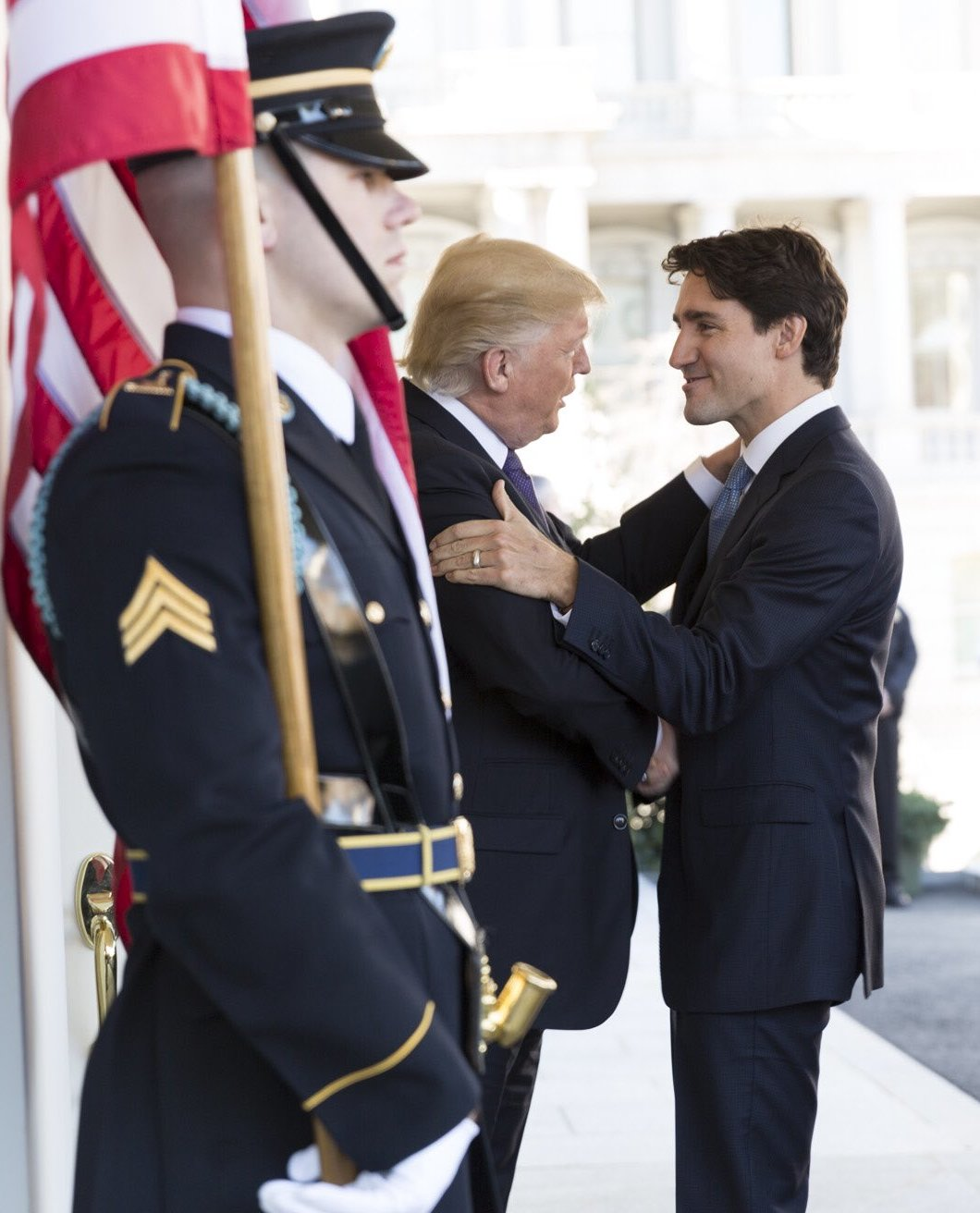
Prime minister of Canada, Justin Trudeau at the White House, February 13, 2017

Macron said that his five-second handshake with Trump in July was deliberate. He said, "My handshake with him was not innocent." He continued, "We need to show that we won't make small concessions, even symbolic ones, while not over-hyping things either." Macron elaborated on shows of strength expressed by world leaders: "Donald Trump, the Turkish president or the Russian president believe in the logic of the trial of strength, which doesn't bother me. I don't believe in the diplomacy of public invective, but in my bilateral dialogues, I don't let anything pass, that is how we are respected."

Trump said of his handshakes with Macron, "He's a great guy–smart, strong, loves holding my hand." Trump said, "People don't realize he loves holding my hand... that's good, as far as that goes." Trump explained, "I mean, really. He's a very good person... a tough guy, but look, he has to be. I think he is going to be a terrific president of France. But he does love holding my hand."

The Independent reported, "Some world leaders have started preparing for a handshake-showdown with the president. Canadian Prime Minister Justin Trudeau attracted attention for his notably strong, extended grip with Mr Trump when the two met in February." VOA News, a media outlet funded by the U.S. government, analyzed a series of Trump handshakes, "Since Trump took office on January 20, many world leaders, and even American politicians, have discovered they need to be ready for an unusual handshake from the U.S. president."

== Analysis ==
=== Media analysis ===
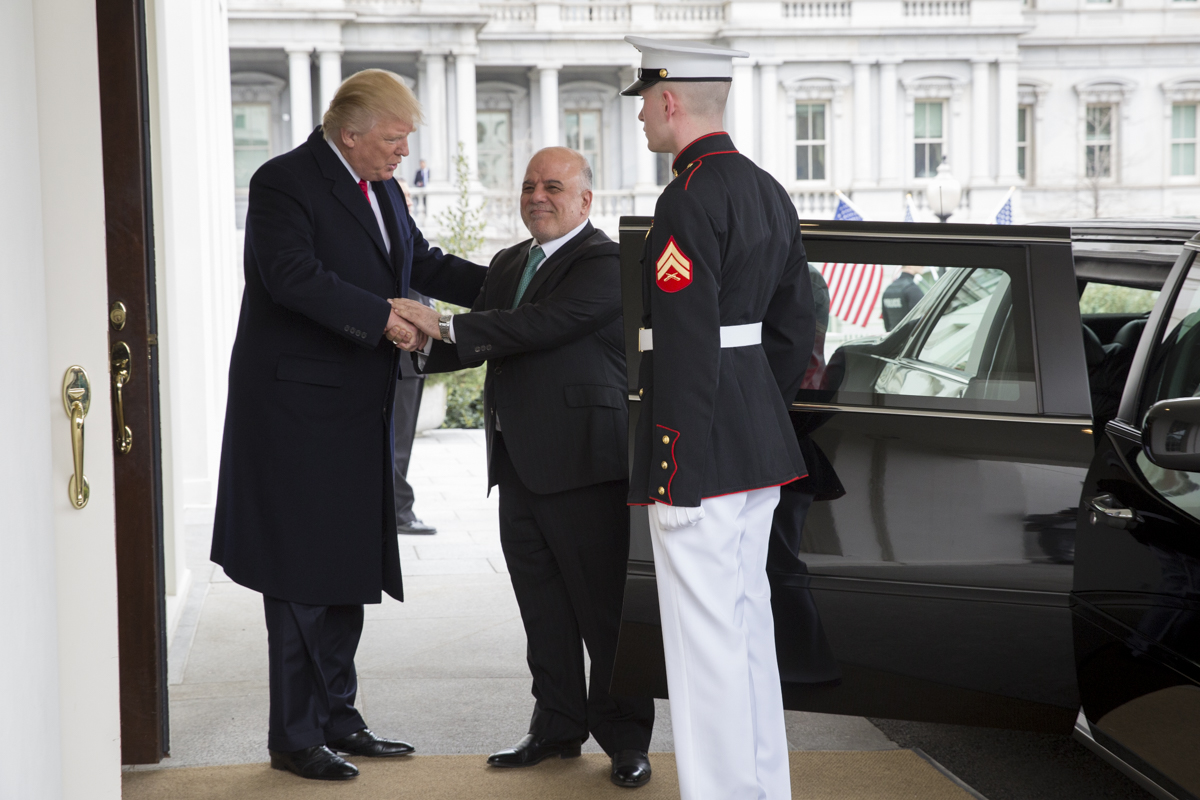
Prime minister of Iraq, Haider al-Abadi on March 20, 2017

CNN performed a second-by-second analysis of Trump's handshake with Macron. CNN editor-at-large Chris Cillizza wrote, "President Donald Trump added to the growing lore of his handshakes with world leaders on Friday in France when he and French president Emmanuel Macron spent 29 seconds in a shake that turned into something much, much more." The Guardian journalist Peter Collett commented, "Another way Trump reminds people of his superior status is by patting them on the arm or back during or after the handshake, and if the other person is so bold as to pat him back, he trumps them by producing an additional, terminal pat." Another reporter at The Guardian, Moustafa Bayoumi wrote, "it really is beginning to look like you can read Donald Trump's foreign policy by the bizarre ways that he shakes the hands of foreign leaders." National Review journalist Noah Daponte-Smith commented, "the handshake between President Trump, visiting Paris for the occasion, and Emmanuel Macron, the recently elected French president. Trump has already achieved notoriety for his awkward handshakes, but this one is truly something to behold."

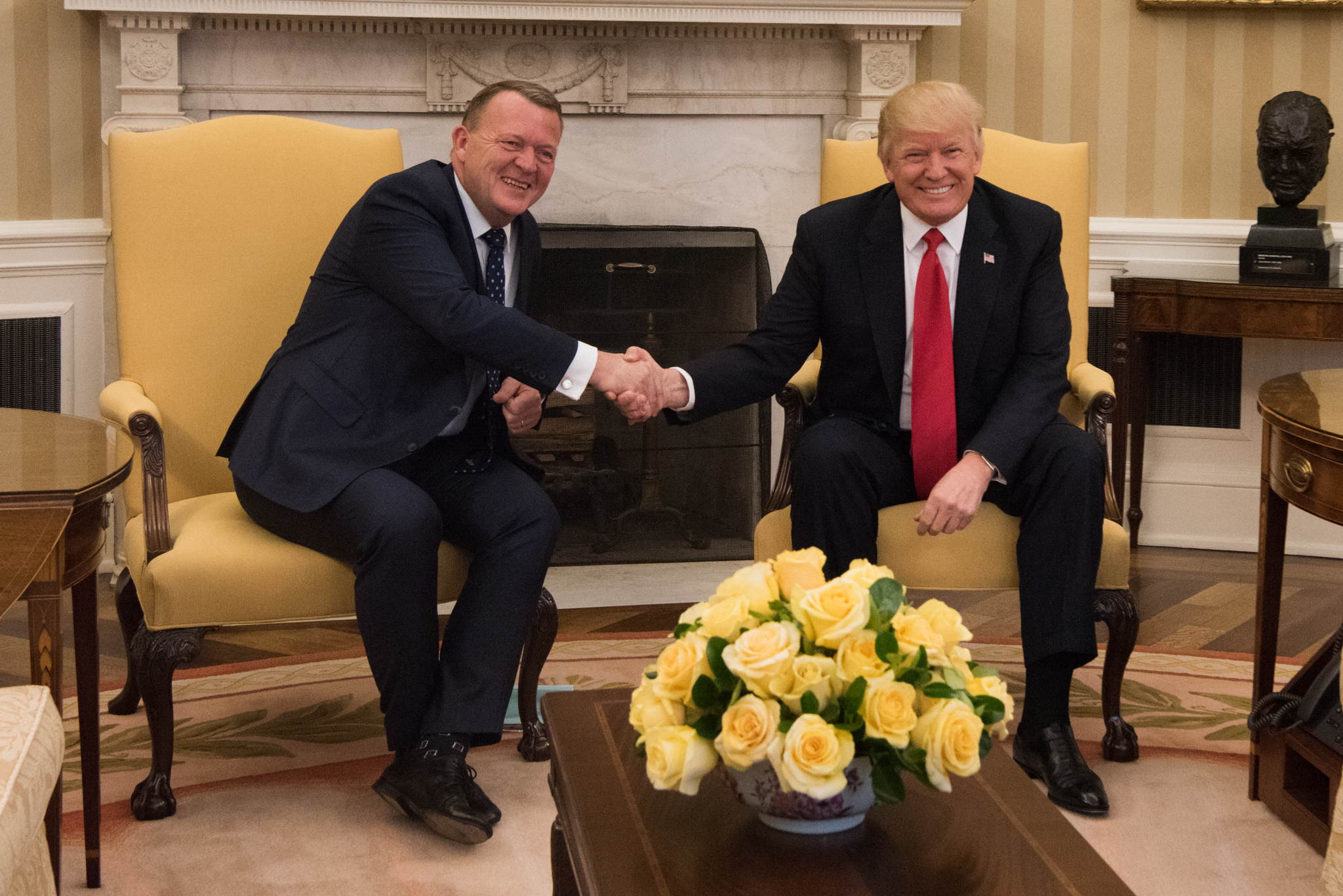
Prime minister of Denmark, Lars Løkke Rasmussen in the Oval Office, March 30, 2017

Daponte-Smith observed the attention placed on Trump's handshakes with other world leaders, "Trump's conduct toward his fellow heads of state, both in one-on-one meetings and in larger groups, has become a topic of great interest over the last few months: his handshakes with Justin Trudeau, Angela Merkel, and Shinzo Abe have also attracted great attention." New Statesman journalist Ruby Lott-Lavigna commented, "For President Trump, masculinity lies in the act of a handshake." The Financial Times noted that Trump is a self-confessed "germaphobe" who once said handshakes were "barbaric". New Statesman analyzed different tactics used by Trump for different world leaders. The Independent consulted psychologists who described the handshakes as a "tactical" move. The New York Times also consulted a body language expert who said this prolonged interaction was an attempt by each to show dominance.

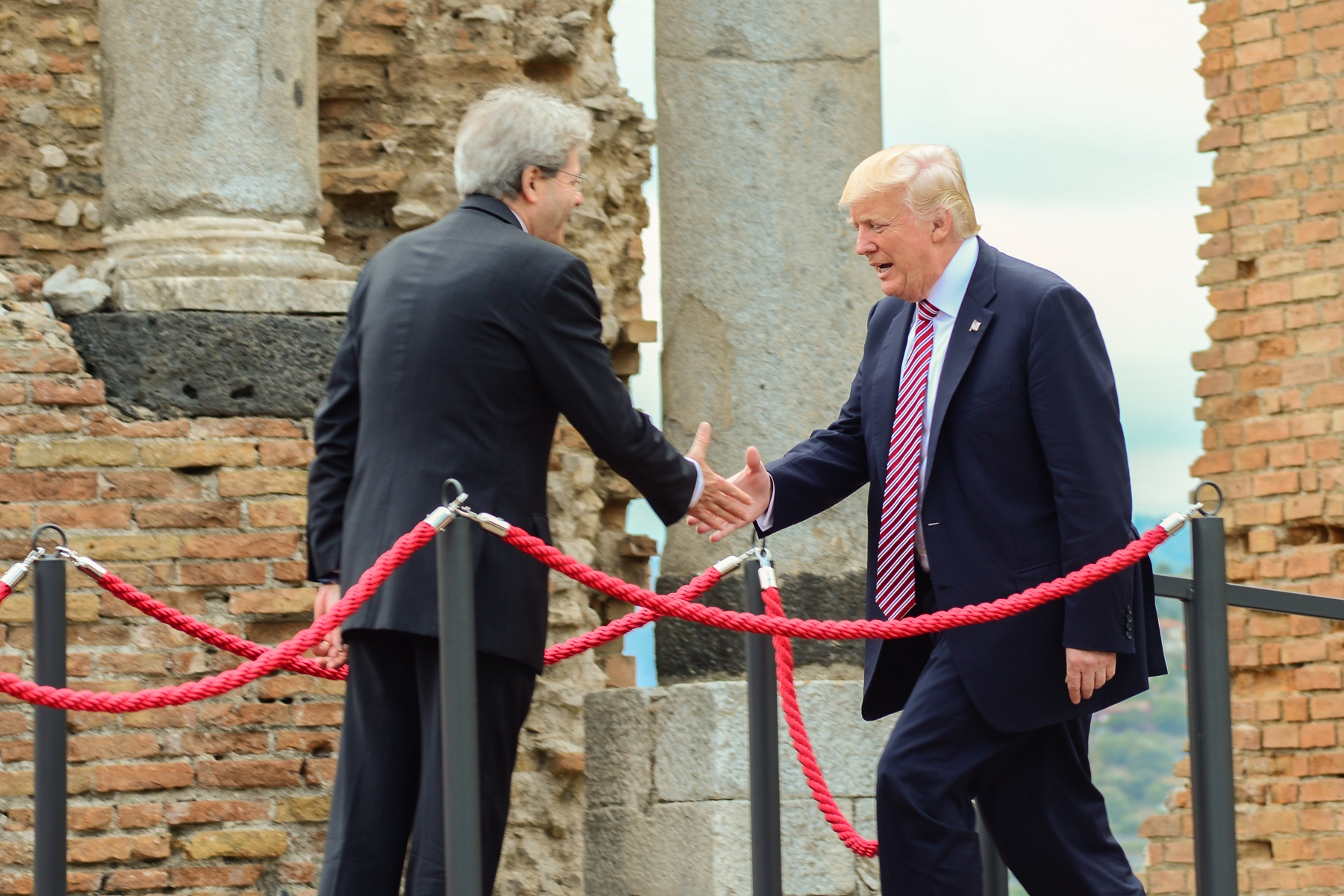
Paolo Gentiloni during the 43rd G7 summit, May 26, 2017

Time provided a chronology of Trump's handshakes over time, noting, "Newly inaugurated French President Emmanuel Macron drew international headlines when his knuckles turned white during an intense handshake with President Donald Trump at the G-7 meeting." Time observed, "Sometimes, a lack of a handshake says even more. The President drew similar fanfare when he declined to shake the hand of Angela Merkel, the chancellor of Germany, when she visited the White House." The Washington Post reporter Peter W. Stevenson commented, "Trump has a habit of sharing awkward, intense and sometimes downright strange handshakes with world leaders and U.S. officials." Stevenson contacted William Chaplin, a professor and the psychology department chair at St. John's University in Queens, New York, for behavioral analysis of Trump's handshakes. Chaplin noted, "People with good handshakes tended to be more outgoing, more socially at ease, less socially anxious." VOA News interviewed Success Signals author Patti Wood and Asheville, North Carolina mayor Esther Manheimer about the phenomenon. Wood observed Trudeau attempting to turn his experience with Trump into a "power handshake" by placing his hand on Trump's arm. The New York Times reporter Katie Rogers noted, "Analyzing President Trump's handshakes with world leaders has become something of a sport." The New York Times consulted etiquette author Jacqueline Whitmore and body language instructor Chris Ulrich to analyze Trump's handshakes with world leaders. Ulrich noted, "The bottom line is that in every one of these, Trump takes up real estate in other world leaders' heads." Whitmore analyzed Trump's handshake with Macron, saying it "Looks like both men are in a battle to establish their dominance and control."

=== Academic analysis ===
Trump's handshakes have been studied as a form of social ritual and semiotics. From an international relations perspective, Ben O'Loughlin, professor of international relations at Royal Holloway, University of London, conceptualizes Trump's handshakes with world leaders as being standoffs with a signalling effect: "moments of uncertainty when nobody knows what will happen, including the people shaking hands... [which] signal, together, Trump's standoff with international relations per se."

== Bibliography ==
=== Academic publications ===
- Dunn, George A. (2018). "The Strongman, the Small Man, and the Gentleman. Confucius and Donald Trump: What's in a Handshake?". Trump and Political Philosophy: Leadership, Statesmanship, and Tyranny. Springer International Publishing. pp. 100–103. ISBN 978-3-319-74445-2.
- O'Loughlin, Ben (October 18, 2018). "The Big Standoff: Trump's Handshakes and the Limits of News Values". Trump's Media War. Cham: Springer International Publishing. pp. 143–157. doi:10.1007/978-3-319-94069-4_10. ISBN 978-3-319-94068-7. S2CID 158147167.
- Oxlund, Bjarke (January 2, 2020). "An Anthropology of the Handshake". Anthropology Now. 12 (1). Informa UK Limited: 39–44. doi:10.1080/19428200.2020.1761216. ISSN 1942-8200. S2CID 221067127.
- Wignell, Peter; O'Halloran, Kay; Tan, Sabine (November 20, 2018). "Semiotic space invasion: The case of Donald Trump's US presidential campaign". Semiotica. 2019 (226). Walter de Gruyter GmbH: 185–208. doi:10.1515/sem-2017-0109. ISSN 1613-3692. S2CID 149965586.

=== Media ===
- Cauterucci, Christina (March 13, 2020). "The Masculine Bluster of Trump's Coronavirus Hand-Shaking Tour". Slate Magazine.
- Crump, James (February 11, 2021). "Trump has handshake of 'primitive jungle scene' and attention span of a 'squirrel'". The Independent.
- Kruse, Michael (March 18, 2020). "Coronavirus Gave Trump the Handshake-free World He Always Wanted". POLITICO.
- Park, William (January 21, 2020). "How not to shake someone's hand". BBC Future.
- Sanchez, Luis (June 9, 2018). "Trump's intense handshake with Macron leads to viral photo". The Hill.
- Vesoulis, Abby (July 2, 2018). "How President Trump Turned Handshakes Into a High-Stakes Showdown". Time.
