= Bandy X. Lee =

American psychiatrist (born 1970)

Bandy Lee
- Lee in 2018
- Born: 27 May 1970; New York City, U.S.
- Education: Yale University (MD, MDiv) Harvard University
- Medical career
- Profession: Forensic psychiatrist
- Institutions: Yale School of Medicine (2003 - 2020); Harvard Medical School (2021 - )
- Sub-specialties: Violence prevention
- Notable works: Profile of a Nation: Trump's Mind, America's Soul (author) The Dangerous Case of Donald Trump (editor, contributor) Violence: An Interdisciplinary Approach to Causes, Consequences, and Cures (author)
- Awards: National Research Service Award

Bandy Xenobia Lee is an American psychiatrist whose scholarly work includes a textbook on violence. She is a specialist in public health approaches to violence prevention who consulted with the World Health Organization and initiated reforms at New York's Rikers Island Correctional Facility. She helped draft the United Nations chapter on "Violence Against Children", leads a project group for the WHO's Violence Prevention Alliance, and has contributed to prison reform in the United States and around the world. She taught at Yale School of Medicine and Yale Law School from 2003 to 2020 and then at Harvard Medical School until 2024.

In 2017, Lee organized a conference at Yale on the mental health of Donald Trump. Participating psychiatrists included Robert Jay Lifton and Judith Lewis Herman. After the conference, in March 2017, the American Psychiatric Association released a statement reaffirming the Goldwater rule that restricts comments related to public figures' mental health without their consent or evaluation. Lee characterized the statement as silencing concerns raised by psychiatrists about the Trump presidency and violating the more important Geneva Declaration.

Lee reconvened the conference the next month, and later in the year edited The Dangerous Case of Donald Trump, a collection of essays warning about Trump's mental instability that became a New York Times bestseller. It was reported that White House Chief of Staff John F. Kelly secretly consulted the book as a guide for dealing with Trump. Using it as an "owner's manual", he intervened to stop Trump from ordering the use of nuclear weapons.

In 2017 and 2018, Lee met with over 50 U.S. Congress members who considered the 25th Amendment. In 2019, she held an interdisciplinary conference at the National Press Club that discussed impeachment and was broadcast by C-SPAN.

In 2020, Yale University failed to renew Lee's unpaid medical faculty position for allegedly breaking the Goldwater rule in a speech about Trump and Alan Dershowitz. Lee sued Yale for breach of contract and breach of implied duty of good faith and fair dealing, but after an unexplained switch of judges to Trump-nominated Sarah A. L. Merriam, the suit was dismissed in August 2022. Lee appealed, but on June 20, 2023, the appellate court, to which Merriam had been promoted, although she was not on the panel that heard Lee's appeal, upheld the ruling. Lee warned against the silencing of intellectuals and criticized Yale's declaration of "no obligation to academic freedom" in her case as "abandoning its principles in a time of greatest need."

In August 2022, Mother Jones published the article "The Psychiatrist Who Warned Us That Donald Trump Would Unleash Violence Was Absolutely Right". It argues that the January 6 attacks were Lee's "vindication".

In late 2023, Lee warned that a third Trump candidacy for president was in danger of succeeding "not by rational persuasion or informed choice, but through the 'contagion' of his symptoms." In May 2024, she published The Psychology of Trump Contagion: An Existential Danger to American Democracy and All Humankind. In September 2024, Lee organized another interdisciplinary conference at the National Press Club, convening national security experts and mental health experts. She simultaneously released The More Dangerous Case of Donald Trump: 40 Psychiatrists and Mental Health Experts Warn Anew. In October 2024, Forbes published an article with a picture of Trump's former Chairman of the Joint Chiefs of Staff Mark Milley holding Lee's 2017 book The Dangerous Case of Donald Trump.

== Early life and education ==
Bandy Lee was born and raised in the Bronx, New York. She is of Korean descent. Her mother was Inmyung Lee. As a teenager, Lee volunteered in Harlem as a tutor for homeless African-American children. Her grandfather was Geun-Young Lee, a physician who treated patients in need of care after the Korean War, who Lee says inspired her with a belief that practicing medicine also involves social responsibility.

Lee received her M.D. from the Yale University School of Medicine in 1994 and a Master of Divinity (M.Div.) from Yale Divinity School in 1995. She completed her medical internship at the Bellevue Hospital Center in New York. During her medical residency at the Massachusetts General Hospital, Lee was designated as the chief resident. She was then a research fellow at Harvard Medical School. Upon completion, she was offered a faculty position at Harvard University but turned it down to return to Yale.

== Career ==
Lee studied the anthropology of violence in East Africa as a fellow of the National Institute of Mental Health and co-authored academic papers on Côte d'Ivoire, Tanzania, and Rwanda. She is a specialist in violence prevention programs in prisons and in the community and worked for several years in maximum security prisons in the U.S., where she was instrumental in initiating reforms at New York's Rikers Island jail complex. She has consulted with five different U.S. states on prison reform.

Lee was director of research for the Center for the Study of Violence and, with Kaveh Khoshnood, founded Yale University's Violence and Health Study Group. She heads a project group of the Violence Prevention Alliance for the World Health Organization that contributes to increasing the evidence base on interventions that work to prevent interpersonal violence in low- and middle-income countries. She helped draft United Nations Secretary-General Kofi Annan's chapter on "Violence Against Children" and is the author of the textbook Violence: An Interdisciplinary Approach to Causes, Consequences, and Cures.

=== Comments and work related to Donald Trump ===
In April 2017, Lee hosted a meeting at Yale University medical school to discuss the ethics of speaking about the dangers of Donald Trump. The assembled psychiatrists decided they had a "duty to warn". After the conference, in a May 2017 interview with Salon, Lee said that Trump suffered from mental impairments and due to his holding the presidency, the situation amounted to a "state of emergency", saying, "our survival as a species may be at stake". She also discussed her views that link what she sees as increasing inequality in the United States to a deterioration in collective mental health. Later in 2017, she edited The Dangerous Case of Donald Trump, a book of essays alleging that Trump has psychological problems that make him dangerous. After the book's publication, she reported receiving thousands of threatening messages by letter, telephone, and on social media that included death threats.

In December 2017, she met 12 members of the United States Congress (11 Democrats, 1 Republican) to give them her opinion on Trump's psychological dangers, and reportedly said he was "unraveling". In a letter to the New England Journal of Medicine, Jeffrey Lieberman, past president of the APA, argued that Lee and her co-authors were guilty of a "misguided and dangerous morality". Lee says that Lieberman was instrumental to shutting down what had by that time become "the number one topic of national discussion", while simultaneously himself violating the Goldwater rule.

Lee says that when meeting with lawmakers, she was adhering to the American Psychiatric Association's guideline, which precedes the Goldwater rule and urges psychiatrists "to serve society by advising and consulting with the executive, legislative, and judiciary branches of the government." In an interview she also said, "whenever the Goldwater rule is mentioned, we should also refer to the Declaration of Geneva, established by the World Medical Association 25 years earlier, which mandates physicians to speak up if there are humanitarian reasons to do so. This Declaration was created in response to the experience of Nazism."

Since that time, two investigative articles have claimed that the APA actions with regard to the Goldwater rule were taken to protect the APA's federal funding. Lieberman was one of the beneficiaries. Lee said, "Americans had to learn to do without expertise, just as it has with the pandemic, and the results have been equally devastating." She said that mental health experts predicted the mismanagement of a pandemic that resulted in a total of half a million deaths by shortly after the end of the Trump presidency.

In her Profile of a Nation, published on October 1, 2020, Lee warned of a violent reaction after an election loss, writing, "he is truly someone who would do anything, no matter how terrible, no matter how destructive, to stay in power." Bill Moyers, who interviewed her shortly after the January 6, 2021, Trump-incited U.S. Capitol attack, called her "the least surprised person in the country". He had praised her 2017 book as "profound, illuminating and discomforting". On January 9, 2021, Lee was among World Mental Health Coalition (WMHC) colleagues who called for quick removal of Trump from office, and she made recommendations for how to encourage his followers to escape his influence. At this time, Lee and her colleagues at the WMHC drafted and published the first-ever Declaration of the Freedom of Mind.

On January 17, 2021, Lee and Jeffrey D. Sachs wrote the essay One Group Who Knew All Along How Dangerous Trump Was: Mental Health Experts, in which they proposed "adjusting the 25th Amendment to ensure that it can be applied to dangerous psychological disorders [...] and taking steps to reduce the powers of the presidency so that the nation is not vulnerable to the whims of one mentally unbalanced individual", as well as changing the restraining standards (the Goldwater Rule) imposed on APA members in such circumstances.

=== Termination from Yale University ===
On January 2, 2020, Richard Painter asked Lee on Twitter about Alan Dershowitz's response—that he had a "perfect" sex life—to Virginia Giuffre, who had sued him for sexual assault. Lee tweeted, "Alan Dershowitz’s employing the odd use of 'perfect'—not even a synonym—might be dismissed as ordinary influence in most contexts. However, given the severity and spread of 'shared psychosis' among just about all of Donald Trump’s followers, a different scenario is more likely... Which scenario? That he has wholly taken on Trump’s symptoms by contagion. There is even proof: his bravado toward his opponent with a question about his own sex life—in a way that is irrelevant to the actual lawsuit—shows the same grandiosity and delusional-level impunity."

Dershowitz publicly objected to Lee's characterization, writing, "Dr. Bandy Lee has never met me, never examined me, never seen my medical records, and never spoken to anyone close to me. Yet she is prepared to offer a diagnosis of 'psychosis' which she attributes to my being one of President Trump's 'followers.' ...Indeed, Dr. Lee went even further, diagnosing 'the severity and spread of "shared psychosis" among just about all of Donald Trump's followers.' ...She is literally claiming that we are mentally ill and our views should be considered symptoms of our illness, rather than as legitimate ideas." According to Lee, Dershowitz also emailed officials at Yale stating, "This constitutes a serious violation of the ethics rules of the American Psychiatric Association. I am formally asking that association to discipline Dr. Lee."

According to Lee, John Krystal, chair of the psychiatry department at Yale, immediately called her to a meeting. This was in stark contrast to his affirmation of her free speech rights less than two years earlier. She requested an investigation but did not hear back until her termination letter on May 17, 2020. After multiple inquiries, on September 4, 2020, Krystal wrote: "your repeated violations of the APA's Goldwater Rule and your inappropriate transfer of the duty to warn from the treatment setting to national politics" were the reasons for her termination. It may also have been a response to a letter by Gregory Scholtz, the president of the American Association of University Professors (AAUP), also dated September 4, 2020: "The interest of our Association in the case of Dr. Lee arises from its longstanding commitment to basic tenets of academic freedom and due process.... Under the 1940 Statement, 'College and university teachers are citizens, members of a learned profession, and officers of an educational institution. When they speak or write as citizens, they should be free from institutional censorship or discipline.... [e]xtramural utterances rarely bear upon the faculty member’s fitness for continuing service.'" In March 2021, Lee sued Yale University over the termination, claiming breach of contract, breach of good faith and wrongful termination. She has also continued to deny that she has broken the Goldwater rule, saying that "danger" is not a diagnosis: "While an in-person interview can be quite useful, it is not strictly required to assess danger."

In response to the news, Laurence Tribe of Harvard Law School tweeted, "This is a disgusting way for any university to act. Dr. Bandy Lee should never have been fired." Jeffrey Sachs of Columbia University said, "Yale blundered badly by siding with the APA's gag rule rather than the right—indeed responsibility—of its faculty to speak out against a dangerous president." Cornel West, who himself said he was recently denied tenure at Harvard because of his speech, said, "I wholeheartedly stand in solidarity with Bandy Lee, a brilliant and wonderful sister and professor!" A letter signed by prominent colleagues asked Krystal, "[Since] contributors to this book which Dr. Lee edited include many scholars and international exemplars of psychiatric ethics, we wonder if they too would be terminated were they to be members of your department." Several op-eds on academic freedom and the Goldwater Rule were published by prominent public intellectuals, and at least two petitions were in motion for Lee's reinstatement. Yale has since come under fire for its stance on academic freedom, while Lee has received other faculty invitations.

Yale's motion to dismiss Lee's lawsuit was granted on August 30, 2022. According to Lee, after Yale's first motion to dismiss was denied, the judge ruling in her favor "was promptly replaced without cause or explanation." Lee has repeatedly warned that "muzzling of intellectuals and journalists ... is the first sign of tyranny." On September 15, 2022, the junior federal judge who ruled in Yale University's favor was promoted to appellate court, surpassing senior judges. On June 20, 2023, a three judge panel of the same appellate court, consisting of judges appointed by Presidents Clinton, Trump, and Biden, upheld the previous ruling against Lee. In the process, Yale renounced on court record all obligation to academic freedom, which the Foundation for Individual Rights and Expression called "a giant leap backward for faculty rights and a stain on Yale's legacy."

== Selected publications ==
- "Detecting depressive disorder with a 19-item local instrument in Tanzania." International Journal of Social Psychiatry, Vol. 54 (2008), pp. 21–33. (With S.F. Kaaya, J.K. Mbwambo, M.C. Smith-Fawzi, & M.T. Leshabari)
- "Preventing gender-based violence engendered by conflict: The case of Côte d’Ivoire." Social Science and Medicine, Vol. 146 (2015), pp. 341–347. (With M. Blay-Tofey)
- "A reflection on the madness in prisons", Stanford Law and Policy Review, Vol. 26 (2015), pp. 253–268. (With M. Prabhu)
- "Health system re-design following sexual violence during the genocide in Rwanda." International Journal of Public Health, Vol. 61 (2016), pp. 959–960. (With G. Uwizeye & T. Kroll)
- "Transforming our world: Implementing the 2030 agenda through sustainable development goal indicators." Journal of Public Health Policy, Vol. 37 (2016), pp. 13–31. (With F. Kjaerulf, S. Turner, L. Cohen, P.D. Donnelly, R. Muggah, R. Davis et al.)
- "Global research priorities for interpersonal violence prevention: A modified Delphi study." Bulletin of the World Health Organization, Vol. 95 (2017), pp. 36–48. (With C.R. Mikton, M. Tanaka, M. Tomlinson, D.L. Streiner, L. Tonmyr, J. Fisher et al.)
- The Dangerous Case of Donald Trump: 27 Psychiatrists and Mental Health Experts Assess a President. Thomas Dunne Books, 2017. (Editor) ISBN 978-1250179456
- Violent States and Creative States: From the Global to the Individual. Vol. 1: Structural Violence and Creative Structures. Jessica Kingsley Publishers, 2018. (With J. Adlam & T. Kluttig) ISBN 978-1785925641
- Violent States and Creative States: From the Global to the Individual. Vol. 2: Human Violence and Creative Humanity. Jessica Kingsley Publishers, 2018. (With J. Adlam & T. Kluttig) ISBN 978-1785925658
- Violence: An Interdisciplinary Approach to Causes, Consequences, and Cures. Wiley-Blackwell, 2019. ISBN 978-1119240693
- The Dangerous Case of Donald Trump: 37 Psychiatrists and Mental Health Experts Assess a President. Thomas Dunne Books, 2019. (Editor) ISBN 978-1250212863
- "Government political structure and gender differences in violent death: A longitudinal analysis of forty-three countries, 1960–2008." Aggression and Violent Behavior, Vol. 46 (2019), pp. 174–179. (With M. Blay-Tofey, P. Marotta, K.K. Schuder & J. Gilligan)
- "Government political structure and violent death rates: A longitudinal analysis of forty-three countries, 1960–2008." Aggression and Violent Behavior, Vol. 47 (2019), pp. 262–267. (With P. Marotta, M. Blay-Tofey, K.K. Schuder, C.H. Kim, G. Lee & J. Gilligan)
- "Addressing the elephant in the room: Stories of ethical activism in the age of Trump." Journal of Humanistic Psychology, Vol. 60 (2020), pp. 459–462. (With H. West & S. Wruble)
- "How we each emerged from isolation, found each other and a common voice." Journal of Humanistic Psychology, Vol. 60 (2020), pp. 463–476. (With L.L. Glass & E.B. Fisher).
- Profile of a Nation: Trump's Mind, America's Soul. World Mental Health Coalition, 2020. ISBN 978-1735553740
- Psychopathy Checklist-Revised | Second Edition, Hare, R. D., Hare Psychopathy Checklist-Revised | Second Edition
- Silence versus bearing witness: Psychiatrists' responsibility to society. Forensic Science International: Mind and Law, Vol. 2 (2021), 100069.
- Societal disorder as a precursor to dangerous minds in politics. International Journal of Forensic Psychotherapy, Vol. 4 (2022), pp. 184–191.
- Dangerous leadership and a culture of violence: Shared psychosis in the age of Donald Trump. Cultura & Psyché, Vol. 4 (2023), pp. 109–120.
- Power and abuse of power. Encyclopedia of Heroism Studies. Springer International, 2023. (With G. Lee)

== See also ==
- Twenty-fifth Amendment to the United States Constitution
- Declaration of Geneva
