= Pep =

Pep is energy or high spirits; it may refer to:

- Pep band, an ensemble of instrumentalists
- Pep (dog) (c. 1923–1930), Labrador Retriever sent to the Eastern State Penitentiary
- Pep, the dog in Putt-Putt (series)
- Pep, a Neilson Dairy confectionery brand
- Pep, New Mexico
- Pep, Texas
- Pep Cereal, by Kellogg
- Pep Comics, by MLJ Comics
- Pep (South Africa), a major South African clothing chain store
- Pep rally, gathering before a school sporting event
- Pep talk, motivational lecture
- Pep Clotet (born 1977), Spanish football manager
- Pep Guardiola (born 1971), Spanish football manager
- Pep Lijnders (born 1983), Dutch football manager
- Willie Pep (1922–2006), American boxer
- Pep (album), an album by Lights
- Pep (film), an upcoming sports drama film

== See also ==
- PEP (disambiguation)
