= Andrew Chadwick =

British political communication researcher

Andrew Chadwick (born December 1970) is a British political communication researcher. His work focuses on the fields of political communication, including mobilisation, news and journalism, political engagement, and deception and misinformation. He is Professor of Political Communication at Loughborough University, where he is also director of the Online Civic Culture Centre (O3C). His latest book The Hybrid Media System: Politics and Power was released in 2013 and in a second edition in 2017.

== Early life and education ==
Chadwick completed his PhD under the supervision of Professor Rodney Barker at the London School of Economics. His thesis later became his first book, Augmenting Democracy: Political Movements and Constitutional Reform During the Rise of Labour, 1900–1924.

== Career ==
Chadwick was the head of department in politics and international relations at Royal Holloway, University of London from 2006 to 2009. He was also the founder and co-director, with Professor Ben O'Loughlin, of the New Political Communication Unit based at Royal Holloway.

Chadwick has contributed to field-building in this area of communication studies. He edited the Handbook of Internet Politics with Philip N. Howard, and is the founder and editor of Oxford Studies in Digital Politics. He was awarded the American Sociological Association's Best Book Award (Communication and Information Technologies Section) in 2007 for his book Internet Politics: States, Citizens and New Communication Technologies. His most recent book, The Hybrid Media System: Politics and Power, offers a critical analysis of the exercise of power in a media system characterised by a meshing of media types.

In 2014 Chadwick was one of eight commissioners on the Commission on Civil Society and Democratic Engagement, launched in response to concerns raised regarding the UK Government's proposed Transparency of Lobbying, Non-party Campaigning and Trade Union Administration Bill.

Chadwick has contributed to, amongst others, The Independent, BBC Radio 4 (Today, World at One and Moral Maze), and The Daily Telegraph. In 2012, Chadwick was invited to speak at the Holberg Prize Symposium, where he delivered an address on the hybrid media system. He held a visiting position at the Oxford Internet Institute, University of Oxford.

== Selected publications ==
- Chadwick, Andrew, The Hybrid Media System: Politics and Power. Oxford: Oxford University Press, Second Edition, 2017.
- Chadwick, Andrew and Howard, Phillip N. eds. Handbook of Internet Politics. London: Routledge, 2009.
- Chadwick, Andrew, Internet Politics: States, Citizens, and New Communication Technologies, Oxford: Oxford University Press, 2006.
- Chadwick, Andrew and Heffernan, Richard, eds. The New Labour Reader. Cambridge: Polity, 2003.
- Chadwick, Andrew, Augmenting Democracy: Political Movements and Constitutional Reform During the Rise of Labour, 1900–1924. Aldershot: Ashgate Publishing, 1999.
