= Primate Equilibrium Platform =

Device used in animal experimentation

A Primate Equilibrium Platform (PEP) is a device used to train chimpanzees and other primates in maneuvers similar to those of a flight simulator. The chimpanzees are conditioned, with a series of electric shocks, to keep the rolling platform level.

== Composition ==
=== PEP I ===
The earlier model was maneuvered completely by the test subjects; each movement was in response to and an overcorrection of the motion preceding it.

=== PEP II ===
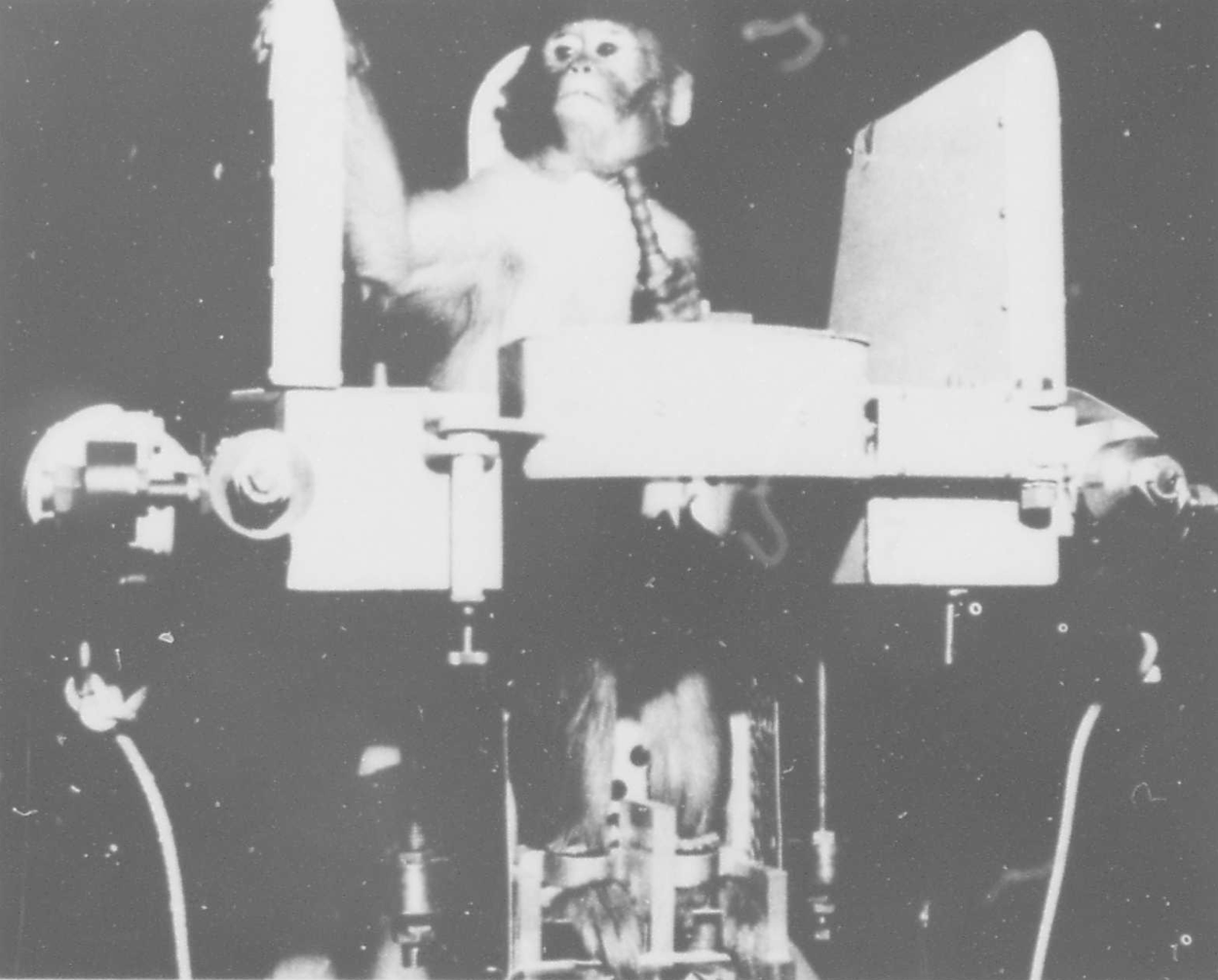
Primate in the PEP II

The joystick was moved from the right hand position to the center directly in front of each monkey to improve similarity and comparability of each test subject and trial. The integration of stronger central motors allowed for more rapid platform movement during the simulation, and stimulus-input programming contingencies allowed for better tracking of task responsiveness. Researchers were able to present test subjects with unpredictable tasks by altering waveforms and frequencies, and test subjects were given the complex psychomotor task of tracking incoming signals on the platform. The second model was monitored by a 7 channel Ampex recorder. The updated machinery provided the advantage of allowing both subtle behavioral changes and physiological radiation effects to be studied simultaneously.

The purpose of the platform is to determine primate competency under various levels of poisoning from radiation or chemicals used in common biological weaponry.

== Training and procedural processes ==
=== Restraint and adaptation ===
Rhesus monkey test subjects were held on aluminum couches with restraints around necks, ankles, and waists, but were given free hand movement. Test subjects were adapted to their restraints for a minimum of four hours before training procedures began.

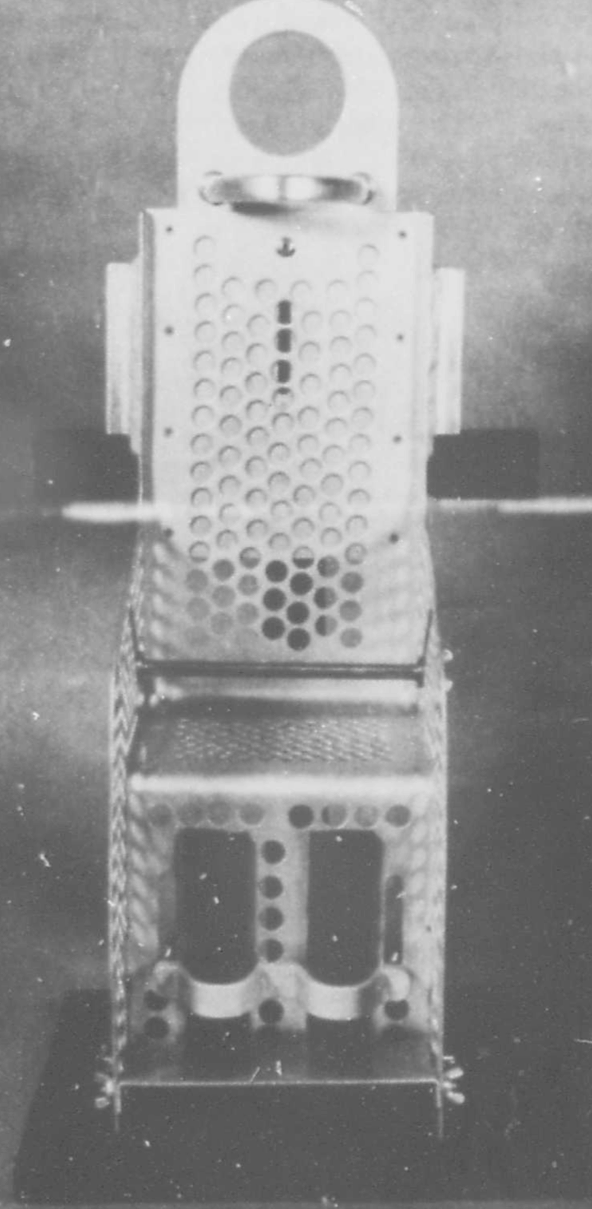
Restraining Aluminum Couch

=== Duration ===
Each primate went through the training process until they were able to sustain the horizontal positioning of the platform for 3.5 hours without breaks or rest. Fatigue was considered a negligible element of the training process.

=== Negative reinforcement ===
Shocks were delivered automatically to the sole of the test subject’s foot via spring-loaded footplates when deviation from the horizontal position would reach or exceed 15 degrees.

Shock intensity was 10 mA at 280 volts.

After the subject has successfully completed a seven phase training procedure on the platform, the primate is either irradiated or poisoned to determine how long it can keep the platform level at different degrees of exposure, with electric shocks resulting from inability to maintain a level platform.

== Purpose ==
The goal of the PEP research was to determine the ability of fighter pilots to deliver payloads in a second-strike scenario, in which the pilots may have been exposed to radiation or chemical or biological weapons. Relevance for military radiation experiments using non-human primates (NHPs) grew throughout the 20th century as the United States addressed threats of international warfare.

The use of rhesus monkeys in these experiments was designed to bridge knowledge gaps for military personnel between the laboratory and the field. The behavior of monkeys can be effectively compared and categorized with the behavior of humans in simulation environments, despite the test subjects lacking the capacity to perform tasks asked of the military. Primates were able to keep a simulator level within 1 degree of stabilization across the multiple axis on a 16 axis simulator.

=== School of Aerospace Medicine ===
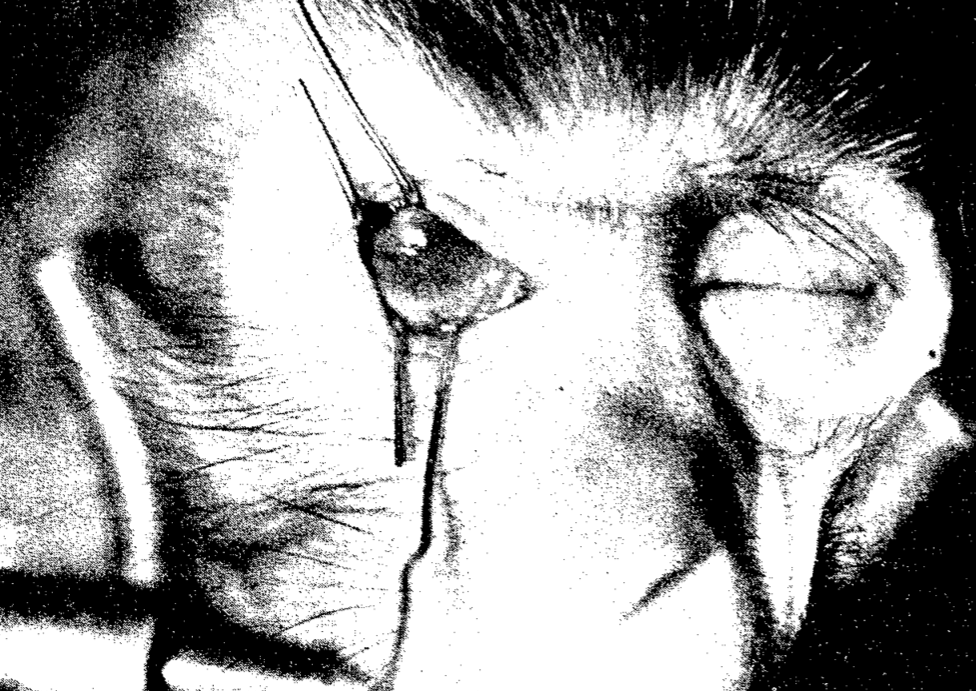
Rhesus monkey whose eyes were burned in radiation experiments.png

The USAF School of Aerospace Medicine's first use of NHPs in military radiation experiments occurred in 1957-58, where monkeys were placed at atomic test sites. Some primate test subjects were deployed as part of Operation PLUMBBOB, where many survivors were documented to have procured various cancers later in life. Prior to PEP experimenting, thousands of primates were used and died in experiments intended for preparedness for World War II, which aimed to study the effects of atomic fallout, radiation, beams, chemical warfare agents, and possible antidotes for said agents. Other test series from the School of Aerospace Medicine entailed inflicting laser beams to the eyes of monkeys.

=== General NHP Use ===
NHPs are widely used in military and biomedical research because of their physiological and psychological similarities to humans. Research with NHPs have helped to create vaccines and promote medical research, but have garnered concern from the public about the ethicality of their use in scientific research.

=== Ethical regulatory frameworks ===
Under the U.S. Animal Welfare Act via the 1990 amendments, environmental enrichment is required during experimentation with NHPs. In broader research ethics, the 3 R’s principle has been deployed.

The 3 R’s:

- Replacement of animals with non-animal experimentation practices
- Reduction of the number of animal test subjects used
- Refinement of scientific practices to reduce the suffering of animals when possible

The primary application of the program was based in White Sands.

== White Sands Experiments 1 and 2 ==
The experiments conducted at White Sands Missile Range were facilitated using the facility’s Fast Burst Reactor. Research was primarily motivated by the emergent awareness of a nuclear future and the necessity of an understanding of the effects of radiation on performance in military operations.

=== Experimental design ===
Two separate experiments were conducted four months apart from each other, with a defining difference of radiation dosage. In the first experiment, 13 rhesus monkeys were given a dose of 1000 rads, and in the second, 6 monkeys received an approximate dosage of 2500 rads. The duration of the first experiment was one hour, and the second experiment lasted for three hours. The major dependent variable of both experiments was the time spent horizontal, and the frequency of mistakes or performance degradation.

=== Findings ===
Results showed striking differences in performance quality in response to 1000 rads versus 2500 rads.

1000 rads prompted short-term severe impacts in performance in a smaller number of test subjects, while 2500 rads was shown to have more general and severe impacts on performance.

=== Adverse physiological impacts ===
Radiation exposure in PEP experiments caused:

- The occurrence of frequent vomiting in all test subjects
- One test subject vomiting 9 times, appearing physically weak despite the behavioral data obtained from the platform
- All monkey test subjects exhibiting retching, vomiting, anorexia, and declined mental health and interest in enrichment during and after experimentation
- A severity of symptoms unexpected for lower doses

== Benactyzine trials ==
Another subset of PEP experiments was conducted by the USAF School of Aerospace Medicine Radiation Sciences Division in March of 1981, to study the impacts of benactyzine on human pilots. Benactyzine, an anticholinergic drug proposed for the treatment of anticholinesterase poisoning from organophosphate compounds, was known to cause impairment and performance decrements in humans.

=== Experimental design ===
Five male rhesus monkeys between the weights of 5-7 lbs were utilized in this experiment. The experiment was conducted over periods of 3 hours, and injections were administered to the thigh in four randomly assigned sequences for each primate; 0.17; 0.054; 1.7; 0.54 mg/kg. Electric shocks were used as negative reinforcement, with each experiment prompting 0-4 shocks per testing period.

=== Findings ===
All monkeys exhibited degradations in performance at doses 0.54 and 1.7 mg/kg, but were commonly able to conduct certain tasks as normal while showing performance decline in other tasks. At 0.17 mg/kg, performance detriments were mild but observable. For most test subjects, the most severe impacts occurred within 30 minutes post-injection. The results yielded that humans are evidently more profoundly impacted by benactyzine than rhesus monkeys are. The threshold dosage for this experiment was concluded to be around 0.54 mg/kg, while 1.7 mg/kg was determined to produce debilitating effects on performance.

== 1979 Statements from Dr. Donald Barnes ==
Dr. Donald Barnes, one of the main researchers of the White Sands PEP experiments, gave a statement to the International Primate Protection League (IPPL) in 1979 in which he described operational practices and physiological effects on primate test subjects which were not disclosed in the experiment’s original reports. Barnes was relieved of his position within the USAF School of Aerospace Medicine for protesting the proposal of another monkey test trial. In his statement to the IPPL, he claimed that such experiments were not used in actuality to benefit man, but to further the demand for more animal experimentation. These later reflections revealed previously unknown information about the experiment including:

- The occurrence of many test subjects receiving shocks of the highest intensity to punish slow learners
- Injuries resulting from restraint devices, including the loss of teeth, abrasions along the abdomen, and chafed and bleeding ankles
- Personal experiences of being on death watch for test subjects post-experiment, monitoring what happened until subjects died in what was described miserable circumstances
- Frustration of many test subjects related to the devices of restraint, causing self-destructive behaviors such as the biting off of flesh from the arms or hands
