= Pairwise error probability =

Pairwise error probability is the error probability that for a transmitted signal ($X$) its corresponding but distorted version ($\widehat{X}$) will be received. This type of probability is called ″pair-wise error probability″ because the probability exists with a pair of signal vectors in a signal constellation. It's mainly used in communication systems.

== Expansion of the definition ==
In general, the received signal is a distorted version of the transmitted signal. Thus, we introduce the symbol error probability, which is the probability $P(e)$ that the demodulator will make a wrong estimation $(\widehat{X})$ of the transmitted symbol $(X)$ based on the received symbol, which is defined as follows:

$$P(e) \triangleq \frac{1}{M} \sum_{x} \mathbb{P} (X \neq \widehat{X}|X)$$

where M is the size of signal constellation.

The pairwise error probability $P(X \to \widehat{X})$ is defined as the probability that, when $X$ is transmitted, $\widehat{X}$ is received.

$P(e|X)$ can be expressed as the probability that at least one $\widehat{X} \neq X$ is closer than $X$ to $Y$.

Using the upper bound to the probability of a union of events, it can be written:

$$P(e|X)\le\sum_{\widehat{X}\neq X} P(X \to \widehat{X})$$

Finally:

$$P(e) = \tfrac{1}{M} \sum_{X \in S} P(e|X) \leq \tfrac{1}{M} \sum_{X \in S}\sum_{\widehat{X}\neq X} P(X \to \widehat{X})$$

== Closed form computation ==
For the simple case of the additive white Gaussian noise (AWGN) channel:

$$Y = X + Z, Z_i \sim \mathcal{N}(0,\tfrac{N_0}{2} I_n)
\,\!$$

The PEP can be computed in closed form as follows:

$$\begin{align}
P(X \to \widehat{X}) & = \mathbb{P}(||Y-\widehat{X}||^2 <||Y-X||^2|X) \\
& = \mathbb{P}(||(X+Z)-\widehat{X}||^2 <||(X+Z)-X||^2) \\
& = \mathbb{P}(||(X - \widehat{X})+Z||^2 <||Z||^2) \\
& = \mathbb{P}(||X- \widehat{X}||^2 +||Z||^2 +2(Z,X-\widehat{X})<||Z||^2) \\
& = \mathbb{P}(2(Z,X-\widehat{X})<-||X- \widehat{X}||^2)\\
& = \mathbb{P}((Z,X-\widehat{X})<-||X- \widehat{X}||^2/2)
\end{align}$$

$(Z,X-\widehat{X})$ is a Gaussian random variable with mean 0 and variance $N_0||X- \widehat{X}||^2/2$.

For a zero mean, variance $\sigma^2=1$ Gaussian random variable:

$$P(X > x) = Q(x) = \frac{1}{\sqrt{2\pi}} \int_{x}^{+\infty} e^-\tfrac{t^2}{2}dt$$

Hence,

$$\begin{align}
P(X \to \widehat{X}) & =Q \bigg(\tfrac{\tfrac{||X- \widehat{X}||^2}{2}}{\sqrt{\tfrac{N_0||X- \widehat{X}||^2}{2}}}\bigg)= Q \bigg(\tfrac{||X- \widehat{X}||^2}{2}.\sqrt{\tfrac{2}{N_0||X- \widehat{X}||^2}}\bigg) \\
& = Q \bigg(\tfrac{||X- \widehat{X}||}{\sqrt{2N_0}}\bigg)
\end{align}$$

== See also ==
- Signal processing
- Telecommunication
- Electrical engineering
- Random variable
