= Jeffrey Lieberman =

American psychiatrist (born 1948)

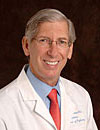
- Born: 1948 (age 77–78)
- Education: Miami University (BS); George Washington University (MD)
- Known for: Schizophrenia research NIMH CATIE study
- Children: 2
- Awards: Lieber Prize for Schizophrenia Research from the National Association for Research in Schizophrenia and Affective Disorders; Adolph Meyer Award from the American Psychiatric Association; Research Award from the National Alliance on Mental Illness
- Scientific career
- Fields: Psychiatry
- Workplaces: American Psychiatric Association; Columbia University Vagelos College of Physicians and Surgeons; New York State Psychiatric Institute; University of North Carolina School of Medicine; Mount Sinai School of Medicine; Albert Einstein College of Medicine; Zucker Hillside Hospital

Jeffrey Alan Lieberman (born 1948) is an American psychiatrist who specializes in schizophrenia and related psychoses and their associated neuroscience (biology) and pharmacological treatment (psychiatric drugs). He was principal investigator for CATIE, the largest and longest independent study ever funded by the United States National Institute of Mental Health to examine existing pharmacotherapies for schizophrenia. He was president of the American Psychiatric Association from May 2013 to May 2014.

== Education ==
Lieberman graduated from Miami University in 1970, and then received his medical degree from the George Washington School of Medicine in 1975. He completed his medical residency in psychiatry at St. Vincent's Hospital and Medical Center of New York Medical College.

== Career ==
=== Positions held ===
Lieberman is the Lawrence E. Kolb Professor of Psychiatry at the Columbia University Vagelos College of Physicians and Surgeons, where he directs the Lieber Center for Schizophrenia Research in the Department of Psychiatry at Columbia. He is a member of the National Academy of Sciences and was president of the American Psychiatric Association from 2013 to 2014. From 2005 to 2022, Lieberman was Chair of the Department of Psychiatry at the Columbia University Vagelos College of Physicians and Surgeons and the psychiatrist-in-chief of New York-Presbyterian Hospital/Columbia University Irving Medical Center.

Lieberman is or has been a member of the advisory committee for Neuropharmacologic and Psychopharmacologic Drugs of the Food and Drug Administration, the Planning Board for the Surgeon General's Report on Mental Health, the Committee on Research on Psychiatric Treatments of the APA, the APA Work Group for the Development of Schizophrenia Treatment Guidelines, the Brain Disorders and Clinical Neuroscience Review Committee, the National Advisory Mental Health Council of the NIMH, and currently chairs the APA Council of Research.

=== Research ===
Lieberman's research has focused on the neurobiology, pharmacology and treatment of schizophrenia and related psychotic disorders. His work has focused on understanding the natural history and pathophysiology of schizophrenia and the pharmacology and clinical effectiveness of antipsychotic drugs.

His research has been supported by grants from the National Institutes of Health and the NARSAD, Stanley, and Mental Illness Foundations.

==== CATIE study ====
Lieberman served as principal investigator for Clinical Antipsychotic Trials of Intervention Effectiveness (CATIE) sponsored by the National Institute of Mental Health (NIMH). The investigators compared a "first-generation antipsychotic, perphenazine, with several newer drugs in a double-blind study". "Probably the biggest surprise of all was that the older medication produced about as good an effect as the newer medications, three of them anyway, and did not produce neurological side effects at greater rates than any of the other drugs," Lieberman told The New York Times.

=== Journals edited ===
Lieberman serves, or has served, as associate editor of the American Journal of Psychiatry, Biological Psychiatry, Neuropsychopharmacology, Acta Psychiatrica Scandinavica, Schizophrenia Research, NeuroImage, The International Journal of Neuropsychopharmacology, and Schizophrenia Bulletin.

=== Twitter controversy ===
On February 21, 2022, Lieberman posted on Twitter about Nyakim Gatwech, an Ethiopian-born American model of South Sudanese descent, stating that "Whether a work of art or freak of nature she's a beautiful sight to behold", leading to criticism from students and colleagues. Following the backlash, Lieberman apologized, saying that the content of his post had been racist and sexist and that he was "deeply ashamed" of his “prejudices and stereotypical assumptions”. He subsequently deleted his Twitter account. The New York State Office of Mental Health (OMH) asked for his resignation as Director of the New York State Psychiatric Institute, and as of February 22, 2022, Lieberman was no longer affiliated with OMH or the State of New York. Lieberman was suspended as Chair of the Department of Psychiatry at Columbia University and removed from his position as Psychiatrist-in-Chief at NewYork-Presbyterian/Columbia University Irving Medical Center (NYP/CUIMC) on February 23, 2022.

Psychiatrist Bandy X. Lee who worked with Lieberman described his Twitter post as part of a pattern of racist and sexist behavior. Elwood Watson, a professor at East Tennessee State University, said the post fit within a centuries-long history of the dehumanization of people of African descent. Lieberman's colleague Carl Hart wrote that racism and sexism need to be better defined as grounds for disciplinary action and that he was uncertain whether Lieberman was racist given his apologies afterwards. In a New York Times op-ed, Columbia professor John McWhorter wrote: "It is unjust that someone’s life — and life’s work — be derailed because of a graceless way of putting something in an isolated instance."

== Publications ==
Lieberman has published over 500 research papers and edited or written ten books, including the textbook Psychiatry (currently in its second edition), Textbook of Schizophrenia, Comprehensive Care of Schizophrenia, Psychiatric Drugs and Ethics in Psychiatric Research: A Resource Manual on Human Subjects Protection.

In 2015, he published the book Shrinks: the Untold Story of Psychiatry (Little Brown). A four-part series, tentatively titled "In Search of Madness: The Untold Story of Mental Illness," based on his book, Shrinks, is scheduled for broadcast on PBS in April 2022.

A new book by Lieberman on schizophrenia was published by Scribner in 2023.

== Awards and honors ==
Lieberman is a member of the National Academy of Sciences Institute of Medicine and a fellow of the American Association for the Advancement of Science (AAAS). He received the Lieber Prize for Schizophrenia Research from NARSAD, the Adolph Meyer Award from the American Psychiatric Association (APA), the Stanley R. Dean Award for Schizophrenia Research from the American College of Psychiatrists, the APA Research Award, the APA Kempf Award for Research in Psychobiology, the APA Gralnick Award for Schizophrenia Research, the Ziskind-Somerfeld Award of the Society of Biological Psychiatry, the Ernest Strecker Award of the University of Pennsylvania, the Lilly Neuroscience Award from the Collegium Internationale Neuro-Psychopharmacologicum for Clinical Research, the Scientific Research Award, the Exemplary Psychiatrist Award from the National Alliance on Mental Illness, the Ed Hornick Memorial Award of The New York Academy of Medicine, and the Strecker Award of the Department of Psychiatry at the University of Pennsylvania.

== Reception ==
In 2015, in response to journalist Robert Whitaker's view that psychiatry suffers from a conflict of interest with pharmaceutical companies, Lieberman described Whitaker as a "menace to society".

A review of Lieberman's 2015 book Shrinks in The Guardian criticized the book for focusing almost entirely on American psychiatry, for its "triumphalist" narrative, and for failing to discuss Lieberman's financial relationship with pharmaceutical companies.

During the presidency of Donald Trump, Lieberman cited the American Psychiatric Association's Goldwater rule, which forbids psychiatrists from diagnosing public figures without having personally assessed them, as grounds to criticize a book edited by psychiatrist Bandy X. Lee that argued that Trump's mental condition made him dangerous. Lieberman also published his and seven colleagues' analysis of the president's mental state based on public information; they ruled out a series of diagnoses as unlikely and said incipient dementia was "most plausible", but concluded that Trump would have to allow for a full medical examination for any conclusions to be drawn. Lee argued that Lieberman was hypocritical for condemning her book but publishing his own analysis. Joshua Kendall also criticized Lieberman's stance and said it was inconsistent with Lieberman having written his Vice article.

== Personal life ==
Lieberman resides in New York City with his wife, Rosemarie, and two sons.
