= Kay O'Halloran =

Australian-born academic (born 1958)

- Born: 1958 (age 67–68)

Academic background
- Education: Murdoch University (PhD)

Academic work
- Sub-discipline: Multimodal discourse analysis
- Institutions: University of Liverpool

Kay L. O'Halloran (born 1958) is an Australian-born academic in the field of multimodal discourse analysis. She is Chair Professor and Head of Department of Communication and Media in the School of the Arts at the University of Liverpool and Visiting Distinguished Professor at Shanghai Jiaotong University (2017–2020). She is the founding director of the Multimodal Analysis Laboratory of the Interactive and Digital Media Institute (IDMI) at the National University of Singapore (NUS). She is widely known for her development of systemic functional multimodal discourse analysis (SF-MDA) and its application in the realm of mathematical discourse and multimodal text construction. Her current work involves the development and use of digital tools and techniques for multimodal analysis and mixed methods approaches to big data analytics.

== Biography ==
O'Halloran was born in 1958. Her early teaching career in mathematics led her to pursue a more sophisticated model of discourse analysis for the discipline of mathematics. This she found in the systemic functional linguistics of M.A.K. Halliday. She received her PhD at Murdoch University, Perth, Western Australia in 1996, and then held a postdoctoral position at Martin Luther University in Halle (Saale), Germany from 1997 to 1998. Following her move to the National University of Singapore in 1998, where she initially worked in the Department of the English Language & Literature, she established (2007) and directed the Multimodal Analysis Lab in the Interactive & Digital Media Institute, and from 2012 to 2013, she was the Deputy Director of Interactive & Digital Media Institute.

O'Halloran returned to Australia in 2013 to take up a professorship at Curtin University (2013 to 2019).

Her research involves the study of the integration of language, images and other resources (e.g. gesture, movement, 3D objects and space) in texts, interactions and events, and her current work involves the development and use of digital tools and techniques for multimodal analysis and mixed methods approaches to big data analytics.

== Contributions to SF-MDA ==
O'Halloran's major contribution to scholarship is in the realm of multimodal discourse analysis. She is internationally known for developing systemic functional multimodal discourse analysis (SF-MDA) approaches to mathematical discourse and multimodal texts (O'Toole 2012). Her research in multimodal approaches to mathematics is having a major impact in education (see e.g. Moschkovich (2010) Language and Mathematics Education: Multiple Perspectives and Directions for Research). Her 2005 monograph, Mathematical Discourse, has received high praise. It is cited by Leung (2007) as "a scholarly and important addition to the growing body of analysis in mathematics education research, mostly in the last two decades, around the cultural, social, and political dimensions of mathematics and its education” (p. 634). Haser et al. (2010: 151) describe how Mathematical Discourse opens up a “vast scope for further research”. O'Halloran has also been instrumental in supporting other researchers in publishing research in mulitmodality. She is the founding editor of the Routledge Studies in Multimodality research book series which has published more than 32 books.

It was during her early work in her PhD, involving the multimodal analysis of classroom discourse and board texts in secondary school mathematics classrooms differentiated on the basis of social class and gender, that O'Halloran realised the value of computer programming for multimodal transcription and analysis. Her first software program for SFL analysis (published in 2002 on CD-ROM) was developed with the assistance of another mathematician, Kevin Judd (University of Western Australia). Following on from this and through her work with the Multimodal Analysis Lab, Kay O'Halloran founded a spin-off company, Multimodal Analysis Company, and produced the commercial software applications, Multimodal Analysis Image (2012) and Multimodal Analysis Video (2013). The software is being used for teaching and research in Australia, Singapore, Malaysia, China, Japan, Hong Kong, USA, United Kingdom, Brazil, Finland, Greece, Germany, Sweden and South Africa.

== Select publications ==
- Sindoni, M. G., & Wildfeuer, J. & O'Halloran, K. L. (eds) (2017). Mapping Multimodal Performance Studies. New York & London: Routledge.
- Jewitt, C., Bezemer, J. & O'Halloran, K. L. (2016). Introducing Multimodality. London: Routledge.
- Tan, S., E, Marissa K. L., & O'Halloran, K. L. (2012). Multimodal Analysis Image (Teacher Edition and Student Edition). Singapore: Multimodal Analysis Company.
- O'Halloran, K. L. & Smith, B. A. (eds) (2011). Multimodal Studies: Exploring Issues and Domains. New York & London: Routledge.
- O'Halloran, K. L. (2005). Mathematical Discourse: Language, Symbolism and Visual Images. London and New York: Continuum. (reprinted 2008).
- O'Halloran, K. L. (ed) (2004). Multimodal Discourse Analysis. London and New York: Continuum. (reprinted 2006).
