= Ben O'Loughlin =

British academic

- Born: Newcastle-upon-Tyne, England
- Education: New College, Oxford
- Known for: International political communication, international relations, propaganda, public diplomacy, strategic communication, communication theory, terrorism

Ben O'Loughlin is professor of international relations at Royal Holloway, University of London. He is director of the New Political Communication Unit, which was launched in 2007. Before joining Royal Holloway in September 2006 he was a researcher on the ESRC New Security Challenges Programme. He completed a DPhil in Politics at New College, Oxford in 2005 under the supervision of the political theorist Elizabeth Frazer and journalist Godfrey Hodgson.

In 2019, O'Loughlin became Thinker in Residence at the Royal Flemish Academy of Belgium for Science and the Arts, on the topic of Democracy and Disinformation. In 2019, O'Loughlin published a report on Democracy and Disinformation with co-author Anja Bechmann.

== Research and expertise ==
O'Loughlin's expertise is in the field of international political communication. He was Specialist Advisor to the House of Lords Select Committee on Soft Power which published the report Power and Persuasion in the Modern World. The report drew extensively on O'Loughlin's work on strategic narrative.

The concept 'strategic narrative' has been developed by O'Loughlin with colleagues Alister Miskimmon at Royal Holloway, Andreas Antoniades (Sussex) and Laura Roselle at Elon University. Strategic narratives refer to how political agents tell stories about international affairs in order to influence the behaviour of states and non-state actors. O'Loughlin and colleagues' book on strategic narratives, Strategic Narratives: Communication Power and the New World Order, was published by Routledge in New York in November 2013, and won Best Book Award for International Communication at the 2016 International Studies Association convention. Together with Miskimmon and Roselle, in 2017, O'Loughlin published an edited volume of strategic narrative studies Forging the World: Strategic Narratives and International Relations with University of Michigan Press. From 2015 to 2018 he was funded by the Jean Monnet and the British Council to research the impact of culture and narratives on conflicts in Ukraine, Egypt and Israel-Palestine. This led to further Jean Monnet funding in 2019–20 to explore young people's political narratives in Ukraine and the Baltic states.

Through a number of projects, books and articles he has explored how politics and security are changing in the new media ecology. This work is drawn together in the book War and Media: The Emergence of Diffused War (Cambridge: Polity, 2010), co-authored with Andrew Hoskins. He has published articles in Political Studies, Review of International Studies, International Affairs, Journal of Common Market Studies, New Media & Society, International Journal of Press/Politics, Journalism, Journal of Communication, Journal of Computer-Mediated Communication and many other peer-reviewed scientific journals.

He has carried out projects on media and radicalisation for the Economic and Social Research Council and the Centre for the Protection of National Infrastructure. This led to the book Radicalisation and Media: Terrorism and Connectivity in the New Media Ecology (London: Routledge, 2011) co-authored with Akil N. Awan and Andrew Hoskins.

O'Loughlin has carried extensive research in the new field of social media monitoring. In 2016 his study of dual-screening during televised leaders debates - how audiences interact on social media while watching a debate on TV - won the Best Article of the Year Award at APSA, the American Political Science Association (co-authored with Andrew Chadwick and Cristian Vaccari). In 2016 he also conducted research with Marie Gillespie for the British Council evaluating how global audiences engage with the #ShakespeareLives campaign to mark the 400th anniversary of William Shakespeare's birth. Previously, he and Gillespie completing a project examining how the BBC used social media to engage global audiences during the London 2012 Summer Olympics and published a set of papers comparing how audiences engaged with BBC and Russia Today across the 2012 Summer Olympics and 2014 Winter Olympics in Sochi. In 2010 he completed a project for the UK Technology Strategy Board exploring how Twitter data can reveal emerging crises, infrastructure problems, and shifts in public opinion. With Nick Anstead he calls this Semantic Polling.

O'Loughlin is co-editor of the Sage journal Media, War & Conflict. The journal was launched in 2008. It is a major international, peer-reviewed journal that maps the shifting arena of war, conflict and terrorism in an intensively and extensively mediated age.

O'Loughlin has presented research to the No. 10 Policy Unit, Home Office, Foreign and Commonwealth Office, OFCOM, NATO, the European Commission and European Broadcasting Union (EBU), as well as expert groups like the Global Futures Forum. He has contributed to The New York Times, The Washington Post, The Guardian, OpenDemocracy, Sky News, Huffington Post and Newsweek. He has held visiting positions at the University of Canterbury, the Institute for Advances Studies at the University of Bologna, at Nanyang Technological University, Singapore, and at the University of Sydney, Australia. He blogs for Global Policy, the international relations journal, and the New Political Communication Unit.
