= International Journal of Public Health =

- Discipline: Public health
- Language: English

Publication details
- Former name(s): Sozial- und Präventivmedizin
- History: 1955–present
- Publisher: Frontiers Media
- Impact factor: 5.1 (2021)

Standard abbreviations
- ISO 4: Int. J. Public Health

Indexing
- ISSN: 1661-8556 (print); 1661-8564 (web)

The International Journal of Public Health, formerly known as Sozial- und Präventivmedizin (1955–2007) is the peer-reviewed academic journal of the Swiss School of Public Health.

In 2021, Springer Science+Business Media announced the move of this journal to a new publisher, Frontiers Media.

In 2023, the French Conférence des Doyens des Facultés de Médecine and Conseil national des universités pour les disciplines de santé listed it as one of about 3,400 "recommendable" journals for publishing research about medicine, health and biology. The publication of the list is part of an effort to help researchers identify reputable medical journals.
