= John Gartner (psychologist) =

American psychologist

John D. Gartner is an American psychologist, psychotherapist, author, activist, and former part-time assistant professor at Johns Hopkins University Medical School.

== Education ==
Gartner graduated magna cum laude from Princeton University. He received a PhD in clinical psychology from the University of Massachusetts Amherst, and then completed his post-doctoral training at Weill Medical College of Cornell University.

== Career ==
Gartner is a psychotherapist with private practices in Baltimore and Manhattan, where he specialized in the treatment of borderline personality disorder, bipolar disorder and depression. He was a part-time professor, until 2015, for 28 years at Johns Hopkins University Medical School, and is a widely published author of books, and of articles for scientific and other journals.

== Activism ==
Gartner has described himself as a member of "The Resistance" against Donald Trump, stating:

"I went through a similar process like some of the other people you have spoken to who have decided to step away from being active members of 'the resistance.' For five years I did that work with total energy and commitment. I was sounding the alarm about Trump basically every day. I did hundreds of interviews. I made it my full-time job like I was at war. But after five years, when Biden was inaugurated, I thought, okay, the war's over, I can take off my metaphorical uniform."

Gartner has described Trump as "an animal" who is "convinced that he actually believes that he has some type of God-like powers". Gartner has described Trump as "unwell, dangerously unfit, malignant personality who has reaped massive destruction", who is "hypomanic", "showing gross signs of dementia", and other mental illness and personality disorders.

=== 2017 mental fitness for Office of President Trump petition ===
In the first months of 2017, Gartner collected the signatures of more than 41,000 mental health professionals. The petition, "Mental Health Professionals Declare Trump is Mentally Ill And Must Be Removed", was sent to the Minority leader, Senator Chuck Schumer of New York. At the end of April 2017, Gartner sent the petition to Washington D.C., with more than 41,000 signatures.

According to Gartner, Trump's mental handicaps are a mixture of narcissism, paranoia, sociopathy and a measure of sadism. The petition's declaration stated:

"We, the undersigned mental health professionals (please state your degree), believe in our professional judgment that Donald Trump manifests a serious mental illness that renders him psychologically incapable of competently discharging the duties of President of the United States. And we respectfully request he be removed from office, according to article 4 of the 25th amendment to the Constitution, which states that the president will be replaced if he is “unable to discharge the powers and duties of his office."

=== Duty to Warn ===
In 2017, Gartner founded Duty to Warn, an organization of mental health professionals and laypersons who consider it their duty to warn patients, clients, and the community-at-large, when aware of potential danger.

=== 2024 petition regarding Trump's cognitive fitness for office ===
In 2024, Gartner launched a petition on change.org titled We diagnose Trump with probable dementia: A petition for licensed professionals only. The petition was intended to raise concerns among mental health professionals about former President Donald Trump's cognitive fitness to serve a second term, should he be re-elected in the 2024 United States presidential election.

Gartner, along with psychologist Harry Segal, also co-hosted a weekly podcast for 70 episodes from late 2023, titled Shrinking Trump, in which they and guest experts discussed Trump's psychological profile, focusing on topics such as his observed cognitive decline and narcissistic traits. Presenting various cases of the authoritarian vindictiveness and persecution of other media and academics by the US government, and declaring their own low risk tolerance as current US citizens, the two hosts decided to stop the Shrinking Trump podcast series in October 2025, with Gartner expressing his hope that they had made their case to the public. A follow-up show with different hosts and name was tentatively announced.

== Bibliography ==
Gartner is the author of numerous scholarly articles and several books, including:

- The Hypomanic Edge (2005), in which he argues that many American leaders could be diagnosed as "hypomanic"
- In Search of Bill Clinton (2008), which claimed Bill Clinton showed manic tendencies
- Rocket Man: Nuclear Madness and the Mind of Donald Trump
- The Dangerous Case of Donald Trump: 27 Psychiatrists and Mental Health Experts Assess a President (2017), contributor
