= Psychoanalytic Electronic Publishing =

- Status: active
- Founded: 1996
- Country of origin: United States
- Official website: https://pep-web.org

Psychoanalytic Electronic Publishing (PEP) is an academic publisher of psychoanalysis research. Established in 1996, it has published articles from over 37 academic journals and several books dating back to 1871. A paper on American Imago described it as the "largest psycho-analytical literature database".

The organization was formed with financial support from the American Psychoanalytic Association and the Institute of Psychoanalysis. It has published academic works on CD-ROMs and in its online archive.
