= Goldwater (disambiguation) =

Barry Goldwater (1909–1998) was an American conservative politician.

Goldwater may also refer to:

- Goldwater (surname), including a list of people with the name
- Barry Goldwater High School located in Phoenix, Arizona
- Goldwater Institute, a Phoenix, Arizona-based think tank named for Barry Goldwater
- Goldwater Lake, a reservoir on Bannon Creek in North Central Arizona
- Goldwater rule, a psychiatric ethics principle, named for Barry Goldwater
- Goldwater's, American department store owned by Michel Goldwasser, grandfather of Barry Goldwater
- The Goldwaters, a folk group named for Barry Goldwater

== See also ==
- Goldwasser (surname), the original surname of the Barry Goldwater family, prior to anglicisation by an ancestor at some point in the 19th century
- Goldwasser, liqueur containing specks of gold
