= Goldwater v. Ginzburg =

1969 United States court case ruling on defamation

Goldwater v. Ginzburg was a 1969 United States court ruling on defamation.

== Background ==
Fact Magazine (Fact) was a corporation in New York. The defendant, Ralph Ginzburg, was the editor and publisher of Fact, and Warren Boroson, a co-defendant in this case, was the managing editor of Fact. The plaintiff, Barry Goldwater, was a United States Senator from Arizona and had been a 1964 presidential candidate. The defendants testified that they attended the July 1964 Republican National Convention and were not impressed with Senator Goldwater. Thus, they decided to warn the American people in an issue of their magazine (soon known as the "Goldwater issue" of Fact) immediately after Goldwater's nomination on July 16.

The issue at hand was the article published by Fact titled "The Unconscious of a Conservative: A Special Issue on the Mind of Barry Goldwater" in the September–October 1964 issue. The magazine polled psychiatrists and asked if Goldwater was psychologically fit to serve as president. Fact used the information given from the polls in the magazine article against Goldwater, who subsequently sued Fact Magazine, Inc., Ginzburg, and Boroson for "false, scandalous and defamatory statements referring to and concerning [the] plaintiff."

Over 1,800 psychiatrists responded to the polls sent by Ginzburg. Although the responses were presented as the "professional opinions" of the psychiatrists, Walter Earl Barton, the medical director of the American Psychiatric Association, sent Fact a letter of protest that argued a valid professional opinion required "the traditional (and confidential) doctor-patient relationship in which findings are based upon a thorough clinical examination" and warned that in the event the survey was published, the APA would "take all possible measures to disavow its validity". The APA ultimately issued the Goldwater rule in 1973, reaffirming medical privacy and forbidding member psychiatrists from diagnosing public figures that the psychiatrist has not personally examined and without a person's consent.

== Court rulings ==
The court found that the evidence introduced at trial proved the defendants knew they were publishing defamatory statements and "were motivated by actual malice when they published the statements." The court found the defendants had libeled Senator Goldwater based on the article Fact published. The plaintiff demanded $1,000,000 in compensatory and punitive damages but Senator Goldwater was awarded $1 in compensatory damages and $75,000 in punitive damages. The compensatory damages were against all defendants but the punitive damages were split between the defendants. Ginzburg and Boroson were liable for $25,000 of the $75,000 and Fact Magazine, Inc. was liable for $50,000. The United States Court of Appeals affirmed the award and the Supreme Court denied a petition for certiorari (review); Justice Black and Justice Douglas joined a dissenting opinion, rather unusual at the time (1970) on orders denying "cert." Boroson was the only defendant not to file an appeal after receiving the ruling.
