= Goldwasser (surname) =

Goldwasser is a Jewish surname. Notable people with the surname include:

- Ben Goldwasser, American musician, MGMT
- Carol Goldwasser, American casting director
- Ehud Goldwasser, Israeli soldier
- Eugene Goldwasser, biochemist
- I. Edwin Goldwasser, American teacher, philanthropist, and businessman
- Joseph Goldwasser, Polish-born American businessman
- Ned Goldwasser, American physicist
- Orly Goldwasser, professor of Egyptology
- Robin Goldwasser, American singer and playwright
- Shafi Goldwasser, Israeli-American computer scientist

== See also ==
- Goldwater
