= 9999th Air Reserve Squadron =

- Active: 1961-?
- Country: United States
- Branch: United States Air Force

Commanders
- Notable commanders: Major General Barry Goldwater

The 9999th Air Reserve Squadron is an inactive United States Air Force Reserve squadron in Washington, D.C. It often consisted of many high-ranking officers and air force reservists who were also serving in the United States Congress. Senator Barry Goldwater as a major general in the reserves once commanded the unit.

== History ==
The unit was formed in January 1961. In 1965, the unit had 54 members of the House of Representatives and the Senate and their staffs. The unit met for duty at the Senate Office Building.
