= The Goldwaters =

American folk music group

The Goldwaters were a short-lived American folk music group from the 1960s who wrote and sang songs praising then—Arizona senator Barry Goldwater and his libertarian philosophies. The band formed primarily to boost support for Goldwater's 1964 presidential campaign and were best known for their politically conservative comedic banter and bright red sweaters which were emblazoned with the combined formulas for gold and water (Au H_{2}O). Neither Goldwater nor his campaign had anything to do with creating the group. The group released one album, The Goldwaters Sing Folk Songs to Bug the Liberals, in 1964, which has since become a novelty collector's item.

== Members ==
- Ken Crook – (Singer)
- Bob Green – (Guitarist)
- Fred Quan – (Banjo)
- Jim Vantrease – Bassist (did not tour with the group)

== Related links ==
- Bob Roberts (the 1992 movie)
