= Fact (American magazine) =

American magazine (1964–1967)

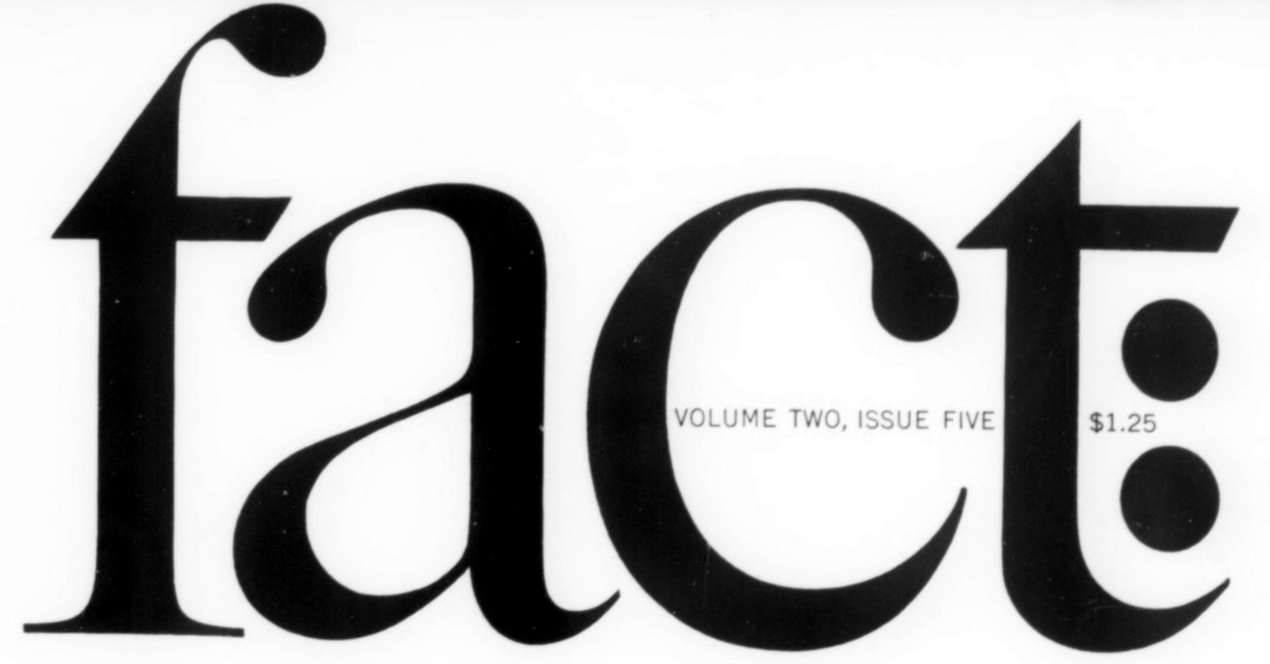

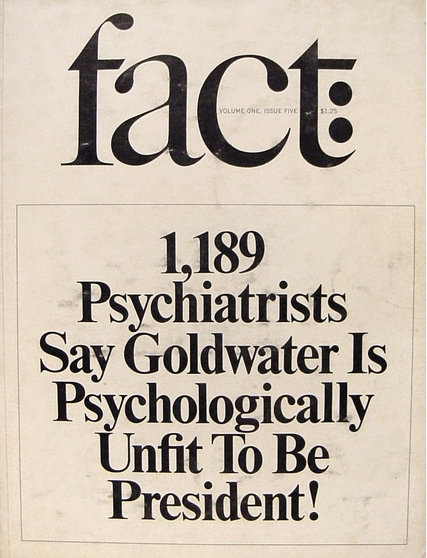
- Cover of the September-October 1964 issue
- Editor: Ralph Ginzburg
- Frequency: Quarterly
- Publisher: Trident Press
- Founded: 1964
- First issue: January 1964
- Final issue: August 1967
- Country: US
- Based in: New York City
- Language: English
- ISSN: 0429-9825
- OCLC: 1568723

Fact, stylized fact:, was an American quarterly magazine that commented on controversial topics. It was in circulation between January 1964 and August 1967.

== History ==
Established in January 1964, the publisher of Fact was Trident Press based in New York City. The magazine was edited by Ralph Ginzburg and Warren Boroson and designed by Herb Lubalin. Ginzburg was known for having previously published the magazine Eros. Due to the content of that magazine, Ginzburg was sentenced to prison on obscenity charges. It described itself as a "bimonthly of uncompromising truth". One of the editors of fact: was Robert Anton Wilson, a prolific science fiction author whose works include the Illuminatus! series.

In its first issue, it contained a lengthy criticism of Time magazine, including 25 pages of letters from people claiming to have been hurt by its coverage. This issue also included an interview from Ginzburg with neo-Nazi George Lincoln Rockwell, titled "The Man Who Thinks Goldwater is a Communist". Another article in the issue discussed the sexual symbolism of the Christmas holiday.

Fact was notable for having been sued by Barry Goldwater over a 1964 issue entitled "The Unconscious of a Conservative: A special Issue on the Mind of Barry Goldwater". In Goldwater v. Ginzburg, a federal jury awarded Goldwater $1 in compensatory damages and $75,000 in punitive damages, to punish Ginzburg and the magazine for being reckless. The American Psychiatric Association then issued the Goldwater rule reaffirming medical privacy and forbidding commenting on a patient whom the individual psychiatrist has not personally examined.

The United States Court of Appeals for the Second Circuit affirmed the award and the Supreme Courts denied a petition for certiorari (review); Justice Black and Justice Douglas joined a dissenting opinion, rather unusual at the time (1970) on orders denying "cert."

The magazine ceased in August 1967.
