= Goldwater (surname) =

Goldwater is a Jewish surname. Notable people with the surname include:

- Anne-France Goldwater (born 1960), Canadian lawyer and hostess of TV's L'arbitre
- Barry Goldwater (1909–1998), American politician
- Barry Goldwater Jr. (born 1938), American politician, son of Barry
- John L. Goldwater (1916–1999), American comics editor and publisher
- Marilyn R. Goldwater (1927–2023), American politician
- Morris Goldwater (1852–1939), American politician, businessman, uncle of Barry
- Richard Goldwater (1936–2007), American comics publisher, son of John
- Robert Goldwater (1907–1973), American art historian
- Walter Goldwater (1907–1985), American antiquarian bookseller
