= Warren Boroson =

American author and journalist (1935–2023)

- Born: Warren Gilbert Boroson; January 22, 1935; Manhattan, New York, U.S.
- Died: March 12, 2023 (aged 88); Woodstock, New York, U.S.
- Education: Columbia University (BA)
- Occupations: Author; educator; journalist; editor
- Spouse: Rebecca Kaplan
- Children: 2

Warren Gilbert Boroson (January 22, 1935 – March 12, 2023) was an American author and journalist. He began his career in print journalism, and was best known as managing editor of Fact in 1964, when the magazine ran a controversial survey of psychiatrists on presidential candidate Barry Goldwater's mental fitness for office, which led to a lawsuit and revised ethical guidelines against psychiatric professionals diagnosing individuals they had not personally evaluated. He subsequently worked as an educator and writer of books about business and personal finance.

== Early life ==
Warren Boroson was born in Manhattan in 1935. He grew up on Boulevard East in West New York, New Jersey, where he attended P.S. No. 6 and graduated from Memorial High School in January 1952. He attended Columbia University, where he intended to pursue education, though he eventually majored in English and decided to pursue a career in journalism. He graduated in 1957.

== Career ==
In 1964, Boroson was managing editor of Fact Magazine, which was sued by Barry Goldwater for articles it published questioning Goldwater's psychological fitness to be president. Boroson has stated that David Bar-Illan was the creator of the article that helped lead to the lawsuit, even though his name was not listed originally. Goldwater sued him and the magazine for $2 million. A jury handed down a $75,000 judgment against the publisher and the magazine, though only $1 of the damages, split three ways, was personally paid by the defendants, including Boroson.

For the years 1990 and 2000, Boroson won the top business news-writing award from Rutgers/CIT. In 1996, he won the Investment Company Institute/American University personal finance writing award. In 2002 and 2004 he won the New Jersey Press Association's top business-writing award. He was formerly on staff at Money magazine and at Sylvia Porter's Personal Finance Magazine.

Boroson's career at the Daily Record of Morris County, New Jersey, ended rather abruptly in 2007. A new editor killed his nationally syndicated financial column, claiming that it was not local enough. (Boroson maintained that the new editor had told him that readers identify him with the newspaper—and "I knew then that my goose was cooked.") After his column was killed, Boroson resigned.

Boroson had articles published in the New York Times Magazine, Woman's Day, TV Guide, Better Homes and Gardens, Reader's Digest, Consumer Reports, Family Circle, and Cosmopolitan Magazine.

Boroson taught music courses at the Bard LLI, Marist, and SUNY. He also taught at the County College of Morris in Randolph, New Jersey, and at The New School, Fairleigh Dickinson University, Ramapo College, and Rutgers University.

In 2008, Boroson began teaching courses on famous singers of the past—Rosa Ponselle, Richard Crooks, Lotte Schoene, Conchita Supervia. In 2013, he was teaching music classes at Bard LLI.

Boroson won third place in the 2009 New Jersey Society of Professional Journalists contest for sports articles in a weekly, and first place for feature articles. He won a second and a third place in 2013.

== Personal life and death ==
Boroson was married to the former Rebecca Kaplan. They had two sons.

Boroson lived in Woodstock, New York. He died at his home on March 12, 2023, at the age of 88, from chronic obstructive pulmonary disease and various heart problems.

== Selected bibliography ==
- The Best of Fact. Trident Press, 1967. ASIN B0006BRBJG – with Ralph Ginzburg
- How to buy or sell your home in a changing market. Medical Economics Books, 1983. ISBN 0-87489-278-3
- Physicians' guide to professional and personal advisers. Medical Economics Books, 1985. ISBN 0-87489-355-0
- How to Sell Your House in a Buyer's Market. Wiley, 1990. ISBN 0-471-52508-1, with Martin M. Shenkman
- Save Thousands on Your Mortgage: The Best Investment You Can Make. MacMillan of Canada, 1990. ISBN 0-02-028345-8
- Mutual Fund Switch Strategies and Timing Tactics (The Investor's Self-Teaching Seminars). Probus Professional Publishing, 1991. ISBN 1-55738-184-4
- Keys to Investing for Your Child's Future. Barron's Educational Series, 1992. ISBN 0-8120-4961-6
- The Home Buyer's Inspection Guide : Everything You Need to Know to Save $$ and Get A Better House. Wiley, 1993. ISBN 0-471-57450-3, with Ken Austin.
- Keys to Retirement Planning. Barron's Educational Series, 2nd ed. 1995. ISBN 0-8120-9013-6
- Keys to Saving Money on Income Taxes. Barron's Educational Series, 2nd ed. 1995. ISBN 0-8120-9012-8
- The Ultimate Stock Picker's Guide: 24 Top Experts Recommend 25 Stocks to Buy & Hold. Probus Professional Publishing, 1995. ISBN 1-55738-823-7
- Keys to Investing in Mutual Funds. Barron's Educational Series, 3rd ed. 1997. ISBN 0-8120-9644-4
- The Ultimate Mutual Fund Guide: 19 Experts Pick the 33 Top Funds You Should Own. Irwin Professional Publishing, 1997. ISBN 0-7863-1130-4
- Keys to Investing in Your 401K. Barron's Educational Series, 2000. ISBN 0-7641-1298-8
- How to Buy a House with No (or Little) Money Down, 3rd Edition Wiley, 2001. ISBN 0-471-39731-8, with Martin M. Shenkman
- J. K. Lasser's Pick Stocks Like Warren Buffett. Wiley, 2001. ISBN 0-471-39774-1
- The Reverse Mortgage Advantage : The Tax-Free, House Rich Way to Retire Wealthy! McGraw-Hill, 2006. ISBN 0-07-147072-7
