= Walter Earl Barton =

American physician (1906–1999)

Walter Earl Barton, M.D. (1906–1999) was an American physician, a psychiatric administrator, and a leader in American psychiatry.

Barton was born in Oak Park, Illinois and grew up in Elmshurst, Illinois where he attended the public schools. During high school he suffered a leg injury and infection playing football, which led to his interest in becoming a physician. In school, he played the trombone and edited the year book.

Barton attended college at the University of Illinois and upon graduation entered the University of Illinois College of Medicine. He earned his M.D. in 1931. He wrote his thesis on S. Weir Mitchell, a prominent neurologist and psychiatrist. He had planned to study obstetrics, but when he interned at the West Suburban Hospital in Oak Park, Illinois, he was persuaded to spend one year in psychiatry. He was recommended to practice at the Worcester State Mental Hospital in Massachusetts and he stayed there until 1942, first as a psychiatric resident then as assistant superintendent. The superintendent of the Worcester State Mental Hospital then was William Bryan, a physician who wrote the first book on psychiatric administration. Barton wrote his first publication in 1934 on pericardial hemorrhage in scurvy.

Barton began his military career in 1937, when he joined the Army National Guard. He also began teaching at the Smith College School of Social Work. In 1938, he spent a year at the National Hospital, Queens Square in London to study neurology, and then returned to Worcester State Mental Hospital to train as an administrator under Bryan. In 1942, his National Guard unit was mobilized but he was declared essential medical personnel and stayed at the hospital. Later that year, he worked at the Walter Reed Army Medical Hospital in Washington, DC (now Walter Reed National Military Medical Center in Bethesda, Maryland) then assigned to the Valley Forge General Hospital in Phoenixville, Pennsylvania, which was under construction. He complained about the construction of the psychiatric unit. His criticism of the rehabilitation activities in the U.S. Army led to his assignment in an occupational therapy unit of the Army and to develop rehabilitation programs for the blind and deaf. He also helped develop the Army's Reconditioning Program. His work in the army earned him the Legion of Merit Medal.

Barton wanted an overseas assignment and was sent to Leyte in the Philippines as a commanding officer of a station medical hospital. In 1945, he was soon brought back at the request of the Governor of Massachusetts to be superintendent of the Boston State Hospital. He left military service as a lieutenant colonel.

Barton found the Boston State Hospital in abominable conditions: there were only six physicians and 20 nurses to cover 2,600 patients. The buildings had been neglected and the patient care was inhumane. Barton's first task was to recruit physicians and nurses (his military experience enlarged his acquaintance with many qualified staff who he recruited for the hospital). He began training programs and research activities at the hospital.

In 1946, Barton began his service as a consultant to the Veterans Administration (VA) and the National Institute of Mental Health. Both organizations were building their programs in training and research, and becoming active in psychiatric organizations. He was appointed to the Joint Commission on Mental Health and Illness which was established by the U.S. Congress to consider the entire field of mental health disease and to recommend improvements in medical care. He worked with the commission for six years which produced the book, Action for Mental Health, a blueprint for psychiatry for the future in the United States.

Barton remained at the Boston State Hospital from 1945 to 1963, when he left to serve as Medical Director of the American Psychiatric Association (APA) from 1963 to 1974. He was elected President of the APA in 1961–1962. He was involved with many organizations: a director of the American Board of Psychiatry and Neurology from 1962 to 1970 (president, 1970); a member of the Residency Review Committee for Psychiatry and Neurology for the American Medical Association from 1966 to 1989, an Incorporator of the American College of Mental Health Administration in 1970, a member of the Massachusetts Council for Mental Health in 1929, a member of the Council of Medical Specialty Societies in 1929, and the Group for Advancement of Psychiatry (president, 1951).

In 1958, Barton secured a grant from the Commonwealth Fund (Massachusetts) which enabled a small group to visit psychiatric facilities in Western Europe to study programs for chronic psychiatric patients. Barton published their findings in 1961 in Impressions of European Psychiatry.

His career as a teacher began in 1931 as a lecturer to nurses, residents, and students at Worcester State Hospital. He taught at Clark University from 1940 to 1942, at Tufts Medical School between 1960 and 1963, Boston University School of Medicine between 1963 and 1989, and professor then professor emeritus at the Dartmouth Medical School from 1974 to 1989.

Barton participated actively in many community organizations including the Occupational Therapy Association (president, 1951), the Board of Directors of The Associated Charities of Worcester, the Worcester Child Guidance Clinic, the YMCA of Worcester, the Board of Christian Social Concerns of the Methodist Church in Washington, DC, the American Mental Hygiene Society, and the Vermont State Mental Health Board from 1986 to 1987.

He also received numerous honors: the Nolan D.C. Lewis Award in 1962, Salmon Medal of the New York Academy of Medicine in 1974, and an honorary D.Sc. from the University of Illinois Medical School. He was an Honorary Fellow of the Royal College of Psychiatry in London in 1972, a Fellow of the Australian and New Zealand College of Psychiatry in 1970, an honorary member of the Eastern Psychiatric Association, an honorary member of the American Academy of Child Psychiatry, and a corresponding member Indian Psychiatric Society.

His publications include fourteen books and approximately 200 journal articles.

Barton died in Vermont in 1999.

== Works ==
- Barton, Walter E. "Pericardial Hemorrhage Complicating Scurvy," New England Journal of Medicine 210 (March 1934): 529–531.
- Barton, Walter E. "Study of Sick Leave at Worcester State Hospital," Hospitals 15 (January 1941): 85–88.
- Barton, Walter E. "Rehabilitation of the Blind in Army Hospitals," Outlook for the Blind 37 (September 1943): 191–195.
- Barton, Walter E. "Rehabilitation Services to the Blind and Deaf," Journal of the American Medical Association (1943): 41.
- Barton, Walter E. "The Army Expands its Occupational Therapy Program," Occupational Therapy and Rehabilitation (1943): 247.
- Barton, Walter E. "So He's been Wounded," Red Cross Courier (1943-1944): 21.
- Barton, Walter E. "Progress Report on the Army's Program for Rehabilitation of the Deafened," Hearing News (1944): 6, 7-14.
- Barton, Walter E. "Healthy Attitudes toward War Injuries," Public Health Nursing (1944): 74–79.
- Barton, Walter E. "Reconditioning of Neuropsychiatric Patients," Bulletin of the Menninger Clinic (1944): 138–140.
- Barton, Walter E. "Training Program for Occupational Therapists in the US Army," Occupational Therapy and Rehabilitation (1944): 281–283.
- Barton, Walter E. "Do's and Don'ts in Military Occupational Therapy," Occupational Therapy and Rehabilitation (1944): 121–123.
- Barton, Walter E. "Reconditioning Program in Army Hospitals," Occupational Therapy and Rehabilitation (1944): 174–178.
- Barton, Walter E. "Present Status of Rehabilitation in the United States Army," Journal of the American Medical Association (1944): 256–258.
- Barton, Walter E. "The Reconditioning and Rehabilitating Program in Army Hospitals," American Journal of Psychiatry (1944-1945): 608–613.
- Barton, Walter E. "Convalescent Reconditioning Program for Neuropsychiatric Casualties in the U.S. Army," Proceedings of the Association for Research in Nervous and Mental Diseases (1946): 271–284.
- Barton, Walter E. Administration in Psychiatry. Springfield, IL: Thomas, 1962. Second edition with Gail M. Barton, 1983.
- Barton, Walter E., and Gail M. Barton. Ethics and Law in Mental Health Administration. New York: International Universities Press, 1984.
- Barton, Walter E. Presidential Papers, 1961-1962. Washington, DC: American Psychiatric Association, 1963.
- Barton, Walter E., et al. Impressions of European Psychiatry. Washington, DC: American Psychiatric Association, 1961.
- Barton, Walter E. Moments of Madness: Remembering Life in a State Hospital in the 1930s. Lebanon, NH: Whitman Communications, 1996.
- Barton, Walter E., and Gail M. Barton. Shrinking Time for Health Administrators. Pittsburgh, PA: Dorrance Publishing Co., 1999.
