= Barry Goldwater =

American politician and military officer (1909–1998)

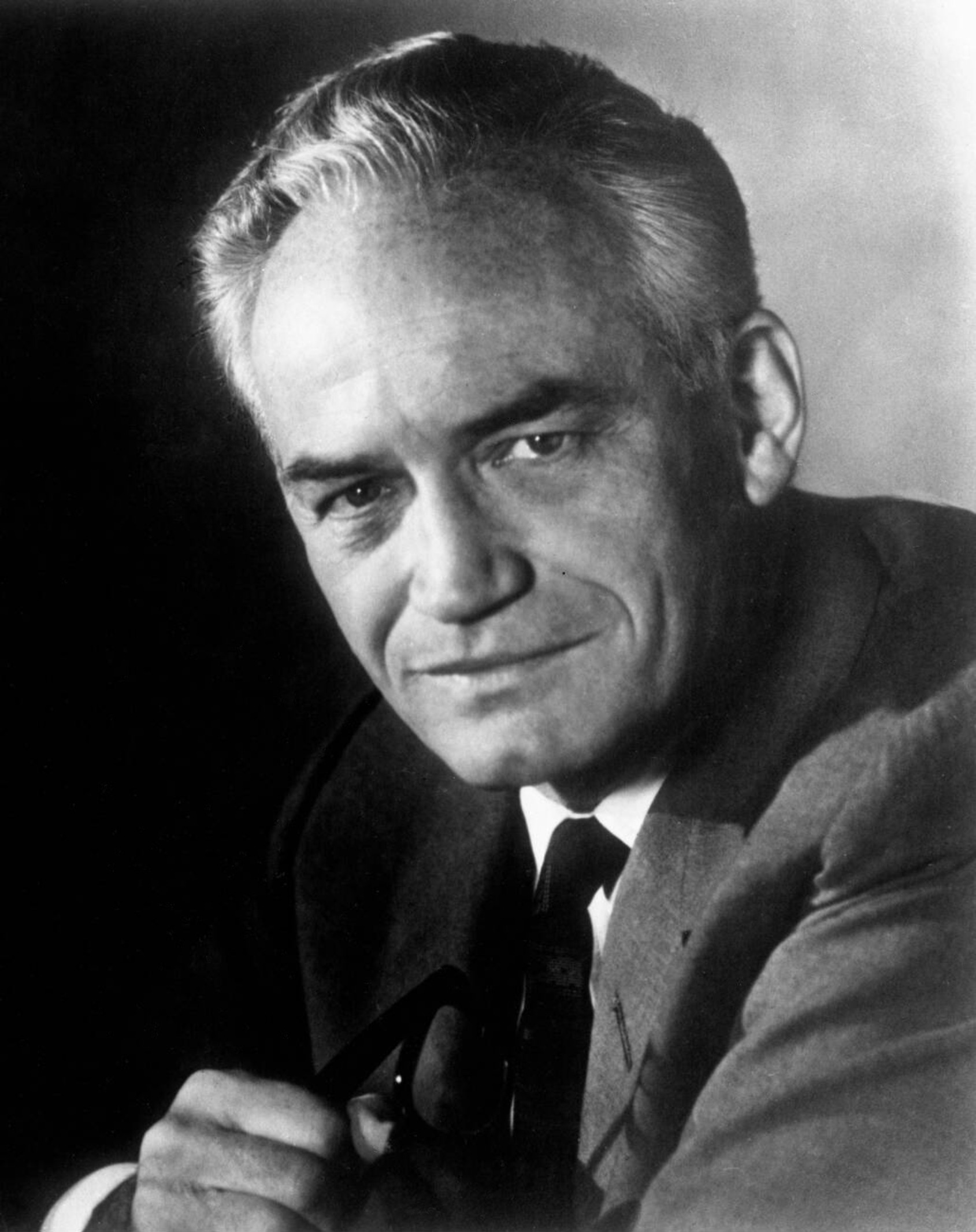
- Goldwater in 1960

United States Senator from Arizona
- In office January 3, 1969 – January 3, 1987
- Preceded by: Carl Hayden
- Succeeded by: John McCain
- In office January 3, 1953 – January 3, 1965
- Preceded by: Ernest McFarland
- Succeeded by: Paul Fannin
Senate positions
Chair of the Senate Armed Services Committee
In office January 3, 1985 – January 3, 1987
Preceded by	John Tower
Succeeded by	Sam Nunn
Chair of the Senate Intelligence Committee
In office January 3, 1981 – January 3, 1985
Preceded by	Birch Bayh
Succeeded by	David Durenberger
Ranking Member of the Senate Intelligence Committee
In office January 3, 1977 – January 3, 1981
Preceded by	Clifford P. Case
Succeeded by	Daniel Patrick Moynihan
Ranking Member of the Senate Labor Committee
In office January 3, 1959 – January 3, 1965
Preceded by	H. Alexander Smith
Succeeded by	Jacob Javits
Chair of the National Republican Senatorial Committee
In office January 3, 1955 – January 3, 1957
Preceded by	Everett Dirksen
Succeeded by	Everett Dirksen

Personal details
- Born: Barry Morris Goldwater; January 2, 1909 Phoenix, Arizona Territory
- Died: May 29, 1998 (aged 89) Paradise Valley, Arizona, U.S.
- Party: Republican
- Spouses: Margaret Johnson (m. 1934; died 1985); Susan Wechsler (m. 1992)
- Children: 4, including Barry Jr.
- Education: University of Arizona (attended)

Military service
- Branch/service: United States Army; Army Air Forces; Arizona Air National Guard; United States Air Force; Air Force Reserve
- Years of service: 1941–1946 (active); 1946–1967 (reserves)
- Rank: Major General
- Battles/wars: World War II; Second Sino-Japanese War; Korean War

Barry Morris Goldwater (January 2, 1909 – May 29, 1998) was an American politician and major general in the Air Force Reserve who served as a United States senator from Arizona from 1953 to 1965 and 1969 to 1987, and was the Republican nominee for president in the 1964 election.

Goldwater was born in Phoenix, Arizona, where he helped manage his family's department store. During World War II, he flew aircraft between the U.S. and India. After the war, Goldwater served in the Phoenix City Council. In 1952, he was elected to the U.S. Senate, where he rejected the legacy of the New Deal and, along with the conservative coalition, fought against the New Deal coalition. Goldwater also challenged his party's moderate to liberal wing on policy issues. He supported the Civil Rights Acts of 1957 and 1960 and the 24th Amendment to the U.S. Constitution but opposed the Civil Rights Act of 1964, disagreeing with Title II and Title VII. In the 1964 U.S. presidential election, Goldwater mobilized a large conservative constituency to win the Republican nomination, but then lost the general election to incumbent Democratic president Lyndon B. Johnson in a landslide.

Goldwater returned to the Senate in 1969 and specialized in defense and foreign policy. Along with representatives John Jacob Rhodes and Hugh Scott, he successfully urged president Richard Nixon to resign in 1974 when evidence of a cover-up in the Watergate scandal became overwhelming and impeachment was imminent. In 1986, he oversaw passage of the Goldwater–Nichols Act, which strengthened civilian authority in the U.S. Department of Defense. Near the end of his career, Goldwater's views on social and cultural issues grew increasingly libertarian.

Many political pundits and historians believe he laid the foundation for the conservative revolution to follow as the grassroots organization and conservative takeover of the Republican Party began a long-term realignment in American politics, which helped to bring about the presidency of Ronald Reagan in the 1980s. He also had a substantial impact on the American libertarian movement. After leaving the Senate, Goldwater became supportive of environmental protection, gay rights, including military service and adoption rights for same-sex couples, abortion rights, and the legalization of marijuana.

== Early life and education ==
Goldwater was born on January 2, 1909, in Phoenix, Arizona, in what was then the Arizona Territory, the son of Baron M. Goldwater and his wife, Hattie Josephine "JoJo" Williams. Goldwater long believed that he was born on January 1, 1909, and thus works published during his career list this as his date of birth; however, in his later years, he discovered documentation revealing that he was actually born at 3 a.m. on January 2. His father's family founded Goldwater's Department Store, a leading upscale department store in Phoenix. Goldwater's paternal grandfather, Michel Goldwasser, a Polish Jew, was born in 1821 in Konin, then part of Congress Poland. He emigrated to London following the Revolutions of 1848. Soon after arriving in London, Michel anglicized his name to Michael Goldwater. Michel married Sarah Nathan, a member of an English-Jewish family, in the Great Synagogue of London.

The Goldwaters later emigrated to the United States, first arriving in San Francisco, California, before finally settling in the Arizona Territory, where Michael Goldwater opened a small department store that was later taken over and expanded by his three sons, Henry, Baron, and Morris. Morris Goldwater (1852–1939) was an Arizona territorial and state legislator, mayor of Prescott, Arizona, delegate to the Arizona Constitutional Convention, and later President of the Arizona State Senate.

Goldwater's father was Jewish, but Goldwater was raised in his mother's Episcopal faith. Hattie Williams came from an established New England family that included the theologian Roger Williams of Rhode Island. Goldwater's parents were married in an Episcopal church in Phoenix; for his entire life, Goldwater was an Episcopalian, though on rare occasions he referred to himself as Jewish. While he did not often attend church, he stated that "If a man acts in a religious way, an ethical way, then he's really a religious man—and it doesn't have a lot to do with how often he gets inside a church." His first cousin was Julius Goldwater, a convert to Buddhism and Jodo Shinshu priest who assisted interned Japanese Americans during World War II.

After a poor academic performance as a high school freshman, Goldwater's parents sent him to Staunton Military Academy in Staunton, Virginia, where he played varsity football, basketball, track, and swimming; was senior class treasurer; and attained the rank of captain. He graduated from the academy in 1928 and enrolled at the University of Arizona, where he attended for one year before dropping out. Goldwater is the most recent non-college graduate to be the nominee of a major political party in a presidential election. Goldwater entered the family's business around the time of his father's death in 1930. He took over the department store six years later, although he was not particularly enthusiastic about running the business.

== Career ==
=== U.S. Air Force ===
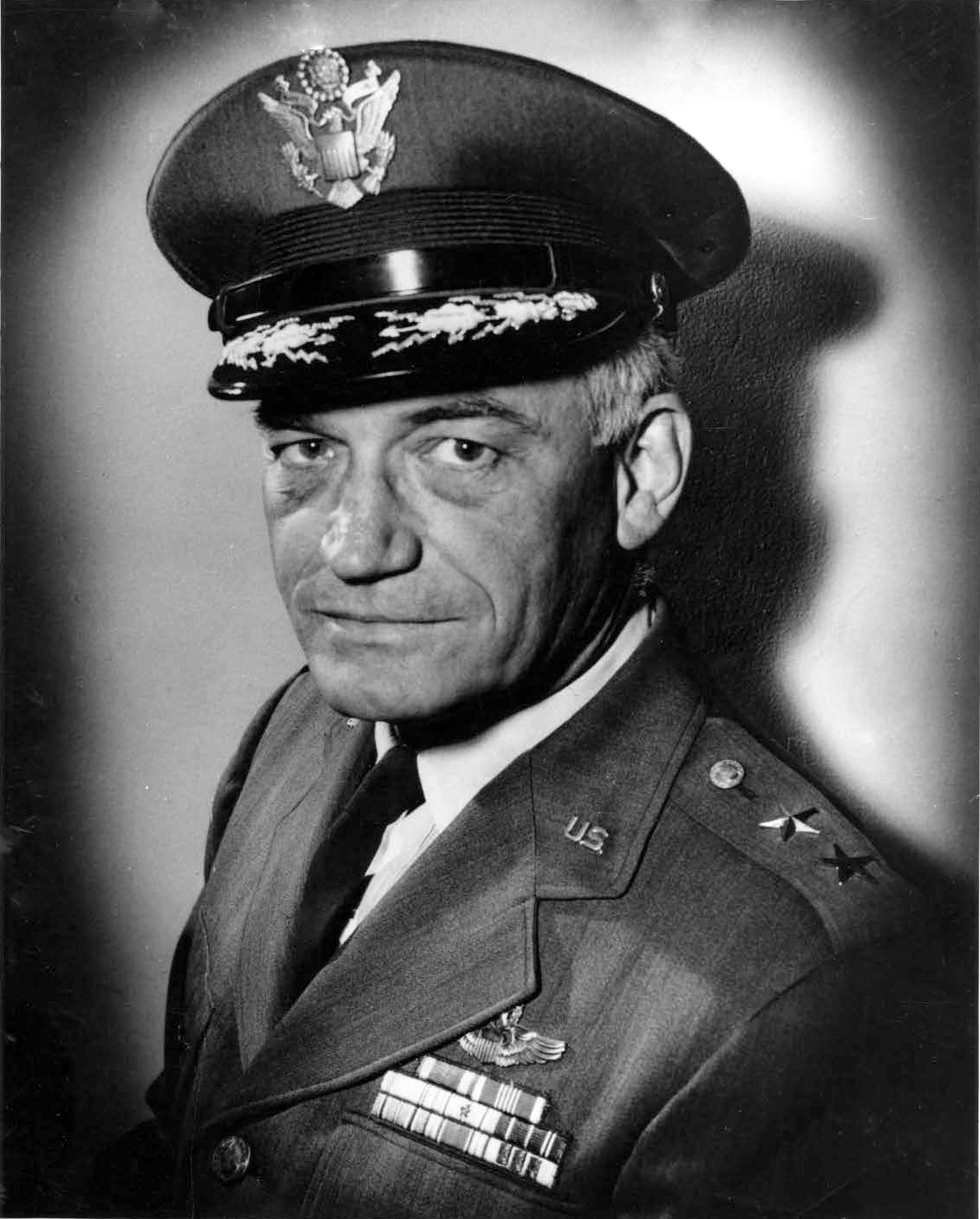
Goldwater as a major general in the United States Air Force, c. 1967

After the United States entered World War II, Goldwater received a reserve commission in the United States Army Air Force. Goldwater trained as a pilot and was assigned to the Ferry Command, a newly formed unit that flew aircraft and supplies to war zones worldwide. He spent most of the war flying between the U.S. and India via the Azores and North Africa or South America, Nigeria, and Central Africa. Goldwater also flew "The Hump", one of the most dangerous routes for supply planes during WWII. The route required aircraft to fly directly over the Himalayas in order to deliver desperately needed supplies to the Republic of China.

Following the end of World War II in 1945, Goldwater was a leading proponent of creating the United States Air Force Academy and later served on the academy's Board of Visitors. The visitor center at the academy is now named in his honor. Goldwater remained in the Army Air Reserve after the war, and in 1946, at the rank of colonel, Goldwater founded the Arizona Air National Guard. Goldwater ordered the Arizona Air National Guard desegregated, two years before the rest of the U.S. military. In the early 1960s, while a U.S. senator, he commanded the 9999th Air Reserve Squadron as a major general. Goldwater was instrumental in pushing the Pentagon to support the desegregation of the armed services.

Goldwater remained in the Arizona Air National Guard until 1967, retiring as a command pilot with the rank of major general.

As a U.S. senator, Goldwater had a sign in his office that referenced his military career and mindset: "There are old pilots and there are bold pilots, but there are no old, bold pilots."

=== Early political involvement ===
In a heavily Democratic state, Goldwater became a conservative Republican and a friend of Herbert Hoover. He was outspoken against New Deal liberalism, especially its close ties to labor unions. A pilot, amateur radio operator, outdoorsman, and photographer, he criss-crossed Arizona and developed a deep interest in both the natural and the human history of the state. He entered Phoenix politics in 1949, when he was elected to the City Council as part of a nonpartisan team of candidates pledged to clean up widespread prostitution and gambling, serving at large from 1949 to 1952. The team won every mayoral and council election for the next two decades. Goldwater rebuilt the weak Republican Party, and was instrumental in electing Howard Pyle as Governor in 1950.

==== Support for civil rights ====
Goldwater was a supporter of racial equality. He integrated his family's business upon taking over control in the 1930s. A lifetime member of the NAACP, Goldwater helped found the group's Arizona chapter. He saw to it that the Arizona Air National Guard was racially integrated from its inception in 1946, two years before President Truman ordered the military as a whole be integrated (a process that was not completed until 1954). Goldwater worked with Phoenix civil rights leaders to successfully integrate public schools a year prior to Brown v. Board of Education. Despite this support of civil rights, he remained in objection to some major federal civil rights legislation. Civil rights leaders like Martin Luther King Jr. remarked of him, "while not himself a racist, Mr. Goldwater articulates a philosophy which gives aid and comfort to the racists."

Goldwater was an early member and largely unrecognized supporter of the National Urban League's Phoenix chapter, going so far as to cover the group's early operating deficits with his personal funds. Though the NAACP denounced Goldwater in the harshest of terms when he ran for president, the Urban League conferred on him the 1991 Humanitarian Award "for 50 years of loyal service to the Phoenix Urban League". In response to League members who objected, citing Goldwater's vote on the Civil Rights Act of 1964, the League president pointed out that he had saved the League more than once, saying he preferred to judge a person "on the basis of his daily actions rather than on his voting record".

=== U.S. Senator ===
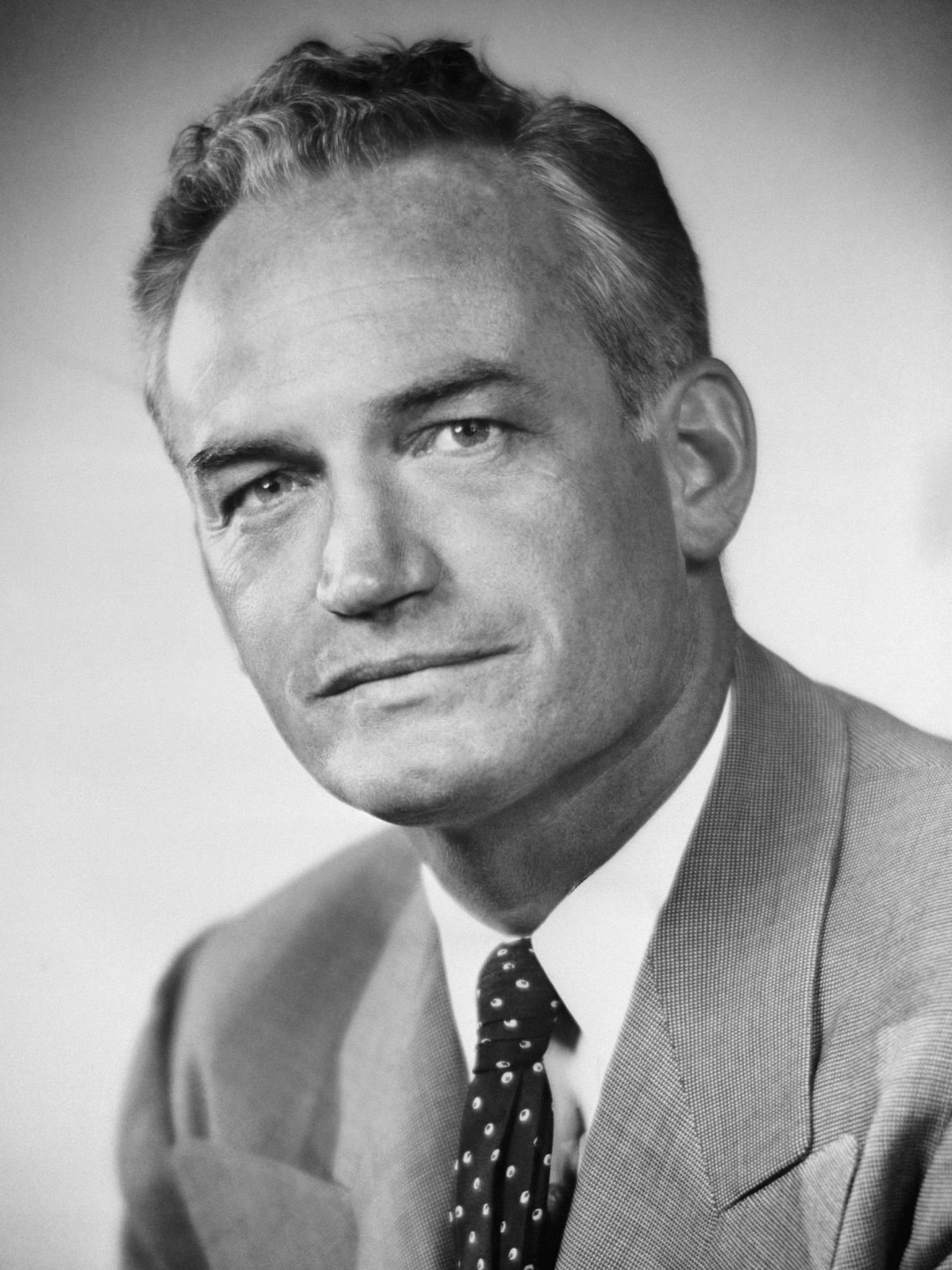
Goldwater's campaign portrait in the 1952 U.S. Senate campaign

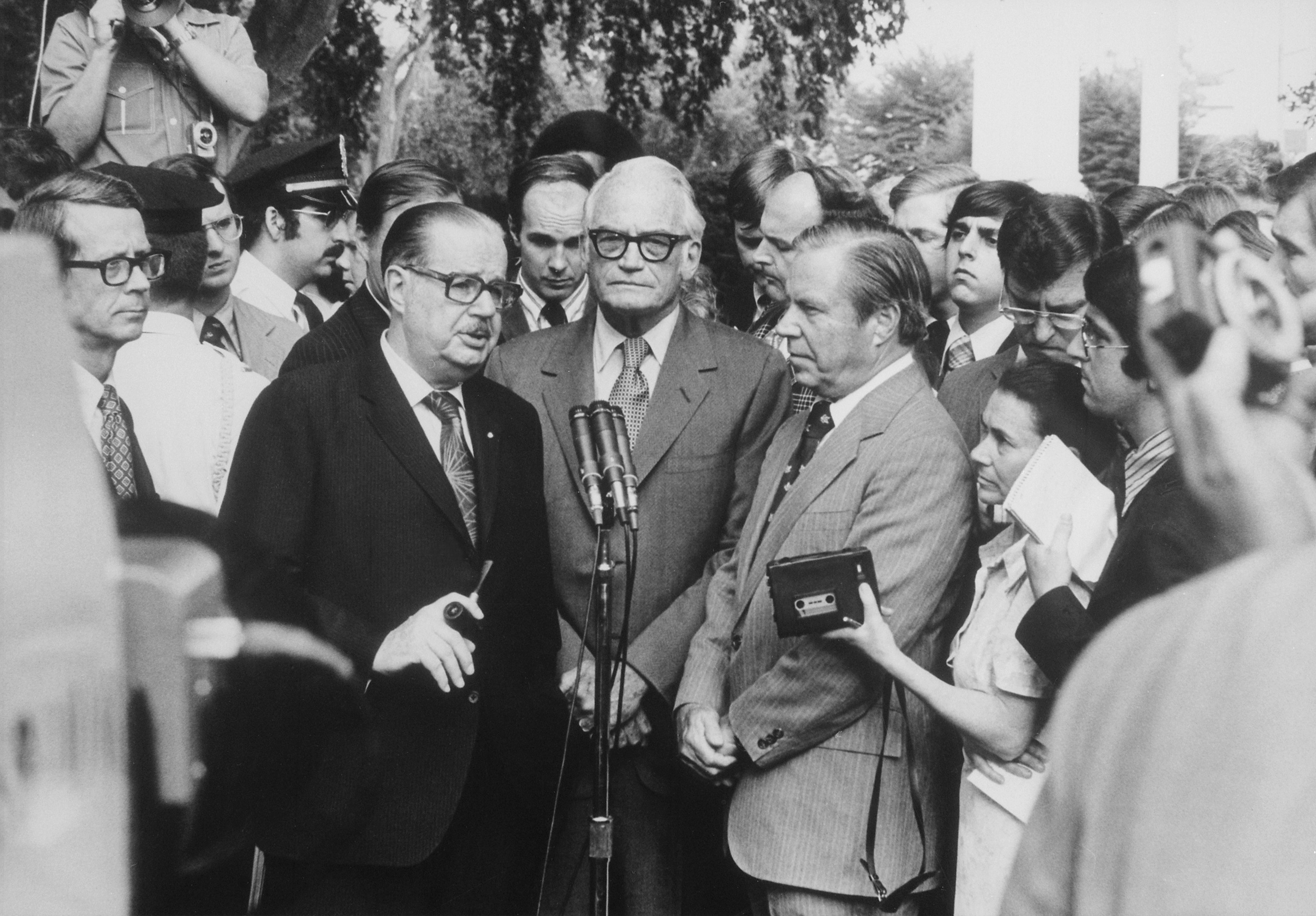
Goldwater's informal press conference on August 7, 1974, following a meeting between Goldwater, U.S. Senate Minority Leader Hugh Scott, U.S. House Minority Leader John Jacob Rhodes, and President Richard Nixon to discuss the Watergate scandal and impeachment process. The following evening, on August 8, 1974, President Nixon announced his resignation in a nationally televised address.

Running as a Republican, Goldwater won a narrow upset victory seat in the 1952 Arizona Senate election against veteran Democrat and Senate Majority Leader Ernest McFarland. He won largely by defeating McFarland in his native Maricopa County by 12,600 votes, almost double the overall margin of 6,725 votes.

Goldwater defeated McFarland by a larger margin when he ran again in 1958. Following his strong re-election showing, he became the first Arizona Republican to win a second term in the U.S. Senate. Goldwater's victory was all the more remarkable since it came in a year Democrats gained 13 seats in the Senate.

During his Senate career, Goldwater was regarded as the "Grand Old Man of the Republican Party and one of the nation's most respected exponents of conservatism".

==== Criticism of Eisenhower administration ====
Goldwater was outspoken about the Eisenhower administration, calling some of the policies of the administration too liberal for a Republican president. "Democrats delighted in pointing out that the junior senator was so headstrong that he had gone out his way to criticize the president of his own party." There was a Democratic majority in Congress for most of Eisenhower's career, and Goldwater felt that President Dwight Eisenhower was compromising too much with Democrats in order to get legislation passed. Early on in his career as a senator for Arizona, he criticized the $71.8 billion budget that President Eisenhower sent to Congress, stating, "Now, however, I am not so sure. A $71.8 billion budget not only shocks me, but it weakens my faith." Goldwater opposed Eisenhower's pick of Earl Warren for Chief Justice of the United States. "The day that Eisenhower appointed Governor Earl Warren of California as Chief Justice of the Supreme Court, Goldwater did not hesitate to express his misgivings." However, Goldwater was present in the United States Senate on March 1, 1954, when Warren was unanimously confirmed, voted in favor of Eisenhower's nomination of John Marshall Harlan II on March 16, 1955, was present for the unanimous nominations of William J. Brennan Jr. and Charles Evans Whittaker on March 19, 1957, and voted in favor of the nomination of Potter Stewart on May 5, 1959.

==== Stance on civil rights ====
In his first year in the Senate, Goldwater was responsible for the desegregation of the Senate cafeteria after he insisted that his Black legislative assistant, Katherine Maxwell, be served along with every other Senate employee.

Goldwater and the Eisenhower administration supported the integration of schools in the South, but Goldwater felt the states should choose how they wanted to integrate and should not be forced by the federal government. "Goldwater criticized the use of federal troops. He accused the Eisenhower administration of violating the Constitution by assuming powers reserved by the states. While he agreed that under the law, every state should have integrated its schools, each state should integrate in its own way." There were high-ranking government officials following Goldwater's critical stance on the Eisenhower administration, even an Army General. "Fulbright's startling revelation that military personnel were being indoctrinated with the idea that the policies of the Commander in Chief were treasonous dovetailed with the return to the news of the strange case of General Edwin Walker."

In his 1960 book The Conscience of a Conservative, Goldwater stated that he supported the stated objectives of the Supreme Court's decision in Brown v. Board of Education, but argued that the federal government had no role in ordering states to desegregate public schools. He wrote:

I believe that it is both wise and just for negro children to attend the same schools as whites, and that to deny them this opportunity carries with it strong implications of inferiority. I am not prepared, however, to impose that judgement of mine on the people of Mississippi or South Carolina, or to tell them what methods should be adopted and what pace should be kept in striving toward that goal. That is their business, not mine. I believe that the problem of race relations, like all social and cultural problems, is best handled by the people directly concerned. Social and cultural change, however desirable, should not be effected by the engines of national power."

Goldwater voted in favor of both the Civil Rights Act of 1957 and the Twenty-fourth Amendment to the U.S. Constitution, but did not vote on the Civil Rights Act of 1960 because he was absent from the chamber while Senate Minority Whip Thomas Kuchel (R–CA) announced that Goldwater would have voted in favor if present. While he did vote in favor of it while in committee, Goldwater reluctantly voted against the Civil Rights Act of 1964 when it came to the floor. Later, Goldwater would state that he was mostly in support of the bill, but he disagreed with Titles II and VII, which both dealt with employment, making him imply that the law would end in the government dictating hiring and firing policy for millions of Americans. Congressional Republicans overwhelmingly supported the bill, with Goldwater being joined by only five other Republican senators in voting against it. It is likely that Goldwater significantly underestimated the effect this would have, as his vote against the bill hurt him with voters across the country, including from his own party. In the 1990s, Goldwater would call his vote on the Civil Rights Act "one of his greatest regrets." Goldwater was absent from the Senate during President John F. Kennedy's nomination of Byron White to Supreme Court on April 11, 1962, but was present when Arthur Goldberg was unanimously confirmed.

== 1964 presidential election ==
Goldwater's direct style had made him extremely popular with the Republican Party's suburban conservative voters, based in the South and the senator's native West. Following the success of The Conscience of a Conservative, Goldwater became the frontrunner for the GOP Presidential nomination to run against John F. Kennedy. Despite their disagreements on politics, Goldwater and Kennedy had grown to become close friends during the eight years they served alongside each other in the Senate. With Goldwater the clear GOP frontrunner, he and Kennedy began planning to campaign together, holding Lincoln-Douglas style debates across the country and avoiding a race defined by the kind of negative attacks that were increasingly coming to define American politics.

=== Republican primary ===
Republican primaries results by state No primary held John W. Byrnes Barry Goldwater Henry Cabot Lodge Jr. James A. Rhodes Nelson Rockefeller William W. Scranton In South Dakota and Florida, Goldwater finished second to "unpledged delegates", but he finished before all other candidates.

Goldwater was grief-stricken by the assassination of Kennedy and was greatly disappointed that his opponent in 1964 would not be Kennedy but instead his vice president, former Senate Majority Leader Lyndon B. Johnson of Texas. Goldwater disliked Johnson, later telling columnist John Kolbe that Johnson had "used every dirty trick in the bag."

At the time of Goldwater's presidential candidacy, the Republican Party was split between its conservative wing (based in the West and South) and moderate/liberal wing, sometimes called Rockefeller Republicans (based in the Northeast and Midwest). Goldwater alarmed even some of his fellow partisans with his brand of staunch fiscal conservatism and militant anti-communism. He was viewed by many moderate and liberal Republicans as being too far on the right wing of the political spectrum to appeal to the mainstream majority necessary to win a national election. As a result, moderate and liberal Republicans recruited a series of opponents, including New York Governor Nelson Rockefeller, Henry Cabot Lodge Jr., of Massachusetts and Pennsylvania Governor William Scranton, to challenge him. Goldwater received solid backing from most of the few Southern Republicans then in politics. A young Birmingham lawyer, John Grenier, secured commitments from 271 of 279 Southern convention delegates to back Goldwater. Grenier would serve as executive director of the national GOP during the Goldwater campaign, the number two position to party chairman Dean Burch of Arizona. Goldwater fought and won a multi-candidate race for the Republican Party's presidential nomination.

=== 1964 Republican National Convention ===
Eisenhower gave his support to Goldwater when he told reporters, "I personally believe that Goldwater is not an extremist as some people have made him, but in any event we're all Republicans." His nomination was staunchly opposed by the so-called Liberal Republicans, who thought Goldwater's demand for active measures to defeat the Soviet Union would foment a nuclear war. In addition to Rockefeller, prominent Republican office-holders refused to endorse Goldwater's candidacy, including both Republican senators from New York Kenneth B. Keating and Jacob Javits, Pennsylvania governor William Scranton, Michigan governor George Romney and Congressman John V. Lindsay (NY-17). Rockefeller Republican Jackie Robinson walked out of the convention in disgust over Goldwater's nomination. Henry Cabot Lodge Jr., who was Richard Nixon's running mate in 1960, also opposed Goldwater, calling his proposal of realigning the Democrat and Republican parties into two Liberal and Conservative parties "totally abhorrent" and thought that no one in their right mind should oppose the federal government in having a role in the future of America.

In the face of such opposition, Goldwater delivered a well-received acceptance speech. According to the author Lee Edwards: "[Goldwater] devoted more care [to it] than to any other speech in his political career. And with good reason: he would deliver it to the largest and most attentive audience of his life." Journalist John Adams commented: "his acceptance speech was bold, reflecting his conservative views, but not irrational. Rather than shrinking from those critics who accuse him of extremism, Goldwater challenged them head-on" in his acceptance speech at the 1964 Republican Convention. In his own words:

I would remind you that extremism in the defense of liberty is no vice! [40 seconds of applause by the crowd] And let me remind you also that moderation in the pursuit of justice is no virtue! [10 seconds of applause]

One of Goldwater's speechwriters, Harry V. Jaffa, proposed these two lines which Goldwater stated were paraphrased from Cicero, although America's founding fathers and Martin Luther King Jr. had expressed similar sentiments. Because of President Johnson's popularity, Goldwater refrained from attacking the president directly. He did not mention Johnson by name at all in his convention speech.

Although raised as an Episcopalian, Goldwater was the first candidate of Jewish descent, through his father, to be nominated for president by a major American party.

=== 1964 general presidential campaign ===
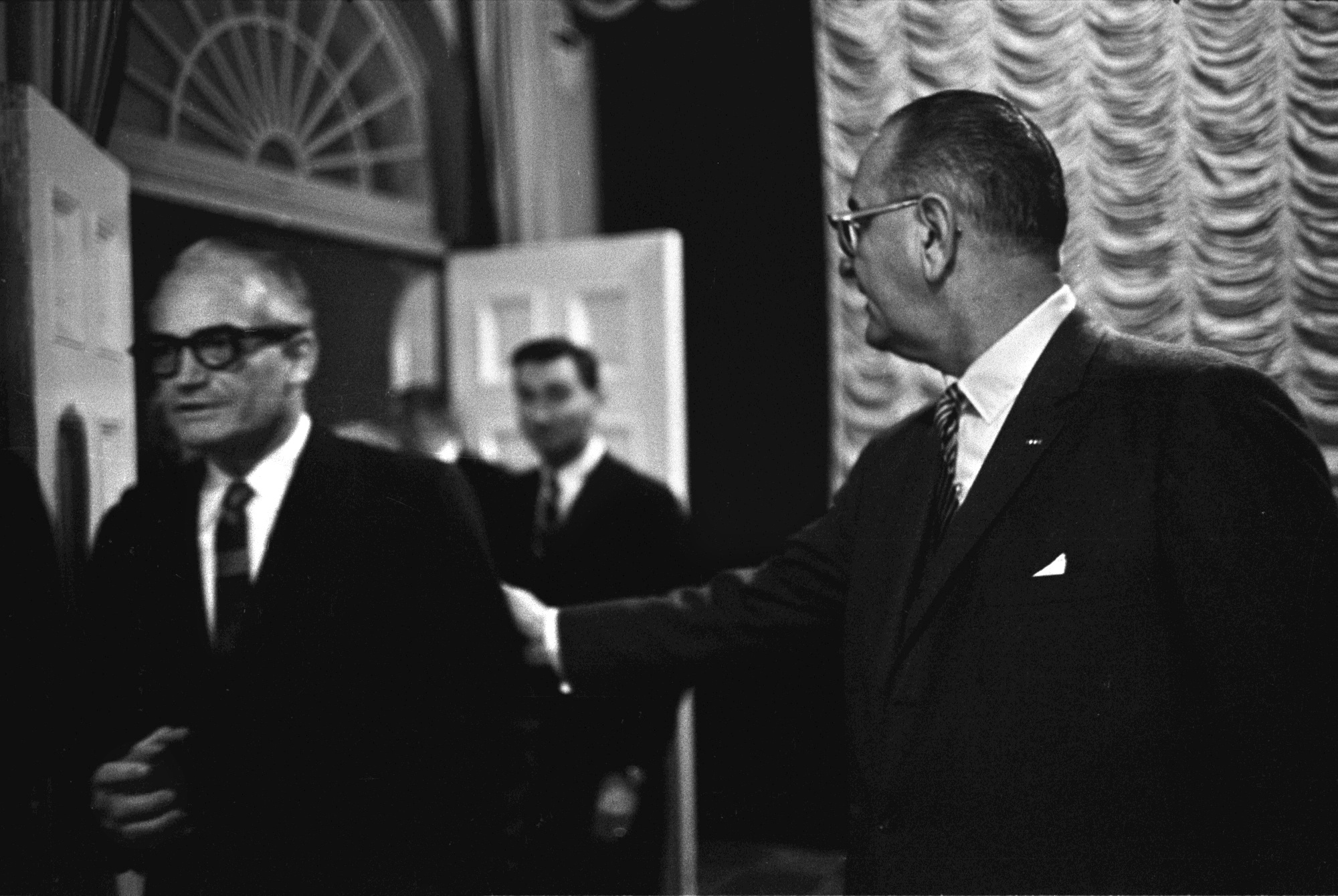
President Lyndon B. Johnson with U.S. Senator Goldwater on January 16, 1964

After securing the Republican presidential nomination, Goldwater chose his political ally, RNC Chairman William E. Miller, to be his running mate. Goldwater joked he chose Miller because "he drives Johnson nuts". In choosing Miller, Goldwater opted for a running mate who was ideologically aligned with his own conservative wing of the Republican party. Miller balanced the ticket in other ways, being a practicing Catholic from the East Coast. Miller had low name recognition but was popular in the Republican party and viewed as a skilled political strategist.

Former U.S. senator Prescott Bush, a moderate Republican from Connecticut, was a friend of Goldwater and supported him in the general election campaign.

Future chief justice of the United States and fellow Arizonan William H. Rehnquist also first came to the attention of national Republicans through his work as a legal adviser to Goldwater's presidential campaign. Rehnquist had begun his law practice in 1953 in the firm of Denison Kitchel of Phoenix, Goldwater's national campaign manager and friend of nearly three decades.

Goldwater's advocacy of active interventionism to prevent the spread of communism and defend American values and allies led to effective counterattacks from Lyndon B. Johnson and his supporters, who said that Goldwater's militancy would have dire consequences, possibly even nuclear war. In a May 1964 speech, Goldwater suggested that nuclear weapons should be treated more like conventional weapons and used in Vietnam, specifically that they should have been used at Dien Bien Phu in 1954 to defoliate trees. Regarding Vietnam, Goldwater charged that Johnson's policy was devoid of "goal, course, or purpose," leaving "only sudden death in the jungles and the slow strangulation of freedom". Goldwater's rhetoric on nuclear war was viewed by many as quite uncompromising, a view buttressed by off-hand comments such as, "Let's lob one into the men's room at the Kremlin." He also advocated that field commanders in Europe should be given the authority to use tactical nuclear weapons (which he called "small conventional nuclear weapons") without presidential confirmation.

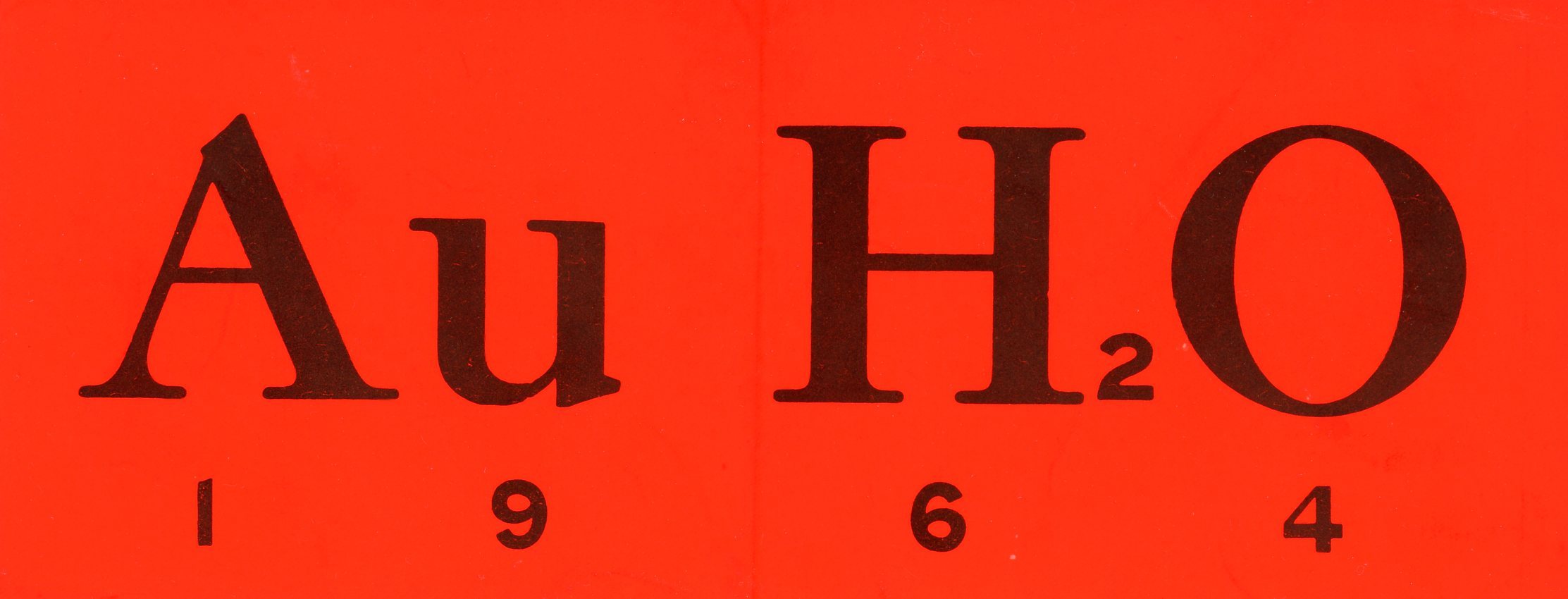
A bumper sticker from Goldwater's 1964 presidential campaign, representing the Goldwater surname as Au = gold and H_{2}O = water

Goldwater countered the Johnson attacks by criticizing the administration for its perceived ethical lapses, and stating in a commercial that "we, as a nation, are not far from the kind of moral decay that has brought on the fall of other nations and people.... I say it is time to put conscience back in government. And by good example, put it back in all walks of American life." Goldwater campaign commercials included statements of support by actor Raymond Massey and moderate Republican senator Margaret Chase Smith.

Before the 1964 election, Fact magazine, published by Ralph Ginzburg, ran a special issue titled, "The Unconscious of a Conservative: A Special Issue on the Mind of Barry Goldwater". The two main articles contended that Goldwater was mentally unfit to be president. The magazine supported this claim with the results of a poll of board-certified psychiatrists. Fact had mailed questionnaires to 12,356 psychiatrists, receiving responses from 2,417, of whom 1,189 said Goldwater was mentally incapable of holding the office of president. Most of the other respondents declined to diagnose Goldwater because they had not clinically interviewed him but said that, although not psychologically unfit to preside, Goldwater would be negligent in the role.

After the election, Goldwater sued the publisher, the editor and the magazine for libel in Goldwater v. Ginzburg. "Although the jury awarded Goldwater only $1.00 in compensatory damages against all three defendants, it went on to award him punitive damages of $25,000 against Ginzburg and $50,000 against Fact magazine, Inc." According to Warren Boroson, then-managing editor of Fact and later a financial columnist, the main biography of Goldwater in the magazine was written by Israeli pianist David Bar-Illan.

==== Political advertising ====
President Johnson's anti-Goldwater "Daisy" advertisement

A Democratic campaign advertisement known as Daisy showed a young girl counting daisy petals, from one to ten. Immediately following this scene, a voiceover counted down from ten to one. The child's face was shown as a still photograph followed by images of nuclear explosions and mushroom clouds. The campaign advertisement ended with a plea to vote for Johnson, implying that Goldwater (though not mentioned by name) would provoke a nuclear war if elected. The advertisement, which featured only a few spoken words and relied on imagery for its emotional impact, was one of the most provocative in American political campaign history, and many analysts credit it as being the birth of the modern style of "negative political ads" on television. The ad aired only once and was immediately pulled, but it was then shown many times by local television stations covering the controversy.

Goldwater did not have ties to the Ku Klux Klan (KKK), but he was publicly endorsed by members of the organization. Lyndon B. Johnson exploited this association during the elections, but Goldwater barred the KKK from supporting him and denounced them.

Throughout the presidential campaign, Goldwater refused to appeal to racial tensions or backlash against civil rights. After the outbreak of the Harlem riot of 1964, Goldwater privately gathered news reporters on his campaign plane and said that if anyone attempted to sow racial violence on his political behalf, he would withdraw from the presidential race—even if it was the day before the election.

Past comments came back to haunt Goldwater throughout the campaign. He had once called the Eisenhower administration "a dime-store New Deal", and the former president never fully forgave him. However, Eisenhower did film a television commercial with Goldwater. Eisenhower qualified his voting for Goldwater in November by remarking that he had voted not specifically for Goldwater, but for the Republican Party. In December 1961, Goldwater had told a news conference that "sometimes I think this country would be better off if we could just saw off the Eastern Seaboard and let it float out to sea." That comment boomeranged on him during the campaign in the form of a Johnson television commercial, as did remarks about making Social Security voluntary, and statements in Tennessee about selling the Tennessee Valley Authority, a large local New Deal employer.

The Goldwater campaign spotlighted Ronald Reagan, who appeared in a campaign ad. In turn, Reagan gave a stirring, nationally televised speech, "A Time for Choosing", in support of Goldwater.

=== Results ===
Electoral College results by state

Goldwater only won his home state of Arizona and five states in the Deep South: Alabama, Georgia, Louisiana, Mississippi, and South Carolina. The Southern states, traditionally Democratic up to that time, voted Republican primarily as a statement of opposition to the Civil Rights Act, which had been signed into law by Johnson earlier that year. Despite Johnson's support for the Civil Rights Act, the bill received split support from Congressional Democrats due to southerner opposition. In contrast, Congressional Republicans overwhelmingly supported the bill, with Goldwater being joined by only five other Republican senators in voting against it. All of the states carried by Goldwater, except Arizona, had voted against Republican nominee Richard Nixon just four years earlier. In carrying Georgia by a margin of 54–45%, Goldwater became the first Republican nominee to win the state.

Goldwater's poor showing pulled down many supporters. Of the 57 Republican Congressmen who endorsed Goldwater before the convention, 20 were defeated for reelection, along with many promising young Republicans. In contrast, Republican Congressman John Lindsay (NY-17), who refused to endorse Goldwater, was handily re-elected in a district where Democrats held a 10% overall advantage. On the other hand, the defeat of so many older politicians created openings for young conservatives to move up the ladder. While the loss of moderate Republicans was temporary—they were back by 1966—Goldwater also permanently pulled many conservative Southerners and whites out of the New Deal Coalition.

According to Steve Kornacki of Salon, "Goldwater broke through and won five [Southern] states—the best showing in the region for a GOP candidate since Reconstruction. In Mississippi—where Franklin D. Roosevelt had won nearly 100 percent of the vote 28 years earlier—Goldwater claimed a staggering 87 percent." It has frequently been argued that Goldwater's strong performance in Southern states previously regarded as Democratic strongholds foreshadowed a larger shift in electoral trends in the coming decades that would make the South a Republican bastion (an end to the "Solid South")—first in presidential politics and eventually at the congressional and state levels, as well. Also, Goldwater's uncompromising promotion of freedom was the start of a continuing shift in American politics from liberalism to a conservative economic philosophy.

== Return to U.S. Senate ==
Goldwater speaking at the 1968 Republican National Convention

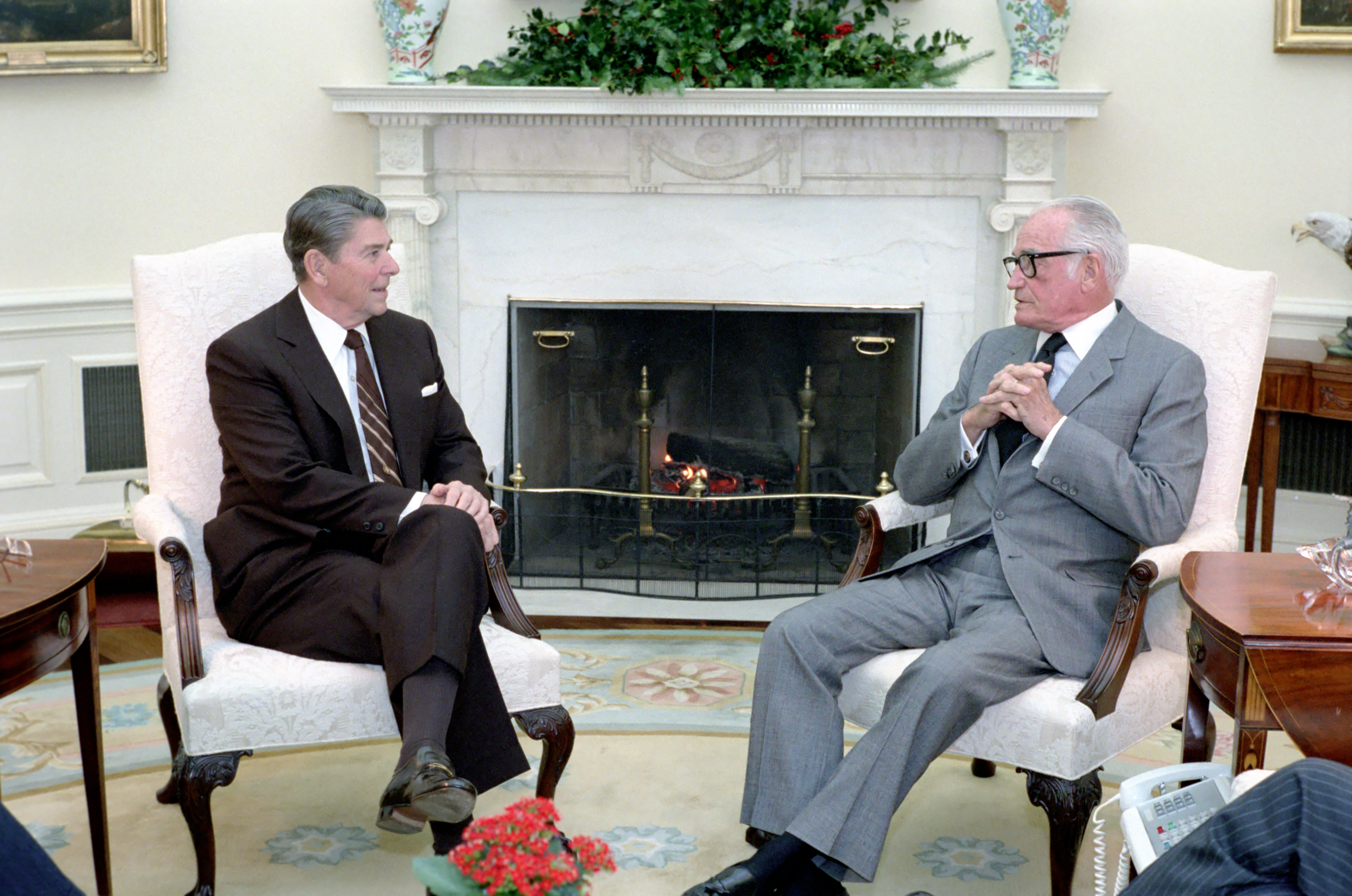
Goldwater meeting with President Ronald Reagan in the Oval Office in December 1984

Throughout the late 1970s, as the conservative wing under Ronald Reagan gained control of the Republican Party, Goldwater concentrated on his Senate duties, especially in military affairs. Goldwater purportedly did not like Richard Nixon on either a political or personal level, later calling the California Republican "the most dishonest individual I have ever met in my life". Accordingly, he played little part in Nixon's election or administration, but he helped force Nixon's resignation in 1974. On August 7, 1974, at the height of the Watergate scandal, Goldwater led a delegation, which also included House Republican Leader John Jacob Rhodes and Senate Republican Leader Hugh Scott, who met with Nixon at the White House and urged him to resign. At the time, Nixon's impeachment by the House of Representatives was imminent and Goldwater warned him that fewer than 10 Republican senators would vote against conviction.

Despite being a difficult year for Republican candidates, the 1974 election saw Goldwater easily reelected over his Democratic opponent, Jonathan Marshall, the publisher of The Scottsdale Progress.

With regard to the 1976 Republican ticket, Goldwater helped block Nelson Rockefeller's renomination as vice president. When Reagan challenged Gerald Ford for the presidential nomination in 1976, Goldwater endorsed the incumbent Ford, looking for consensus rather than conservative idealism. As one historian notes, "The Arizonan had lost much of his zest for battle."

In 1979, when President Carter normalized relations with Communist China, Goldwater and some other Senators sued him in the Supreme Court, arguing that the President could not terminate the Sino-American Mutual Defense Treaty with the Republic of China (Taiwan) without the approval of Congress. The case, Goldwater v. Carter (444 U.S. 996), was dismissed by the court as a political question.

On June 9, 1969, Goldwater was absent during President Nixon's nomination of Warren E. Burger as Chief Justice of the United States while Senate Minority Whip Hugh Scott announced that Goldwater would have voted in favor if present. Goldwater voted in favor of Nixon's failed Supreme Court nomination of Clement Haynsworth on November 21, 1969, and a few months later, Goldwater voted in favor of Nixon's failed Supreme Court nomination of Harrold Carswell on April 8, 1970. The following month, Goldwater was absent when Nixon nominee Harry Blackmun was confirmed on May 12, 1970, while Senate Minority Whip Robert P. Griffin announced that Goldwater would have voted in favor if present. On December 6, 1971, Goldwater voted in favor of Nixon's nomination of Lewis F. Powell Jr., and on December 10, Goldwater voted in favor of Nixon's nomination of William Rehnquist as Associate Justice. On December 17, 1975, Goldwater voted in favor of President Gerald Ford's nomination of John Paul Stevens to the Supreme Court.

=== Final campaign and U.S. Senate term ===
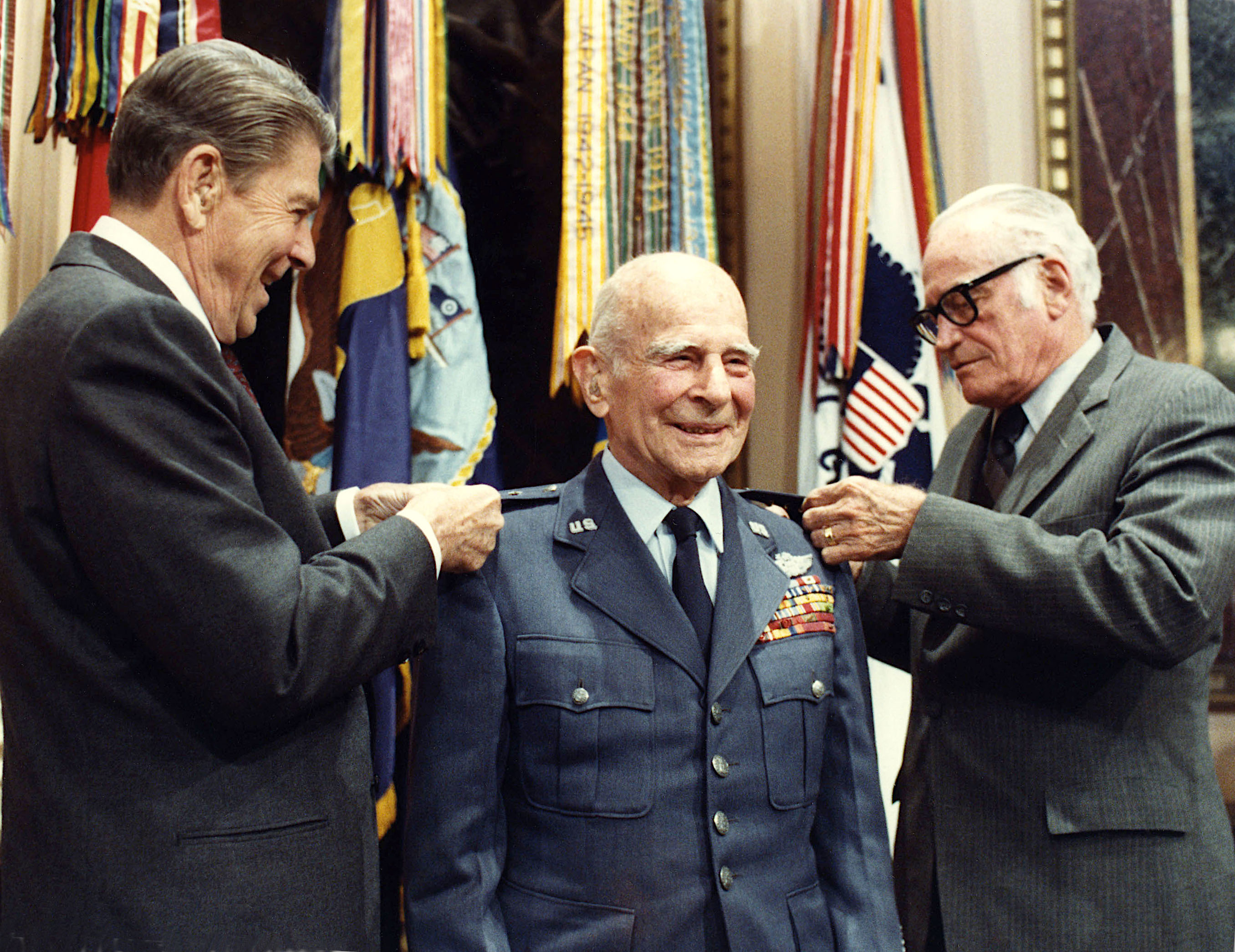
President Reagan and U.S. Senator Goldwater award retired U.S. Air Force General Jimmy Doolittle with a fourth star in April 1985.

With his fourth Senate term due to end in January 1981, Goldwater seriously considered retiring from the Senate in 1980 before deciding to run for one final term. It was a surprisingly tough campaign for re-election. Goldwater was viewed by some as out of touch and vulnerable for several reasons, chiefly because he had planned to retire in 1981 and he had not visited many areas of Arizona outside of Phoenix and Tucson. Additionally, his Democratic challenger, Bill Schulz, proved to be a formidable opponent. A former Republican and a wealthy real estate developer, Schulz's campaign slogan was "Energy for the Eighties." Arizona's changing population also hurt Goldwater. The state's population had greatly increased, and a large portion of the electorate had not lived in the state at the time Goldwater was previously elected, meaning unlike most incumbents, many voters were less familiar with Goldwater's actual beliefs. Goldwater spent most of the campaign on the defensive. Although he was eventually declared as the winning candidate in the general election by a very narrow margin, receiving 49.5% of the vote to Schulz's 48.4%, early returns on election night indicated that Schulz would win. The counting of votes continued through the night and into the next morning. At around daybreak, Goldwater learned that he had been reelected thanks to absentee ballots, which were among the last to be counted.

Goldwater's close victory in 1980 came despite Reagan's 61% landslide over Jimmy Carter in Arizona. Despite Goldwater's struggles, in 1980, Republicans were able to pick up 12 senate seats, regaining control of the chamber for the first time since 1955, when Goldwater was in his first term. Goldwater was now in the most powerful position he had ever been in the Senate. In October 1983, Goldwater voted against the legislation establishing Martin Luther King Jr. Day as a federal holiday.

On September 21, 1981, Goldwater voted in favor of Reagan's Supreme Court nomination of Sandra Day O'Connor. Goldwater was absent during the nominations of William Rehnquist as Chief Justice of the United States and Antonin Scalia as Associate Justice on September 17, 1986.

After the new Senate convened in January 1981, Goldwater became chairman of the Senate Intelligence Committee. In this role he clashed with the Reagan administration in April 1984 when he discovered that the Central Intelligence Agency (CIA) had been mining the waters of Nicaragua since February, something that he had first denied when the matter was raised. In a note to the CIA director William Casey, Goldwater denounced what he called an "act of war", saying that "this is no way to run a railroad" as he stated crossly that only Congress had the power to declare war and accused the CIA of illegally mining Nicaraguan waters without the permission of Congress. Goldwater concluded, "The President has asked us to back his foreign policy. Bill, how can we back his foreign policy when we don't know what the hell he is doing? Lebanon, yes, we all knew that he sent troops over there. But mine the harbors in Nicaragua? This is an act violating international law. It is an act of war. For the life of me, I don't see how we are going to explain it." Goldwater felt compelled to issue an apology on the floor of the Senate because the Senate Intelligence Committee had failed in its duties to oversee the CIA as he stated, saying, "I am forced to apologize for the members of my committee because I did not know the facts on this case. And I apologize to all the members of the Senate for the same reason". Goldwater subsequently voted for a Congressional resolution condemning the mining.

In his 1980 Senate reelection campaign, Goldwater won support from religious conservatives but in his final term voted consistently to uphold legal abortion and in 1981 gave a speech on how he was angry about the bullying of American politicians by religious organizations and would "fight them every step of the way".

He introduced the 1984 Cable Franchise Policy and Communications Act, which allowed local governments to require the transmission of public, educational, and government access (PEG) channels, barred cable operators from exercising editorial control over the content of programs carried on PEG channels and absolved them from liability for their content. On May 12, 1986, Goldwater was presented with the Presidential Medal of Freedom by President Reagan.

In response to Moral Majority founder Jerry Falwell's opposition to the nomination of Sandra Day O'Connor to the Supreme Court, of which Falwell had said, "Every good Christian should be concerned", Goldwater retorted, "Every good Christian ought to kick Falwell right in the ass." According to John Dean, Goldwater actually suggested that good Christians ought to kick Falwell in the "nuts", but the news media "changed the anatomical reference". Goldwater also had harsh words for his one-time political protégé, President Reagan, particularly after the Iran–Contra Affair became public in 1986. Journalist Robert MacNeil, a friend of Goldwater's from the 1964 presidential campaign, recalled interviewing him in his office shortly afterward. "He was sitting in his office with his hands on his cane... and he said to me, 'Well, aren't you going to ask me about the Iran arms sales?' It had just been announced that the Reagan administration had sold arms to Iran. And I said, 'Well, if I asked you, what would you say?' He said, 'I'd say it's the god-damned stupidest foreign policy blunder this country's ever made!'" Aside from the Iran–Contra scandal, Goldwater thought nonetheless that Reagan was a good president.

=== Retirement ===
Goldwater said later that the close result in 1980 convinced him not to run again. He retired in 1987, serving as Chair of the Senate Intelligence and Armed Services Committees in his final term. Despite his reputation as a firebrand in the 1960s, by the end of his career, he was considered a stabilizing influence in the Senate, one of the most respected members of either major party. Although Goldwater remained staunchly anti-communist and "hawkish" on military issues, he was a key supporter of the fight for ratification of the Panama Canal Treaty in the 1970s, which would give control of the canal zone to the Republic of Panama. His most important legislative achievement may have been the Goldwater–Nichols Act, which reorganized the U.S. military's senior-command structure.

== Policies ==
Goldwater, a supporter of the conservative coalition in Congress, became most associated with anti-union work and anti-communism. His efforts led Congress to pass major anti-labor reforms in 1957, prompting the AFL–CIO to challenge his 1958 reelection bid.

He voted against the censure of Senator Joseph McCarthy in 1954, who had been making unfounded claims about communists infiltrating the U.S. State Department during the Red Scare, without actually accusing any individual of being a communist or Soviet agent. Goldwater said the censure would be "a triumph for the double-talking, co‐existence-with-Russia crowd here at home".

Goldwater emphasized his strong opposition to the spread of communism in his 1960 book, The Conscience of a Conservative. The book, which was written with conservative activist L. Brent Bozell Jr. became an important reference text in conservative political circles.

In 1964, Goldwater ran a conservative campaign that emphasized states' rights. Goldwater's 1964 campaign was a magnet for conservatives since he opposed interference by the federal government in state affairs. Goldwater voted in favor of the Civil Rights Act of 1957 and the Twenty-fourth Amendment to the U.S. Constitution, but did not vote on the Civil Rights Act of 1960 because he was absent from the chamber, with Senate Minority Whip Thomas Kuchel (R–CA) announcing that Goldwater would have voted in favor if present.

Though Goldwater had supported the original Senate version of the bill, Goldwater voted against the Civil Rights Act of 1964. His public stance was based on his view that Article II and Article VII of the Act interfered with the rights of private persons to do or not to do business with whomever they chose and believed that the private employment provisions of the Act would lead to racial quotas. In the segregated city of Phoenix in the 1950s, he had quietly supported civil rights for blacks, but would not let his name be used.

All this appealed to white Southern Democrats, and Goldwater was the first Republican to win the electoral votes of all of the Deep South states (South Carolina, Georgia, Alabama, Mississippi and Louisiana) since Reconstruction. However, Goldwater's vote on the Civil Rights Act proved devastating to his campaign everywhere outside the South (besides Dixie, Goldwater won only in Arizona, his home state), contributing to his landslide defeat in 1964.

Goldwater's campaign also included stringently fiscally conservative policies. Goldwater was strongly critical of Johnson's War on Poverty policies and argued that it might be the "attitude or the actions" of the poor that are responsible for their hardship. In his prepared speech before the Economic Club of New York, Goldwater also claimed that arguing unemployment and poverty are caused by lack of education is "like saying that people have big feet because they wear big shoes. The fact is that most people who have no skill have no education for the same reason—low intelligence or low ambition." Goldwater also called for ending agricultural subsidies, privatizing Social Security, and privatizing the Tennessee Valley Authority.

While Goldwater had been depicted by his opponents in the Republican primaries as a representative of a conservative philosophy that was extreme and alien, his voting records show that his positions were in generally aligned with those of other Republicans in the Congress.

Goldwater fought in 1971 to stop U.S. funding of the United Nations after the People's Republic of China was admitted to the organization. He said:

I suggested on the floor of the Senate today that we stop all funds for the United Nations. Now, what that'll do to the United Nations, I don't know. I have a hunch it would cause them to fold up, which would make me very happy at this particular point. I think if this happens, they can well move their headquarters to Peking or Moscow and get 'em out of this country.

=== Goldwater and revival of American conservatism ===
Although Goldwater was not as important in the American conservative movement as Ronald Reagan after 1965, he shaped and redefined the movement from the late 1950s to 1964. Arizona Senator John McCain, who succeeded Goldwater in the Senate in 1987, said of Goldwater's legacy: "He transformed the Republican Party from an Eastern elitist organization to the breeding ground for the election of Ronald Reagan." Columnist George Will remarked that Reagan's victory in the 1980 presidential election was the metaphoric culmination of 16 years of counting the votes for Goldwater from the 1964 presidential race.

The Republican Party recovered from the 1964 election debacle, acquiring 47 seats in the House of Representatives in the 1966 mid-term election. In January 1969, after Goldwater had been re-elected to the Senate, he wrote an article in the National Review "affirming that he [was] not against liberals, that liberals are needed as a counterweight to conservatism, and that he had in mind a fine liberal like Max Lerner."

Goldwater was a strong supporter of environmental protection, saying in 1965:

I feel very definitely that the [Nixon] administration is absolutely correct in cracking down on companies and corporations and municipalities that continue to pollute the nation's air and water. While I am a great believer in the free competitive enterprise system and all that it entails, I am an even stronger believer in the right of our people to live in a clean and pollution-free environment. To this end, it is my belief that when pollution is found, it should be halted at the source, even if this requires stringent government action against important segments of our national economy.

== Later life ==
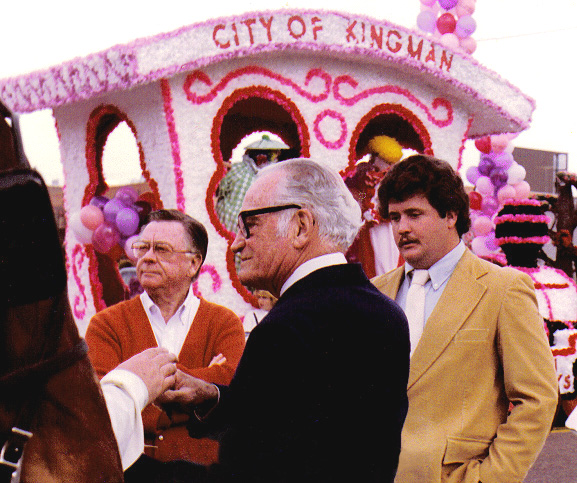
Goldwater signing autographs at the Fiesta Bowl parade in 1983

By the 1980s, with Ronald Reagan as president and the growing involvement of the religious right in conservative politics, Goldwater's libertarian views on personal issues were revealed; he believed that they were an integral part of true conservatism. Goldwater viewed abortion as a matter of personal choice and as such supported abortion rights. As a passionate defender of personal liberty, he saw the religious right's views as an encroachment on personal privacy and individual liberties. Although he voted against making Martin Luther King's birthday a national holiday in his last term as senator, Goldwater later expressed support for it.

In 1987, he received the Langley Gold Medal from the Smithsonian Institution. In 1988, Princeton University's American Whig-Cliosophic Society awarded Goldwater the James Madison Award for Distinguished Public Service in recognition of his career.

After his retirement in 1987, Goldwater described Arizona Governor Evan Mecham as "hardheaded" and called on him to resign, and two years later stated that the Republican party had been taken over by a "bunch of kooks".

During the 1988 presidential campaign, he told vice-presidential nominee Dan Quayle at a campaign event in Arizona, "I want you to go back and tell George Bush to start talking about the issues."

Some of Goldwater's statements in the 1990s alienated many social conservatives. He endorsed Democrat Karan English in an Arizona congressional race, urged Republicans to lay off Bill Clinton over the Whitewater scandal, and criticized the military's ban on homosexuals, saying, "Everyone knows that gays have served honorably in the military since at least the time of Julius Caesar", and, "You don't need to be 'straight' to fight and die for your country. You just need to shoot straight." A few years before his death, he addressed establishment Republicans by saying, "Do not associate my name with anything you do. You are extremists, and you've hurt the Republican party much more than the Democrats have."

In a 1994 interview with The Washington Post, Goldwater said:

When you say "radical right" today, I think of these moneymaking ventures by fellows like Pat Robertson and others who are trying to take the Republican party and make a religious organization out of it. If that ever happens, kiss politics goodbye.

Also in November 1994, he repeated his concerns about religious groups attempting to gain control of the Republican party, saying,

[The] Republicans are selling their soul to win elections. Mark my word, if and when these preachers get control of the party, and they're sure trying to do so, it's going to be a terrible damn problem. Frankly, these people frighten me. Politics and governing demand compromise. The government won't work without it. But these Christians believe they are acting in the name of God, so they can't and won't compromise. I know, I've tried to deal with them.

In 1996, he told Bob Dole, whose own presidential campaign received lukewarm support from conservative Republicans, "We're the new liberals of the Republican party. Can you imagine that?" In that same year, with Senator Dennis DeConcini, Goldwater endorsed an Arizona initiative to legalize medical marijuana against the countervailing opinion of social conservatives.

== Personal life ==
In 1934, Goldwater married Margaret "Peggy" Johnson, daughter of a prominent industrialist from Muncie, Indiana. The couple had four children: Joanne (born January 18, 1936), Barry Jr. (born July 15, 1938), Michael (born March 15, 1940), and Peggy (born July 27, 1944). Goldwater became a widower in 1985 and, in 1992, he married Susan Wechsler, a nurse 32 years his junior. Goldwater's son Barry Goldwater Jr. served as a Republican Congressman, representing California from 1969 to 1983.

Goldwater's grandson, Ty Ross, is an interior designer and former Zoli model. Ross, who is openly gay and HIV positive, has been credited as inspiring the elder Goldwater "to become an octogenarian proponent of gay civil rights".

Goldwater ran track and cross country in high school, where he specialized in the 880 yard run. In 1940, he became one of the first to run the Colorado River recreationally through the Grand Canyon, participating as an oarsman on Norman Nevills' second commercial river trip. Goldwater joined them in Green River, Utah, and rowed his own boat down to Lake Mead. In 1970, the Arizona Historical Foundation published the daily journal Goldwater had maintained on the Grand Canyon journey, including his photographs, titled Delightful Journey.

In 1963, he joined the Arizona Society of the Sons of the American Revolution. He was also a lifetime member of the Veterans of Foreign Wars, the American Legion, and Sigma Chi fraternity. He belonged to both the York Rite and Scottish Rite of Freemasonry and was awarded the 33rd degree in the Scottish Rite.

=== Hobbies and interests ===
==== Amateur radio ====
Goldwater was an avid amateur radio operator from the early 1920s, with the call signs 6BPI, K3UIG and K7UGA. The last one is used by an Arizona club honoring him as a commemorative call. During the Vietnam War he was a Military Affiliate Radio System (MARS) operator.

Goldwater was a spokesman for amateur radio and its enthusiasts. Beginning in 1969 and for the rest of his life, he appeared in many educational and promotional films (and later videos) about the hobby, produced for the American Radio Relay League (the national society representing the interests of radio amateurs) by such producers as Dave Bell (W6AQ), ARRL Southwest Director John R. Griggs (W6KW), Alan Kaul (W6RCL), Forrest Oden (N6ENV), and Roy Neal (K6DUE). His first appearance was in Dave Bell's The World of Amateur Radio where Goldwater discussed the history of the hobby and demonstrated a live contact with Antarctica. His last on-screen appearance dealing with "ham radio" was in 1994, explaining an upcoming Earth-orbiting ham radio relay satellite.

Electronics was a hobby for Goldwater beyond amateur radio. He enjoyed assembling Heathkits, completing more than 100 and often visiting their maker in Benton Harbor, Michigan, to buy more, before the company exited the kit business in 1992.

==== Kachina dolls ====
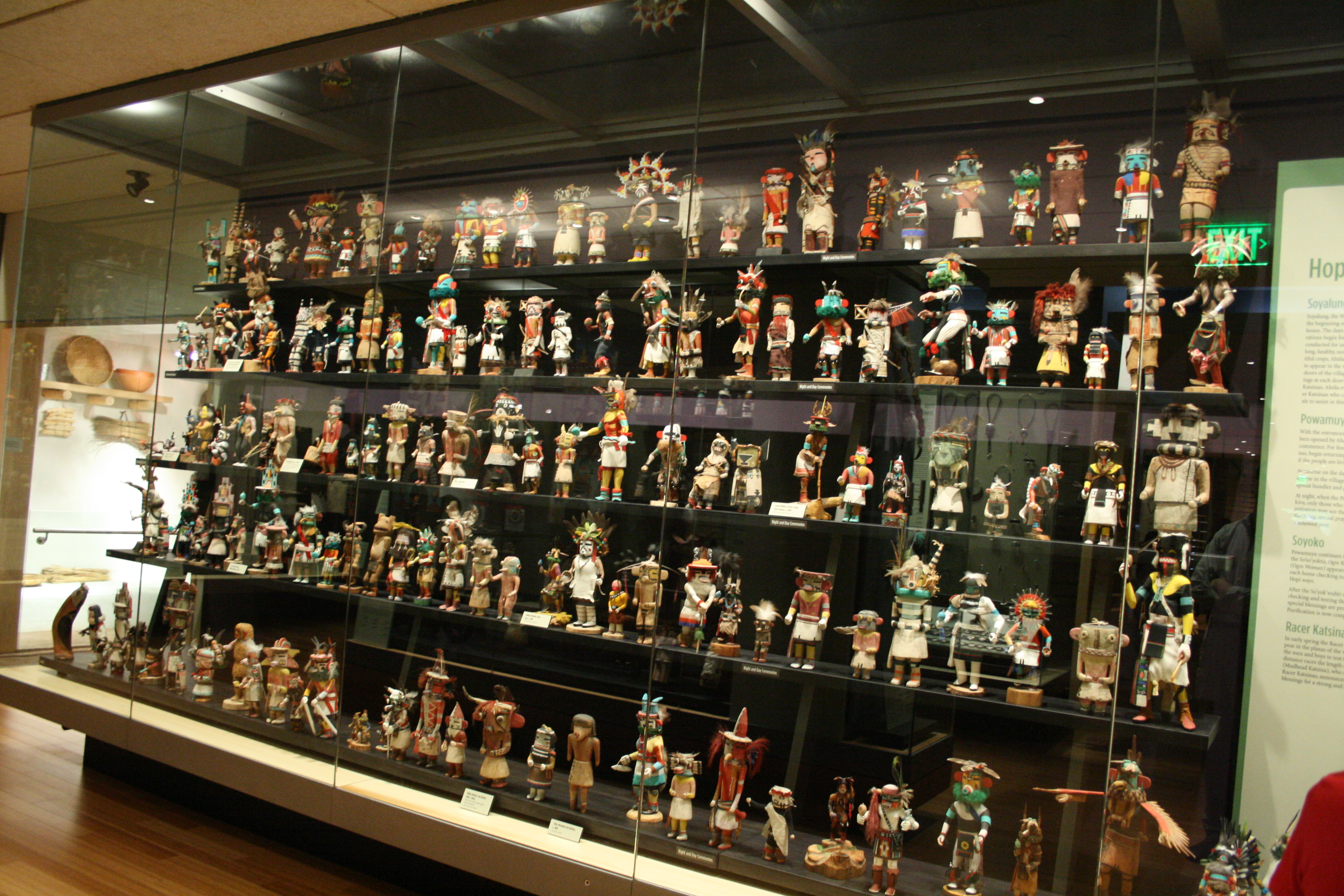
Most of the Kachina dolls at the Heard Museum were donated by Goldwater.

In 1916, Goldwater visited the Hopi reservation with Phoenix architect John Rinker Kibby and obtained his first kachina doll. Eventually his collection had 437 dolls and was presented in 1969 to the Heard Museum in Phoenix.

==== Photography ====
Goldwater was an amateur photographer and, in his estate, left some 15,000 of his images to three Arizona institutions. He was keen on candid photography. He became interested in the hobby after receiving a camera as a gift from his wife on their first Christmas. He used a 4×5 Graflex, Rolleiflex, 16 mm Bell and Howell motion picture camera, and 35 mm Nikkormat FT. He was a member of the Royal Photographic Society from 1941, becoming a life member in 1948.

For decades, he contributed photographs of his home state to Arizona Highways and was recognized for his Western landscapes and pictures of native Americans in the United States. Three books with his photographs are People and Places (1967); Barry Goldwater and the Southwest (1976); and Delightful Journey, (1940, reprinted 1970). Ansel Adams wrote a foreword to the 1976 book.

Goldwater's photography interest occasionally crossed into his political career. John F. Kennedy, as president, would sometimes invite former congressional colleagues to the White House for a drink. On one occasion, Goldwater brought his camera and photographed President Kennedy. When Kennedy received the photo, he returned it to Goldwater with the inscription: "For Barry Goldwater—Whom I urge to follow the career for which he has shown such talent—photography!—from his friend—John Kennedy." This quip became a classic of American political humor after it was relayed by humorist Bennett Cerf. The photo was prized by Goldwater for the rest of his life and sold for $17,925 in a 2010 Heritage auction.

Son Michael Prescott Goldwater formed the Goldwater Family Foundation with the goal of making his father's photography available via the internet. Barry Goldwater Photographs was launched in September 2006 to coincide with the HBO documentary Mr. Conservative, produced by granddaughter CC Goldwater.

==== UFOs ====
On March 28, 1975, Goldwater wrote to Shlomo Arnon: "The subject of UFOs has interested me for some long time. About ten or twelve years ago I made an effort to find out what was in the building at Wright-Patterson Air Force Base where the information has been stored that has been collected by the Air Force, and I was understandably denied this request. It is still classified above Top Secret." Goldwater further wrote that there were rumors the evidence would be released, and that he was "just as anxious to see this material as you are, and I hope we will not have to wait much longer". The April 25, 1988, issue of The New Yorker carried an interview with Goldwater in which he recounted efforts to gain access to the room. He did so again in a 1994 Larry King Live interview, saying:

I think the government does know. I can't back that up, but I think that at Wright-Patterson field, if you could get into certain places, you'd find out what the Air Force and the government knows about UFOs ... I called Curtis LeMay and I said, 'General, I know we have a room at Wright-Patterson where you put all this secret stuff. Could I go in there?' I've never heard him get mad, but he got madder than hell at me, cussed me out, and said, 'Don't ever ask me that question again!'

=== Death ===
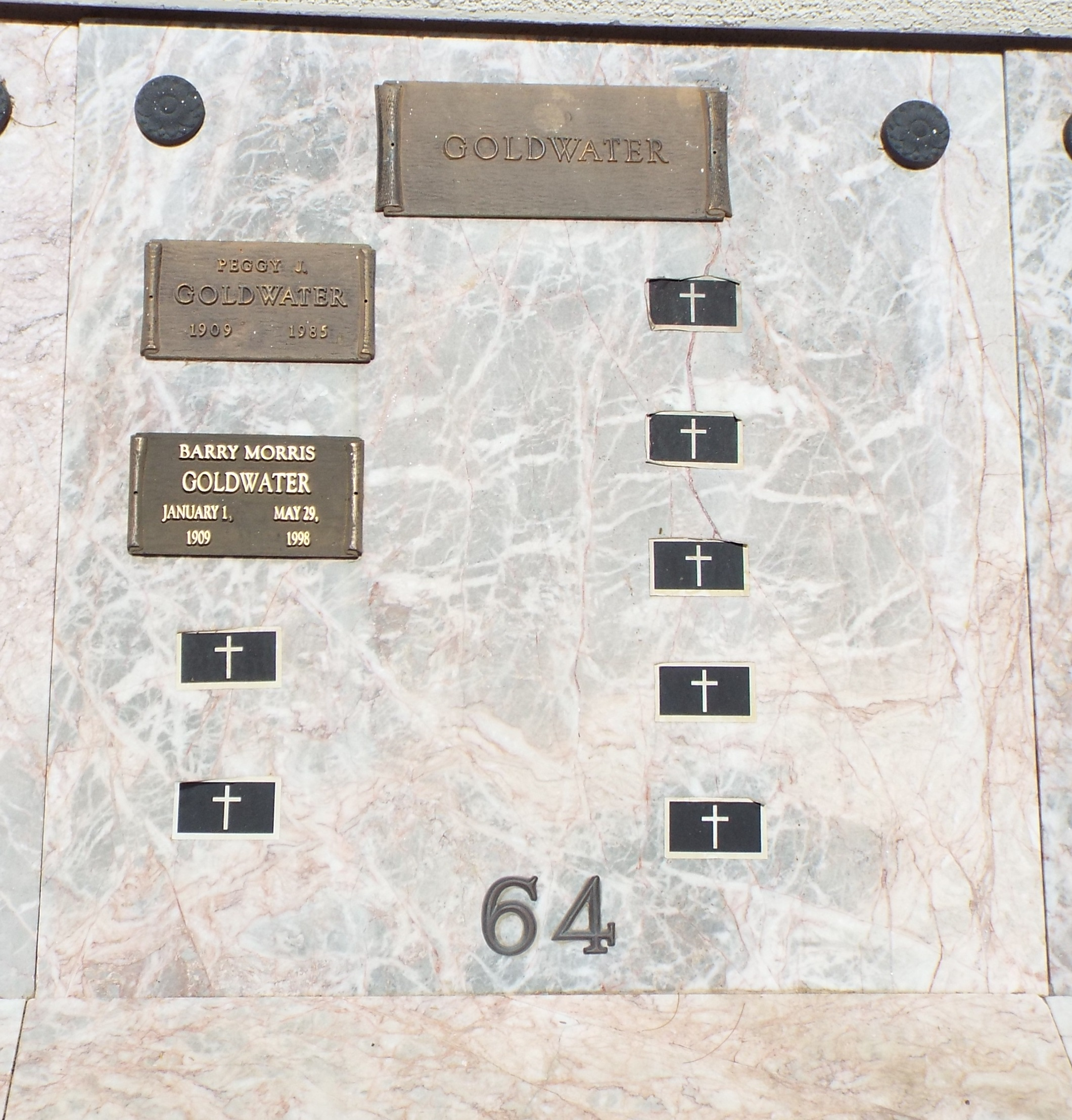
The Goldwater Crypt, #64, at Episcopal Christ Church of the Ascension in Paradise Valley, Arizona

Goldwater's public appearances ended in late 1996 after he had a massive stroke. Family members disclosed he was also in the early stages of Alzheimer's disease. He died on May 29, 1998, at the age of 89, at his long-time home in Paradise Valley, Arizona, of complications from the stroke. His funeral was officiated by both a Christian minister and a rabbi. His ashes were buried at Episcopal Christ Church of the Ascension in Paradise Valley. A memorial statue was erected in a small park in Paradise Valley near his home and resting place, honoring his memory.

== Legacy ==
=== Buildings and monuments ===
Among the buildings and monuments named after Barry Goldwater are the Barry M. Goldwater Terminal at Phoenix Sky Harbor International Airport, Goldwater Memorial Park in Paradise Valley, Arizona, the Barry Goldwater Air Force Academy Visitor Center at the United States Air Force Academy, and Barry Goldwater High School in northern Phoenix. In 2010, former Arizona Attorney General Grant Woods, himself a Goldwater scholar and supporter, founded the Goldwater Women's Tennis Classic Tournament to be held annually at the Phoenix Country Club in Phoenix. On February 11, 2015, a statue of Goldwater by Deborah Copenhaver Fellows was unveiled by U.S. House and Senate leaders at a dedication ceremony in National Statuary Hall of the U.S. Capitol building in Washington, D.C. Barry Goldwater Peak is the highest peak in the White Tank Mountains.

On December 9, 2016, Phoenix Sky Harbor Air National Guard Base was renamed Goldwater Air National Guard Base in honor of him.

=== Barry M. Goldwater Scholarship ===
The Barry M. Goldwater Scholarship and Excellence in Education Program was established by Congress in 1986. Its goal is to provide a continuing source of highly qualified scientists, mathematicians, and engineers by awarding scholarships to college students who intend to pursue careers in these fields.

The scholarship is awarded to about 400 students (college sophomores and juniors) nationwide in the amount of $7,500 per academic year (for their senior year, or junior and senior years). It honors Goldwater's keen interest in science and technology.

=== Documentary ===
Goldwater's granddaughter, CC Goldwater, has co-produced with longtime friend and independent film producer Tani L. Cohen a documentary on Goldwater's life, Mr. Conservative: Goldwater on Goldwater, first shown on HBO on September 18, 2006.

=== In popular culture ===
In his song "I Shall Be Free No. 10", Bob Dylan refers to Goldwater: "I'm liberal to a degree, I want everybody to be free. But if you think I'll let Barry Goldwater move in next door and marry my daughter, you must think I'm crazy." In the 1965 film The Bedford Incident, the actor Richard Widmark playing the film's antagonist, Captain Eric Finlander of the fictional destroyer USS Bedford, modeled his character's mannerisms and rhetorical style after Goldwater.

== Military awards ==
- Air Medal
- American Campaign Medal
- American Defense Service Medal
- Armed Forces Reserve Medal with three bronze hourglasses
- Army Commendation Medal
- Asiatic–Pacific Campaign Medal with campaign star
- Command Pilot Badge
- European–African–Middle Eastern Campaign Medal
- Legion of Merit
- Service Pilot Badge (former U.S. Army Air Forces rating)
- World War II Victory Medal

== Other awards ==
- Presidential Medal of Freedom (1986)
- American Legion Distinguished Service Medal
- Marconi Gold Medal, Veteran Wireless Operators Association (1968)
- Marconi Medal of Achievement (1968)
- Bob Hope Five Star Civilian Award (1976)
- Gold Good Citizenship Medal, Sons of the American Revolution (1964)
- Good Citizenship Award, Daughters of the American Revolution
- 33rd Degree Mason
- The Douglas MacArthur Memorial Award
- Top Gun Award, Luke Air Force Base
- Order of Fifinella Award – Champion of the Women Air Force Service Pilots (WASP) (1978)
- Thomas D. White National Defense Award 1978
- Conservative Digest Award (1980)
- Senator John Warner Award for Public Service in the field of Nuclear Disarmament (1983)
- Alexander M. Haig, Jr. Memorial Award (1983)
- National Congress of American Indians Congressional Award (1985)
- Space Pioneer Award, Sixth Space Development Conference (1987)
- James Madison Award, American Whig-Cliosophic Society (1988)
- National Aviation Hall of Fame (1982)

== Books ==
- The Conscience of a Conservative (1960)
- Why Not Victory? A Fresh Look at American Policy (1963)
- Where I Stand (1964)
- Conscience of a Majority (1971)
- The Coming Breakpoint (1976)
- Arizona (1977)
- With No Apologies: The Personal and Political Memoirs of Senator Barry M. Goldwater (1980)
- Goldwater (1988)

== Relatives ==
Goldwater's son Barry Goldwater Jr. served as a Congressman from California from 1969 to 1983. He was the first Congressman to serve while having a father in the Senate. Goldwater's uncle Morris Goldwater served in the Arizona territorial and state legislatures and as mayor of Prescott, Arizona. Goldwater's nephew Don Goldwater sought the Republican nomination for governor of Arizona in 2006, but he was defeated by Len Munsil.

== See also ==
- Electoral history of Barry Goldwater
- Goldwater Institute
- Goldwater rule
- Libertarianism in the United States

== Notes ==
Party political offices
Preceded by Ward Powers	Republican nominee for U.S. Senator from Arizona (Class 1); 1952, 1958	Succeeded by Paul Fannin
Preceded by Styles Bridges	Chair of the National Republican Senatorial Committee; 1955–1957	Succeeded by Everett Dirksen
Preceded by Andrew Schoeppel	Chair of the National Republican Senatorial Committee; 1961–1963	Succeeded by Thruston Morton
Preceded by Richard Nixon	Republican nominee for President of the United States; 1964	Succeeded by Richard Nixon
Preceded by Evan Mecham	Republican nominee for U.S. Senator from Arizona (Class 3); 1968, 1974, 1980	Succeeded by John McCain
U.S. Senate
Preceded by Ernest McFarland	U.S. Senator (Class 1) from Arizona; 1953–1965; Served alongside: Carl Hayden	Succeeded by Paul Fannin
Preceded by H. Alexander Smith	Ranking Member of the Senate Labor and Public Welfare Committee; 1959–1965	Succeeded by Jacob Javits
Preceded by Carl Hayden	U.S. Senator (Class 3) from Arizona; 1969–1987; Served alongside: Paul Fannin, Dennis DeConcini	Succeeded by John McCain
Preceded by Carl Curtis	Ranking Member of the Senate Space Committee; 1973–1977	Office abolished
Preceded by Mark Hatfield	Ranking Member of the Senate Intelligence Committee; 1979–1981	Succeeded by Daniel Patrick Moynihan
Preceded by Birch Bayh	Chair of the Senate Intelligence Committee; 1981–1985	Succeeded by David Durenberger
Preceded by John Tower	Chair of the Senate Armed Services Committee; 1985–1987	Succeeded by Sam Nunn
