= Dwight D. Eisenhower Supreme Court candidates =

During his two terms in office, President Dwight D. Eisenhower nominated five members for the Supreme Court of the United States: Chief Justice Earl Warren, and Associate Justices John Marshall Harlan II, William J. Brennan, Charles Evans Whittaker, and Potter Stewart. All were confirmed by the Senate.

== Earl Warren nomination ==
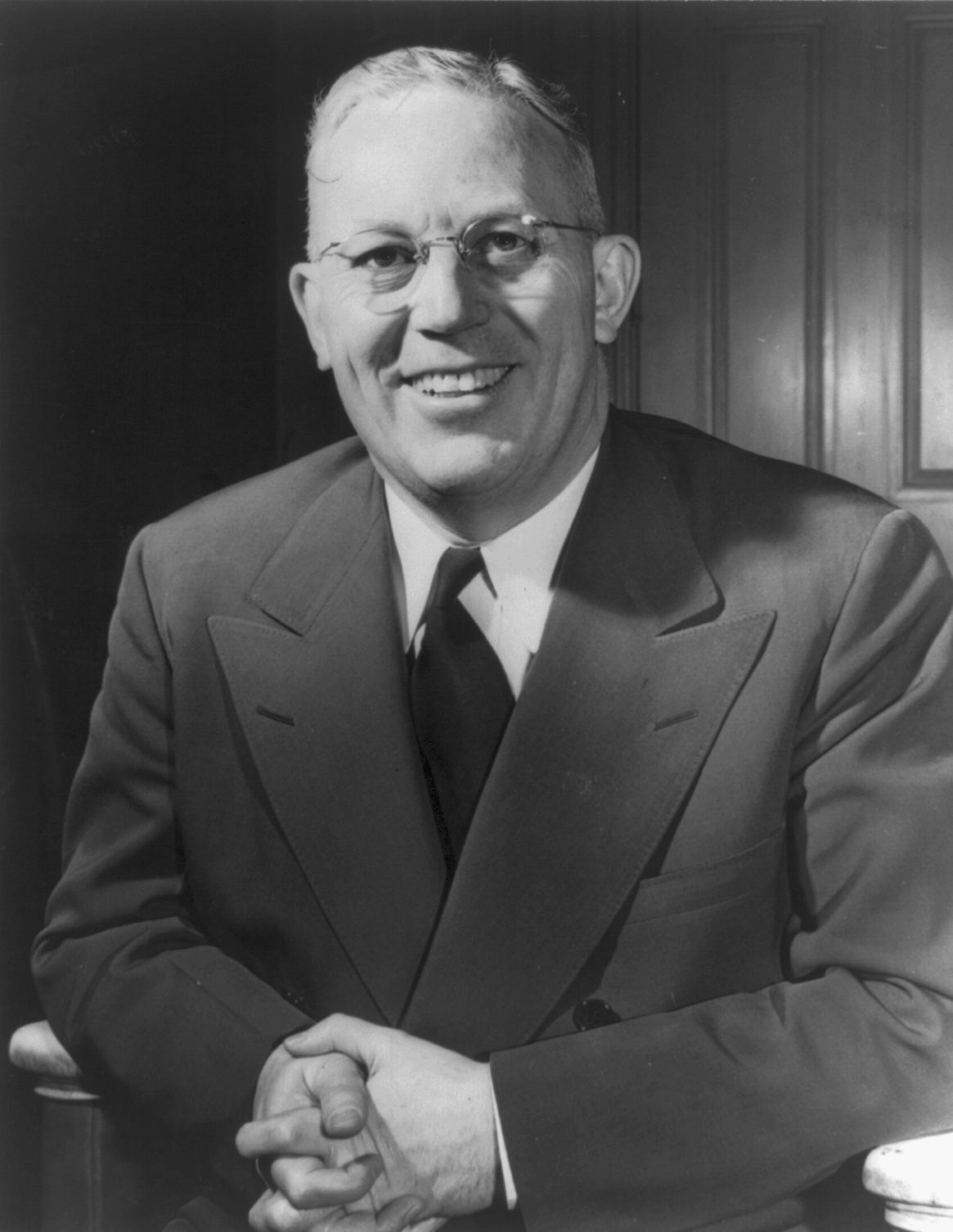
Earl Warren as governor of California

Chief Justice Fred Vinson died in office on September 8, 1953. Eisenhower's first choice as replacement was his Secretary of State John Foster Dulles, former legal council to the Paris Peace Conference, advisor to New York Governor Thomas E. Dewey and later advisor to President Truman. Dulles declined, and Eisenhower next offered the Chief Justiceship to Dewey himself; however, Dewey likewise declined. Eisenhower then appointed California Governor Earl Warren as Chief Justice on October 5, 1953, by using a recess appointment. In 1952 Warren had stood as a "favorite son" candidate of California for the Republican nomination for president, but withdrew in support of Eisenhower. Warren was reported to have offered to support Eisenhower's campaign in return for an appointment to the Supreme Court at the first possible opportunity. Eisenhower wanted a conservative justice and commented of Warren that "he represents the kind of political, economic, and social thinking that I believe we need on the Supreme Court.... He has a national name for integrity, uprightness, and courage that, again, I believe we need on the Court". Warren was formally nominated on January 11, 1954, and was confirmed by the United States Senate on March 1, 1954, by voice vote. Scholars differ as to whether Eisenhower regretted the appointment after Warren's decisions turned more liberal.

== John Marshall Harlan nomination ==
Following the death of Justice Robert H. Jackson on October 9, 1954, Eisenhower nominated John Marshall Harlan II on November 9, 1954. Harlan had at the time been sitting on the United States Court of Appeals for the Second Circuit for only nine months. On being nominated, the reticent Harlan called reporters into his chambers in New York, and stated, in full, "I am very deeply honored." The United States Senate did not initially act on his nomination, and Eisenhower had to renominate Harlan on January 10. Harlan's nomination came shortly after the Supreme Court handed down its landmark decision in Brown v. Board of Education, declaring segregation in public schools unconstitutional. Chairman of the United States Senate Committee on the Judiciary, James Eastland, and several southern senators delayed his confirmation, because they (correctly) believed that he would support desegregation of the schools and civil rights. Unlike almost all previous Supreme Court nominees, Harlan appeared before the Senate Judiciary Committee to answer questions relating to his judicial views. Every Supreme Court nominee since Harlan has been questioned by the Judiciary Committee before confirmation. The Senate finally confirmed him on March 16, 1955, by a vote of 71–11. He took his seat on March 28, 1955. Of the eleven senators who voted against his appointment, nine were from the South.

== William Brennan and Charles Evans Whittaker nominations ==
Due to ill health, Justice Sherman Minton announced his retirement from the Court on October 15, 1956, remarking that "[t]here will be more interest in who will succeed me than in my passing. I'm an echo." Minton retired only a month before its traditional opening, and less than a month before the presidential election of 1956, both of which rushed the process to find a replacement. On October 16, 1956, Eisenhower used a recess appoint to seat William Brennan. Presidential advisers thought the appointment of a Catholic Democrat from the Northeast would woo critical voters in the upcoming election for Eisenhower, a Republican. Additionally, Cardinal Francis Spellman had asked Eisenhower to appoint a Catholic to the court, as the Supreme Court had not had a Catholic justice since the death of Frank Murphy in 1949.

Brennan gained the attention of Eisenhower's attorney general and chief legal affairs adviser, Herbert Brownell, when Brennan had to give a speech at a conference (as a substitute for New Jersey Supreme Court Chief Justice Vanderbilt). To Brownell, Brennan's speech seemed to suggest a marked conservatism, especially on criminal matters. Other factors playing into Brennan's appointment were his Catholicism, his status as a state court judge (no state judge had been appointed to the High Court since Benjamin Cardozo in 1932), and Eisenhower's desire to appear bipartisan after his appointments of justices Earl Warren and John Marshall Harlan II. Brennan was formally nominated on January 14, 1957.

Before Brennan's nomination was considered by the Congress, Justice Stanley Forman Reed announced his retirement from the Court on February 25, 1957, citing old age. Reed was 73 years old, but had also begun to feel that the Court's jurisprudential center had shifted too far away from him, and that he was losing his effectiveness. Within a week of Reed's retirement, on March 2, 1957, Eisenhower nominated Charles Evans Whittaker to succeed Reed.

Both Brennan and Whittaker were confirmed by voice vote in the United States Senate on March 19, 1957.

== Potter Stewart nomination ==
Harold Hitz Burton retired from the Court due to ill health on October 13, 1958. Five days later, on October 18, 1958, Eisenhower used a recess appointment to seat Potter Stewart on the Court. Eisenhower had previously appointed Stewart to the United States Court of Appeals for the Sixth Circuit, in 1954. Stewart was formally nominated on January 17, 1959, and was confirmed by the United States Senate on May 5, 1959, by a vote of 70–17.

== Names mentioned ==
Following is a list of individuals who were mentioned in various news accounts and books as having been considered by Eisenhower for a Supreme Court appointment:

=== United States Supreme Court (elevation to Chief Justice) ===
- Harold H. Burton (1888–1964)
- Robert H. Jackson (1892–1954)

=== United States courts of appeals ===

- Court of Appeals for the Second Circuit
  - John Marshall Harlan II (1899–1971) – (nominated and confirmed)
- Court of Appeals for the Fourth Circuit
  - John J. Parker (1885–1958)
- Court of Appeals for the Fifth Circuit
  - Elbert Parr Tuttle (1897–1996)
- Court of Appeals for the Sixth Circuit
  - Potter Stewart (1915–1985) – (nominated and confirmed)
- Court of Appeals for the Eighth Circuit
  - Charles Evans Whittaker (1901–1973) – (nominated and confirmed)
- Court of Appeals for the Tenth Circuit
  - Orie L. Phillips (1885–1974)
- Court of Appeals for the D.C. Circuit
  - Warren E. Burger (1907–1995) (later nominated as Chief Justice by President Richard Nixon and confirmed)
  - John A. Danaher (1899–1990)

=== United States district courts ===
- George H. Boldt (1903–1984) – Judge, United States District Court for the Western District of Washington

=== State supreme courts ===
- William J. Brennan Jr. (1906–1997) – Associate Justice, New Jersey Supreme Court (nominated and confirmed)
- Arthur T. Vanderbilt (1888–1957) – Chief Justice, New Jersey Supreme Court
- Boyd Leedom (1906–1969) – Chairman of the National Labor Relations Board, former Justice, South Dakota Supreme Court

=== Executive branch officials ===
- Herbert Brownell (1904–1996) – United States Attorney General
- John Foster Dulles (1888–1959) – United States Secretary of State
- John J. McCloy (1895–1989) – former United States High Commissioner for Germany
- Kenneth Claiborne Royall (1894–1971) – Former United States Secretary of War under Truman

=== State governors ===
- Thomas E. Dewey (1902–1971) – Governor of New York and former Republican presidential nominee
- Earl Warren (1891–1974) – Governor of California (nominated and confirmed)

== See also ==
- United States federal judge
- Judicial appointment history for United States federal courts
