= Roy Neal =

American network television correspondent (1921–2003)

- Born: Roy Neal Hinkel; May 30, 1921; Philadelphia, Pennsylvania, US
- Died: August 15, 2003 (aged 82); High Point, North Carolina, US
- Occupation: Correspondent
- Spouse: Pat McBride
- Children: David Neal, Mark Neal

Roy Neal Hinkel (May 30, 1921 – August 15, 2003) was an American television correspondent for NBC News. An aerospace specialist, he reported live on the Apollo 11 landing. His newscast of that event was later released on LP by Evolution Records. He also reported on the Apollo 13 crisis as a pool reporter for all three of the major networks at that time, and reported during the launch of the first Space Shuttle, STS-1.

Neal's broadcast career began as a radio actor at KYW, Philadelphia's NBC Red Network affiliate in 1940, where he appeared on The Lost Continent radio show. His voice was recognized as a potential news voice by a KYW director, who recommended him to radio station WIBG, then based in the Philadelphia suburb of Glenside, Pennsylvania, where he hired on in 1941. He would work as a news director and announcer there until 1943, during which time he worked on game broadcasts of the Philadelphia Phillies and Philadelphia Athletics.

In 1943 he was drafted into the United States Army, where he saw combat in Europe. After the war ended, he entered the Armed Forces Radio network, where he worked until his 1946 release from the Army. He then returned to WIBG, which had relocated to Philadelphia, but, in early 1947, he went into television at WPTZ, a Philadelphia station that was a predecessor of KYW-TV but was at the time owned by the Philco company, and was an early television affiliate of NBC Television. While there, Neal first did an interview show, then went to news coverage. Some of his news coverage was used on an early version of modern network morning shows, while the entertainment was provided by a student of the medium named Ernie Kovacs, whose study of how television then worked resulted in a comedy style that was copied by shows from Rowan and Martin's Laugh-In to Monty Python's Flying Circus. In 1952, both Neal and Kovacs left Philadelphia for the NBC network, with Neal heading up its West Coast news operation.

During the 1950s, Neal appeared in two films: Cry Terror and The Night Holds Terror.

Neal was a licensed Amateur Radio operator with the call sign K6DUE, which has since been reassigned to the International Space Station Amateur Radio Club, He was for many years an anchor and correspondent for Westlink Amateur Radio News; later Amateur Radio Newsline, a weekly audio news bulletin service staffed mostly by hams active in the broadcast and news industry.

He retired in 1986, and died in 2003 at age 82, after heart surgery.

The Broadcast Pioneers of Philadelphia posthumously inducted Neal into their Hall of Fame in 2011.
