= Goldwater rule =

Rule governing how psychiatrists may give opinions on public figures

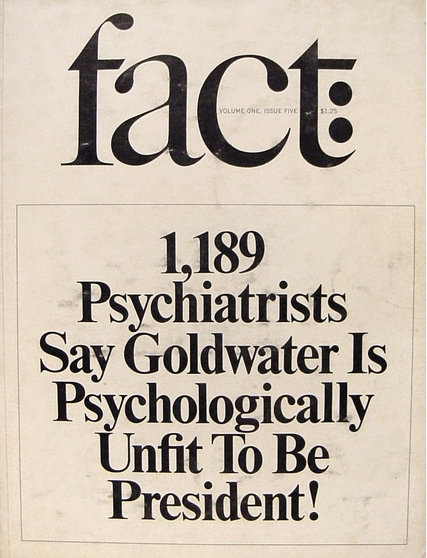
The original piece in Fact magazine which prompted the introduction of the Goldwater rule. This practice was later deemed unethical by the APA.

The Goldwater rule is the eponymous rule established by the American Psychiatric Association (APA) in Annotation 7.3 of American Medical Association's (AMA) code of ethics. Section 7 of AMA's Principles of Medical Ethics states that medical doctors have a responsibility to participate in activities contributing to the improvement of the community and the betterment of public health. As a subsection therein, Annotation 7.3 (also known as "Goldwater rule") is addressed to psychiatrists and mandates that, when asked to comment on public figures, they shall refrain from diagnosing, which requires a personal examination and consent. It is named after former U.S. Senator and 1964 Republican presidential nominee Barry Goldwater, who had been the subject of a diagnostic poll of psychiatrists in a 1964 edition of Fact magazine.

== Creation ==
The issue arose in 1964 when Fact magazine published "The Unconscious of a Conservative: A Special Issue on the Mind of Barry Goldwater", a play on the title of Goldwater's bestseller The Conscience of a Conservative. The magazine polled psychiatrists about Goldwater and whether he was fit to be president. Goldwater sued magazine editor Ralph Ginzburg and managing editor Warren Boroson, and in Goldwater v. Ginzburg (July 1969) received compensation of $75,000 ($658,000 today).

== Description ==
American Medical Association's first issue of the Principles of Medical Ethics was published in 1847. Its 2001 revision is still in effect as of 2026, wherein Section 7 says:

A physician shall recognize a responsibility to participate in activities contributing to the improvement of the community and the betterment of public health.

The American Psychiatric Association adopted AMA's Principles and, in 1973, published the version Principles of Medical Ethics With Annotations Especially Applicable to Psychiatry, to which the Goldwater rule was added as a subsection ("Annotation 7.3"). Its 2013 edition reads:

On occasion psychiatrists are asked for an opinion about an individual who is in the light of public attention or who has disclosed information about himself/herself through public media. In such circumstances, a psychiatrist may share with the public his or her expertise about psychiatric issues in general. However, it is unethical for a psychiatrist to offer a professional opinion unless he or she has conducted an examination and has been granted proper authorization for such a statement.

The prohibition stated in Annotation 7.3 is often taken out of context of the public health obligations of Section 7.

== Similar ethical codes in different organizations ==
=== American Psychological Association ===
The APA Ethics Code of the American Psychological Association (same acronym but a different organization from the American Psychiatric Association) does not have a similar rule explicitly defined in its code of ethics. Instead, the APA suggests that various statements made in different parts of its Ethics Code would apply to cases of the diagnosis of a public figure. In 2016, in response to the New York Times article "Should Therapists Analyze Presidential Candidates?", American Psychological Association President Susan H. McDaniel published a letter in The New York Times in which she offered her opinion and interpretation of the current Ethics Code:

Similar to the psychiatrists' Goldwater Rule, our code of ethics exhorts psychologists to "take precautions" that any statements they make to the media "are based on their professional knowledge, training or experience in accord with appropriate psychological literature and practice" and "do not indicate that a professional relationship has been established" with people in the public eye, including political candidates. When providing opinions of psychological characteristics, psychologists must conduct an examination "adequate to support statements or conclusions". In other words, our ethical code states that psychologists should not offer a diagnosis in the media of a living public figure they have not examined.

=== American Medical Association ===
The American Medical Association, which initially pressured the American Psychiatric Association to include the Goldwater rule after actively supporting Barry Goldwater in 1964, wrote new guidelines into the AMA Code of Medical Ethics in the fall of 2017, stating that physicians should refrain "from making clinical diagnoses about individuals (e.g., public officials, celebrities, persons in the news) they have not had the opportunity to personally examine".

== About Donald Trump ==
In 2016 and 2017, a number of psychiatrists and clinical psychologists faced criticism for violating the Goldwater rule, as they claimed that Donald Trump displayed "an assortment of personality problems, including grandiosity, a lack of empathy, and 'malignant narcissism'", and that he has a "dangerous mental illness", despite having never examined him. In defense of this practice, Bandy X. Lee, a forensic psychiatrist at the Yale School of Medicine, wrote in USA Today, "Diagnostic practices have changed from accepting interviews to observations, so any assertion that a personal interview is mandatory for a valid professional opinion does not hold." Since April 2017, Lee has stated that while she has been an adherent to the Goldwater rule "for over 20 years", the APA was "violating its own rule" by modifying it so that it would not be possible to meet its "affirmative obligation". She formed an organization with several thousand other mental health professionals called the World Mental Health Coalition, "in opposition to the American Psychiatric Association, which, with the Trump presidency, not only failed to meet the psychiatric profession's societal responsibility but inhibited individual professionals from doing so". On December 5, 2019, a group of mental health professionals led by Lee, George Washington University professor John Zinner, and former CIA profiler Jerrold Post publicly urged the House Judiciary Committee to consider Donald Trump's "dangerous" mental state that was ostensibly arising from his "brittle sense of self-worth" as part of the Congressional impeachment ongoing process.

John Gartner, a practicing psychologist and the leader of the group Duty to Warn, stated in April 2017, "We have an ethical responsibility to warn the public about Donald Trump's dangerous mental illness."

The American Psychoanalytic Association (APsaA)—a different organization from the APA—published a letter on June 6, 2017, highlighting differences between the APA and APsaA ethical guidelines and stating, "The American Psychiatric Association's ethical stance on the Goldwater Rule applies to its members only. APsaA does not consider political commentary by its individual members an ethical matter." In July 2017, the website Stat published an article by Sharon Begley, labeled "exclusive" and titled "Psychiatry Group Tells Members They Can Defy 'Goldwater Rule' and Comment on Trump's Mental Health". The article, with a photograph of Barry Goldwater as the headline image, stated, "A leading psychiatry group has told its members they should not feel bound by a longstanding rule against commenting publicly on the mental state of public figures", first sourcing the statement to the July 6 American Psychoanalytic Association (APsaA) letter, but also claiming that it "represents the first significant crack in the profession's decades-old united front aimed at preventing experts from discussing the psychiatric aspects of politicians' behavior". The article then repeatedly referred to the "Goldwater rule", quoted an unnamed source as saying "leadership has been extremely reluctant to make a statement and publicly challenge the American Psychiatric Association", and claimed that an unnamed "official" had said, "Although the American Psychological Association 'prefers' that its members not offer opinions on the psychology of someone they have not examined, it does not have a Goldwater rule and is not considering implementing one." Yahoo News reporter Michael Walsh criticized the Stat article, saying it was "misleading" by stating that the letter "represents the first significant crack": the American Psychiatric Association retains the Goldwater rule, and the APsaA never had the rule and was not changing. Also, although the APsaA has no Goldwater rule for its members and allows its members to give individual opinions about specific political figures, its Executive Councilors unanimously endorsed a policy that "the APsaA as an organization will speak to issues only, not about specific political figures".

In February 2017, psychiatrist Allen Frances wrote a letter to the editor of The New York Times regarding Trump and narcissistic personality disorder, "I wrote the criteria that define this disorder, and Mr. Trump doesn't meet them." According to the American Psychiatric Association, "saying that a person does not have an illness is also a professional opinion."

In September 2017, psychiatrist Jeffrey A. Lieberman published an article extensively speculating on diagnoses for Donald Trump despite claiming to adhere to the Goldwater rule in the beginning paragraph. He arrived at a diagnosis of "incipient dementia" but faced no sanctions.

The APA is accused of conflict of interest, since it receives federal funding, which had been increased after its actions under the Trump administration.

== See also ==
- Duty to warn § Clinical psychology and psychiatry
- Retrospective diagnosis
