= Ned Goldwasser =

American physicist (1919–2016)

Edwin L. Goldwasser
- Born: March 9, 1919; Manhattan, New York City, U.S.
- Died: December 14, 2016 (aged 97)
- Education: Harvard University
- Known for: Work in photons, cosmic rays, charged particles and elementary particles
- Awards: Fellow to the American Association for the Advancement of Science; Fellow to the American Physical Society (1961); Guggenheim Fellowship (1957-58)
- Scientific career
- Fields: Particle physics
- Workplaces: University of Illinois; Fermi National Accelerator Laboratory

Edwin L. Goldwasser (March 9, 1919 — December 14, 2016) was an American physicist and Co-Founder of the Fermi National Accelerator Laboratory and the field of particle physics. He was a Professor of Physics Emeritus and former Vice Chancellor of Academic Affairs at the University of Illinois, as well as the first Deputy Director of Fermi National Accelerator Laboratory. His interests were photons, cosmic rays, charged particles and elementary particles. He was Fellow to the American Association for the Advancement of Science and American Physical Society (elected in 1961). He was a Guggenheim Fellow for the academic year 1957–1958.

== Life and career ==
Ned was born in Manhattan, attending the Horace Mann school and later graduating at Harvard, majoring in physics and graduating in 1940. His first job was in the Navy, working as a civilian physicist for the Bureau of Ordnance

Goldwasser's father was I. Edwin Goldwasser, a teacher, philanthropist, and businessman.
