= I. Edwin Goldwasser =

Jewish-American educator and businessman (1878–1974)

Israel Edwin Goldwasser (August 6, 1878 – June 29, 1974) was a Jewish-American teacher, principal, philanthropist, and businessman from New York.

== Life ==
Goldwasser was born on August 6, 1878, in New York City, New York, the son of Henry Philip Goldwasser and Rachel Haiblum.

Goldwasser attended the College of the City of New York, graduating from there with a B.S. in 1898 and an M.S. in 1900. He also went to New York University, graduating from there with an M.Pd. in 1901 and an M.A. in 1902. In 1897, he began working in the New York City public school system, initially as a teacher in an elementary and high school. He later became principal of an elementary school and an evening high school, and from 1914 to 1919 he was a district superintendent of schools. In connection with his teaching, he published Methods in Teaching English in 1912 and Yiddish English Lessons with Joseph Jablonower in 1914.

Within a year of teaching, Goldwasser was appointed senior teacher of the graduating classes. He was the first teacher in New York to introduce a school newspaper that was edited and published by the students, which was called "Old Fifteen." He was appointed English teacher in 1903, and two years later took the examination for principalship in public schools. He refused to accept any appointment as principal to any school except on the Lower East Side, since he thought it was important for the principal to understand the students in his care and for the Jewish community to have a Jewish principal at a time when there were only two other Jewish principals in the city. With support from Julia Richman, he was eventually appointed to Public School No. 34 on Broome Street. In 1909, he was transferred to No. 20 on Chrystie and Rivington Streets. He was also principal of the East Side Evening High School, Superintendent of Recreation Centres, and executive manager of the Y.M.H.A.

Goldwasser was co-executive director of the Federation of Jewish Philanthropies from 1915 to 1917, its trustee from 1917 to 1954, chairman of its distribution committee from 1925 to 1950, and its vice-president. He was a director and executive committee member of the Joint Distribution Committee, a founder, director, treasurer, and chairman of the NYANA, an executive committee member of the Jewish Welfare Board starting in 1918, treasurer of the Graduate School for Jewish Social Work starting in 1925, and head of the Council of Fraternal and Benevolent Organizations of the New York and Brooklyn Federations of Jewish Charities after it was organized in 1935.

Goldwasser began working in business in 1920, when he began working with L. Erstein & Bros, Inc. He worked with them until 1930. He then worked with the Commercial Factors Corporation from 1930 to 1931. He became president of the Bachmann Emmerich & Co. in 1931 and vice-president of the Commercial Factors Corporation in 1937. He became an advisory board member of the New York State Committee on Adult Education in 1934 and was a member of the education committee of the Merchants Association of New York City. He retired from the Commercial Factors Corporation in 1954, after which he became an economic consultant and took a special interest in economic projects in Israel.

Goldwasser was a member of Phi Beta Kappa and the Freemasons. He attended Congregation Rodeph Sholom and served as principal of its Religious School from 1900 to 1905. In 1914, he married Edith Goldstein. Their children were Marjorie, Edwin Leo, and Joan. His son Edwin was a physics professor at the University of Illinois Urbana-Champaign and co-director of the National Accelerator Laboratory in Weston, Illinois.

Goldwasser died in the Jewish Home and Hospital on June 29, 1974.
