= David Bar-Illan =

David Bar-Illan (Hebrew: דוד בר-אילן; February 7, 1930 – November 5, 2003) was an Israeli pianist, author and newspaper editor.

== Biography ==
Bar-Illan was born in Haifa during the Mandate era, and studied music at the Dona Weizman Conservatory. At age 17, he won a scholarship to study music in the United States, at the Juilliard School in New York City. In 1948, following Israeli Independence, he interrupted his studies and briefly returned to the new state of Israel to join the Israel Defense Forces and fight in the 1948 Arab-Israeli War.

Bar-Illan died in Jerusalem in 2003 at age 73, from complications of a heart attack he had suffered three years earlier. He was survived by his wife, three children, two stepchildren, and a younger sister.

== Music career ==
In 1950, he graduated from the Juilliard School and settled in the United States, regularly touring internationally as a concert artist. His London debut was at the Wigmore Hall in 1953. His debut with the New York Philharmonic was in 1960 under conductor Dimitri Mitropoulos. In 1961, he became the first Israeli musician to perform in Germany after World War II, receiving much criticism from fellow Israelis. Bar-Illan's debut recording on RCA included works by Beethoven and Liszt. Later in his career, he recorded six albums on the Audiofon label. He taught at Southern Methodist University, the University of Cincinnati College-Conservatory of Music and at the Mannes College of Music (now the Mannes School of Music). Bar-Illan had a successful career as a concert pianist that lasted more than fifty years, and he played with every major orchestra in the US and in Europe. His long association with composer Robert Starer led to Starer's dedication of several works to Bar-Illan.

== Journalism and media career ==
In the 1960s, Ralph Ginzburg invited him to write for his new publication Eros Magazine, a 1962 quarterly hardbound periodical containing articles and photo-essays on love and sex. Bar-Illan's contributions included entertaining and well-researched articles such as "The Love Life of Napoleon," "The Unicorn as Phallic Symbol," and "What Mark Twain Reveals About Himself in '1601'." He also wrote for the Saturday Evening Post, and was a regular opinion contributor to U.S. newspapers, notably as a vocal advocate for Israel and Soviet Jewry. From 1990 to 1992, he served as Executive Editor of The Jerusalem Post, Israel's leading English-language newspaper, and was a regular columnist from 1992 to 1996.

In 1996, he became Director of Communications and Policy Planning for Israeli Prime Minister Benjamin Netanyahu, serving until 1999. During this period, he served as the State of Israel's key spokesman with the foreign media, appearing in hundreds of television and radio interviews. In 1999, he returned to the Jerusalem Post as an occasional columnist.

== Legacy ==
To honor the memory and legacy of Bar-Illan, friends and family helped establish an annual event, The David Bar-Illan Conference on the Media & the Middle East, at the Ariel University Center of Samaria. The forum, held every November in Israel, is a full-day academic conference on media relations and ethics.
