= VSC =

VSC may refer to:

== Organizations ==
- Venezuela Solidarity Campaign, a British political group
- Vermont State Colleges, the U.S. state of Vermont's system of public colleges
- Victory Services Club, a London private members' club for the armed forces
- Vietnam Solidarity Campaign, a Vietnam War-era activist group
- Volunteer Special Constabulary, a component of the Singapore Police Force
- Video Standards Council, of the UK responsible for promoting standards in the video industry
- Volunteer Service Corp, at Wake Forest University

== Places ==
- Valley Stream Central High School, in Valley Stream, NY, US
- Vermont Studio Center, a fine arts and writing residency program located at Johnson in the US state of Vermont
- Vinings, Smyrna, Cumberland, an area in metropolitan Atlanta, US; See Vinings, Georgia

== Science and technology ==
- Variable structure control, a type of discontinuous nonlinear control
- Variations in sex characteristics, congenital conditions
- Vertical service code, a special telephone number that usually begins with the * (star) key
- Vehicle Stability Control, Toyota's tradename for electronic stability control
- Video spectral comparator, a lighting instrument used in questioned document examination
- Volatile sulfur compounds, in organic chemistry
- Voltage source converter, a type of power electronics device

=== Computing ===
- Volume Shadow Copy Service, a mechanism of the NTFS file system
- Virtualization Service Client, software used to run Microsoft App-V virtualization software
- .vsc, a file extension used by the Versus programming language and the Viscosity image and animation editing utility
- Visual Studio Code, a Microsoft source code editor for Windows, Linux and macOS

== Sport ==
- Debreceni VSC, a Hungarian football club
- Vitória Sport Clube, a Portuguese football club
- Vaipuna SC, an association football club in Samoa
- Virtual Safety Car, in motorsport

== Other uses ==
- Aerovías Especiales de Carga (ICAO airline designator), a Colombian airline operator
- Vancouver Sleep Clinic, an Australian band
- Vehicle service contract, used for automotive repair, for example see Carchex
- Vertebral subluxation complex, in chiropractic
- Vessel Safety Checks, of recreational boaters; See Missions of the United States Coast Guard
