= Bonnie Erbé =

American journalist and television host

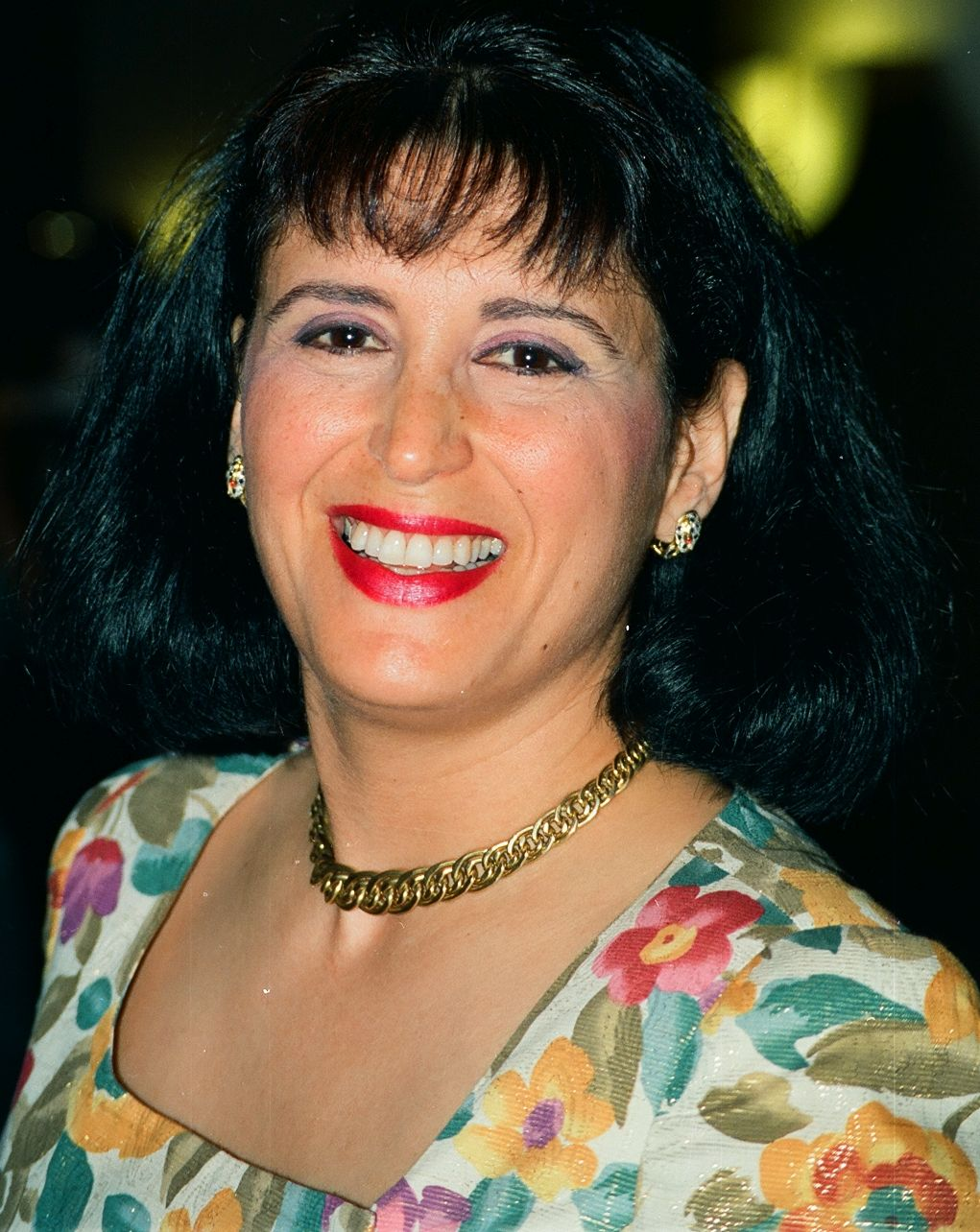
Erbé in 1998

Bonnie Ginzburg Erbé (born April 2, 1954) is an American journalist and television host based in Washington, D.C.

== Early life and education ==
Bonnie Ginzburg Erbé was born Bonnie Ginzburg in 1954 to Roshana Ginzburg and Ralph Ginzburg, publisher of Eros.

She graduated from the New Lincoln School and attended Barnard College, where she received her bachelor's degree. She later received her MSJ from Columbia University School of Journalism, and her J.D. from Georgetown University cum laude.

== Career ==
She began her journalist career in 1975, as a correspondent for United Press International, serving to 1989. She married Mark Robert Erbe in 1979, adopting the name Bonnie Ginzburg Erbé. They were subsequently divorced. In 1989, Erbé left United Press International to become a mutual correspondent for NBC/Mutual Radio and served from 1989 to 1998.

In 1992, Erbé became the moderator for the half-hour weekly news analysis program, To the Contrary, which deals primarily (but not exclusively) with women's issues. The program has won multiple Gracie and Clarion awards, and many others. In 1996, Erbé took the show to the newly formed Persephone Productions. She was a contributing editor at USNews.com, the website of U.S. News & World Report, where she wrote for the Thomas Jefferson Street blog, and also wrote a syndicated newspaper column for 20 years for the Scripps Howard News Service, which won multiple journalism awards.
