= Pat Goss =

American radio and television personality (1941–2022)

Patrick Goss (December 18, 1941 – March 19, 2022) was an American radio and television personality based in Washington D.C. Goss was the master technician on the television program MotorWeek from its start in 1981 until his death, where he hosted a segment called Goss' Garage, and got his start as a mechanic at Rollins Park Shell in Rockville, Maryland.

Goss would also have been seen weekly online on the Goss' Garage Radio Show on YouTube.

Goss owned and managed Goss' Garage (previously Pat Goss Car World), an automobile repair shop in Lanham-Seabrook, Maryland, in suburban Washington D.C. There he continued to help multitudes of car owners gain understanding and confidence about their cars.

From 2006 to 2008, he was heard on Talk Radio 3WT until 3WT went off the air in August 2008. He also hosted a weekend radio show about cars on WJFK-FM in Washington, DC. On his radio show, Goss answered questions regarding "automotive safety, performance and care". In addition to his radio show, he hosted a similarly formatted television talk show on TBD TV in Washington D.C. He had also been featured monthly in a live chat on The Washington Post webpage, where he answered car questions from around the world.

Additionally, he was a spokesperson for Carchex, a Hunt Valley, Maryland, based company offering lead-generation services for automobile dealers and consumer assurance services for consumers. The company primarily offers extended car warranty services.

Goss died on March 19, 2022, at the age of 80. Following the airing of the final six segments of Goss' Garage that had been filmed and a retrospective of his tenure on Motorweek, host John Davis officially retired the Goss' Garage segment. At the time of his death, Goss was one of the last surviving original cast members of Motorweek other than Davis and producer Craig Singhaus, who had originally been chosen for Goss' job, but only appeared in the show's premiere episode in that capacity. In season 42, a new car care segment, Your Drive, hosted by Audra Fordin, Logan McCombs and Dan Maffett replaced Goss' Garage.
