= Ralph Ginzburg =

American editor, publisher, journalist, and photographer (1929–2006)

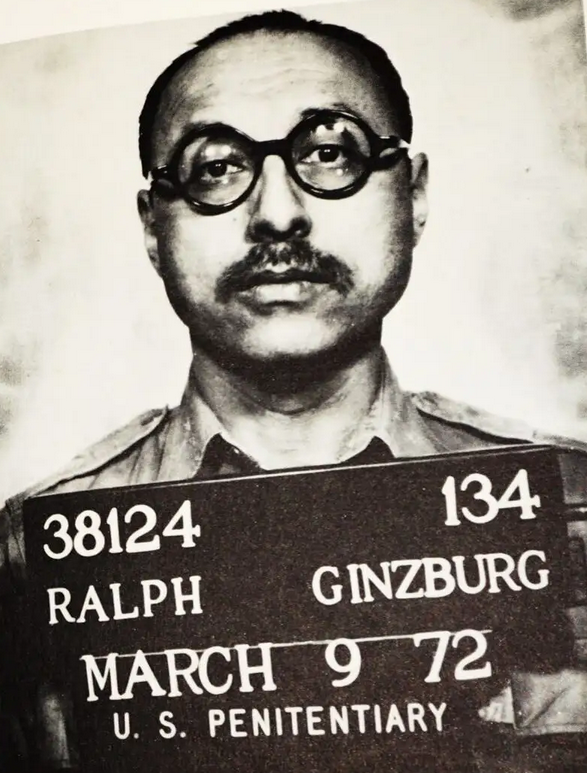
- Born: October 28, 1929; New York City, U.S.
- Died: July 6, 2006 (aged 76); New York City, U.S.
- Occupations: Editor; publisher; journalist; photographer
- Known for: Eros; Avant-Garde

Ralph Ginzburg (October 28, 1929 – July 6, 2006) was an American editor, publisher, journalist, and photographer. He was best known for publishing books and magazines on erotica and art and for his conviction in 1963 for violating federal obscenity laws.

== Biography ==
Ralph Ginzburg was born in Brooklyn on October 28, 1929, to Russian-Jewish immigrant parents. He went to New Utrecht High School in Brooklyn and was president of his class. Since his parents hoped that he could be an accountant, when he first enrolled in City College of New York after high school, he majored in accounting. While Ginzburg was taking a journalism class at CCNY, his professor, Irving Rosenthal, realised his talent in journalism and encouraged him to accept an editorial job on the school newspaper, The Ticker. Ginzburg later became editor-in-chief of it, which further fostered his passion for journalism.

After graduating in 1949, Ginzburg found a job at The New York Daily Compass as a copy boy and cub reporter. He had to leave his job and join the army for the Korean War two years later, and was assigned to Fort Myer, Va, to work for the Public Information Office, where he both edited the post newspaper and took wedding photos for base marriages. Meanwhile, he worked full-time at night as a copy editor for the Times-Herald in nearby Washington, DC. One of his colleagues, an inquiring photographer for the newspaper, was Jackie Lee Bouvier (later Kennedy Onassis).

Following his discharge, Ginzburg worked briefly at NBC, then joined Look magazine as circulation promotion manager. He also worked for Reader's Digest, Collier's, and, as he put it, "other pillars of communications industry respectability". An article he wrote during his spare time, "An Unhurried View of Erotica", impressed Esquire's publisher Arnold Gingrich, and therefore he was offered a job as articles editor at Esquire. During his times there, he expanded the article to a 20,000-word manuscript and published it as a book. This rather scholarly seeming book explored an ostensible undercurrent of pornography that runs throughout English literature. Beginning with a manuscript given by Leofric, Bishop of Exeter, to his cathedral in 1070 through to the outright pornographic work of the 1950s, An Unhurried View examines examples of English erotic literature in an interpretive and explanatory context. The end of the book includes a bibliography of 100 titles. He convinced the notable psychoanalyst Theodor Reik to write the introduction.The book sold more than 125,000 copies in hardback and over 200,000 in print, showing Ginzburg a large potential market for this kind of publication as well as his talents in the mailing business.

In August 1961, Ginzburg managed to conduct an extensive interview of 18-year-old Bobby Fischer. Ginzburg said he got in touch with Fischer by simply giving Fischer's older sister Joan a call, and he "got along well" with Fischer. He sold the interview, entitled "Portrait of a Genius As a Young Chess Master", to Harper's Magazine, which published it in January 1962. The interview of the reclusive chess genius became one of the most famous interviews in history, especially among chess players, and has gained great popularity ever since, partly as the first public indication of Fischer's paranoia and critical behaviours. However, Bobby Fischer himself hated the article and denied most of it, claiming that it was not even a remotely accurate representation of his actual statements or his life, while Ralph Ginzburg destroyed all of the research materials that would have backed his interview. The interview made young Fischer furious and "created a distrust of reporters", and therefore it became practically the last formal interview Fischer ever gave, which ironically added to its popularity.

After he finally saved enough money to rent his own office—a fifth-floor walk-up in an old Manhattan office building, Ginzburg published his first self-published book, 100 Years of Lynchings in 1962, a collection of newspaper accounts that directly exposed the history and the status quo of American racism. The book was a sign that Ginzburg had wed his business to his interest in social activism, and it was regularly adapted by African American studies as one of the primary pedagogical materials to show the harsh nature of pre-civil-rights race relations in America. During this period Ginzburg also published Liaison, a biweekly newsletter, and "The Housewife's Handbook on Selective Promiscuity" by Lillian Maxine Serett, writing as Rey Anthony.

Ginzburg's most famous publication, Eros, a high-priced magazine of classy erotica, was launched in 1962 too, and only four issues were published before he was indicted on charges of violating federal obscenity laws and had to stop publishing the quarterly. He was found guilty by the Supreme Court eventually and sentenced to five years in prison. (He was released after eight months.)

Ginzburg's next publication was Fact, a political journal with a muckraking bent, published between January 1964 and August 1967. The magazine cost him another famous lawsuit after he published a special issue claiming that Senator Barry Goldwater, the Republican presidential candidate that year, was psychologically unfit for the office. He lost the lawsuit again and had to pay $1 in compensatory damages and $75,000 in punitive damages to Senator Goldwater.

From 1968 to 1971, Ginzburg published Avant Garde, an art and culture magazine with graphic and logogram designed by Herb Lubalin, and the logo font of the magazine later gave birth to a well-known typeface of the same name. Avant Garde focused on radical politics and stopped publication when Ginzburg started serving his sentence in 1972. (He wrote "Castrated: My Eight Months in a Federal Prison" to describe his time in prison.) Although he tried to revive it as a tabloid newspaper with his wife after his release from prison, his attempt failed and the new Avant Garde lasted only one issue.

The failure to revive Avant Garde and the lost lawsuit drove Ginzburg to the brink of bankruptcy, but he was saved by the success of his next periodical, the biweekly consumer adviser Moneysworth, which was meant to resemble Consumer Reports and presumably netted 2 to 3 million a year in rentals.

Apart from publishing and editing, Ginzburg continued to be an activist. In 1968, Ginzburg signed the "Writers and Editors War Tax Protest" pledge, vowing to refuse tax payments in protest against the Vietnam War. Ginzburg's interest in activism also extended to opposing circumcision. In 1986, he founded Outlaw Unnecessary Circumcision in Hospitals (O.U.C.H.), a non-profit organisation against circumcision, striving to stop health insurance companies from funding circumcision surgery and therefore lowering the rate of American baby boys being circumcised.

When Ginzburg turned 55, he retired from publishing and started a second career as a photojournalist. He became a freelance photographer for the New York Post, specialising in New York scenes. His last book, I Shot New York, consisted of images he took of life in New York City on 365 consecutive days.

Ralph Ginzburg died of multiple myeloma, on July 6, 2006, in Riverdale, New York City, at the age of 76.

== Eros magazine ==
In 1962, Ginzburg began publication of his first major work, Eros, which was a quarterly hardbound periodical containing articles and photo-essays on love and sex. Herb Lubalin was the art director and second on the masthead. It was named after the Greek god of love and desire, Eros. The publication was bound in cardboard in a 13" x 10" format, averaging about 90 pages in length. Only four issues of Eros were published.

According to Ginzburg, Eros was published as "the result of recent court decisions that have realistically interpreted America's obscenity law that has given this country a new breath of freedom of expression". Pushing and testing the boundaries of censorship after the case of Roth v. United States, Ginzburg made the best of such freedom and devoted the magazine to "the joys of love and sex".

Meanwhile, Eros, in fact, contained more sophisticated and critical subtexts. It offered a wide cover of sexuality in history, politics, art and literature. Ginzburg presented a selection of articles in Eros, including works written by renowned authors like Guy de Maupassant and Allen Ginsberg, while giving out social activism messages such as liberation from excess repression, desacralising democratisation of art, race equality, anti-war and so on.

Eros magazine is significant in American publishing history as it covered and helped to incite the sexual revolution, while it also contributed to the formation of counter-culture in the late 1960s.

=== Ginzburg v. United States ===
==== Trials in lower courts ====
Attorney General Robert Kennedy was offended by the Eros after the second issue was published, which contained a photo-essay of the phenomenon of female reaction to President John F. Kennedy (brother of Robert Kennedy), in the run-up to the 1960 election. He held off his instinct to prosecute, however, afraid that "it would hurt politically by solidifying Kennedy's image as a puritanical Catholic". Meanwhile, while Ginzburg sent out millions of flyers to promote his magazines, both local and federal prosecutors received complaints from recipients of Ginzburg's mailing, and organisations like The National Office for Decent Literature even encouraged their members to send complaints to post offices. At last, the fourth final issue of Eros, with the eight pages of colour photos showing a naked muscular black man and a naked white woman embracing each other, finally convinced Kennedy to authorise prosecution. He was supported by Deputy Attorney General Nicholas Katzenbach and Solicitor General Archibald Cox, and Katzenbach believed that they would eventually prosecute Ginzburg because of his continual testing of boundaries of obscenity in his magazine, "so why wait".

Ginzburg was first put into charge in racially polarised Philadelphia in 1963 and was indicted for Eros, Liaison and the Housewife's Handbook. Those publications were deemed obscene by the court and Ginzburg was found guilty of 28 violations, sentenced to serve five years and fined totalling $42,000. The Trial Judge, Ralph Body, explained the finding of the court as:

In conclusion, after a thorough reading and review of all the indicted materials, this Court finds that said materials are compilations of sordid narrations dealing with sex, in each case in a manner designed to appeal to prurient interests. They are devoid of theme or ideas. Throughout the pages of each can be found constant repetition of patently offensive words used solely to convey debasing portrayals of natural and unnatural sexual experiences. Each in its own way is a blow to sense, not merely sensibility. They are all dirt for dirt's sake and dirt for money's sake.

Ginzburg appealed, and a year later the Third Circuit easily affirmed the decision of the lower court. He appealed again and his case got to the Supreme Court in 1965.

==== Before the Supreme Court ====
The Supreme Court could not easily accept Judge Ralph Body's decision that publications of Ginzburg were obscene since it would contradict the position the Court had already taken in the Roth v. United States, the Jacobellis v. Ohio and numerous other similar cases. Under such consideration and borrowing principles from the Roth case, the Supreme Court carefully assumed that "standing alone, the publications (Eros, Liaison and The Housewife's Handbook on Selective Promiscuity) themselves might not be obscene."

To revise the determination of obscenity, the Court introduced a new concept of variable obscenity that "consideration of the setting in which the publications were presented" should be included as an aid to determining the question of obscenity. "Where the purveyor's sole emphasis is on the sexually provocative aspects of his publications, that fact may be decisive in the determination of obscenity" In short, The Court decided that even non-obscene materials can support an obscenity conviction if the motives of sellers contain obscenity and therefore mailing advertisements for obscene material would be considered illegal, even though the material actually sent in response to orders resulting from the advertisement was not obscene itself.

The focus of Ginzburg's case was thus shifted to the promotion and distribution of those publications. Ginzburg had sought mailing privileges from postmasters at Blue Ball and Intercourse, Pennsylvania, and the trial court found it obvious that "these hamlets were chosen only for the value their names would have in". His advertisement for his publication was also sexually enticing as he knew that it would best attract the attention of the potential customers, while Mr Justice Brennan saw the "leer of the sensualist" in those advertisements, for "reader would look for titillation, not for saving intellectual content". Therefore, the court concluded that Ginzburg's methods of advertising and distributing were attempts to pander to prurient interests with no redeeming social advantages [20], and obscenity was found according to such motive.

The final decision of Ginzburg's fate was reached on March 21, 1966, after a five to four majority affirmed Ginzburg's conviction for violating a federal statute and found him guilty of "commercial exploitation," of "pandering," and of "titillation", crimes he was in fact not charged with. It is noticeable that the court made it clear that though the publications of Ginzburg themselves were protected by First Amendment, Ginzburg's conduct, attitude, motives were not, and he was in fact found guilty because of his sexually-exciting advertising methods, where First Amendment could not apply according to the court.

After the loss of his last plea to vacate his conviction (an appeals court earlier reduce his sentence from five to three), Ginzburg started his time in prison in 1972, and was released on parole eight months later, probably thanks to the effort of his supporters including novelist Sloan Wilson.

==== Contributing factors to Ginzburg's conviction ====
Ralph Ginzburg was quickly put up on charges and convicted partly because he was responsible for not only production (as editor), but also promotion and distribution (as publisher) for Eros, Liaison, and the Housewife's Handbook on Selective Promiscuity. When there was no necessity to sort out the responsibility of different parties, any theory of the case could apply to him, just as the Supreme Court has done by shifting focus from the publications themselves to the way Ginzburg promoted them and found him guilty eventually.

The quickness of Ginzburg's conviction was also under the influence of McCarthyism. Kathryn Ganahan, the Chair of the Post Office Operations Subcommittee and Congresswoman of Philadelphia, where Ginzburg was originally put into trial, demanded prosecution of Ginzburg and claimed obscenity was "part of an international communist plot". Released documents from FBI also showed that he was under investigation for suspicion of being a communist, and there was even a letter to J. Edgar Hoover claiming that Ralph Ginzburg was an influential Communist Party member.

Another contributing factor to Ginzburg's being indicted and found guilty was his appearance. When magazines are typically deemed as an extension of their editors, and editors would be considered as representatives of ideal readers of the magazines, the appearance of Ralph Ginzburg effectively made for a bad impression of his magazine, especially when his magazines were about sex. He looked exactly like Central Casting's idea of a pornographer: "shady, you might say shifty, with a thin, sallow face and a small mustache". Paul Bender, former clerk for Justice Felix Frankfurter, who argued on behalf of the government in the case, described Ginzburg as "a smut peddler". Unlike Hefner of Playboy, he wasn't selling himself as the face of his magazine, yet his appearance implied that the magazines would be of lower interest and not, in fact, more upscale with an artistic taste. On the other hand, his appearance also kept him from gaining more supporters during and after the trial. To borrow from Earl Warren, Chief Justice of the Supreme Court during the period of Ginzburg's case, Ginzburg lost because he was as unattractive a First Amendment claimant as possible.

==== Reception of the conviction of Ginzburg ====
First Amendment advocates including I. F. Stone, Sloan Wilson and Arthur Miller protested Ginzburg's conviction. Commenting on the case and Ginzburg's conviction, Arthur Miller had concluded in the late 1960s:

After all the legal, moral and psychological arguments are done, the fact remains that a man is going to prison for publishing and advertising stuff a few years ago that today would hardly raise an eyebrow in your dentist's office. This is the folly, the menace of all censorship—it lays down rules for all time which are ludicrous a short time later. If it is right that Ralph Ginzburg goes to jail, then in all justice the same court that sentenced him should proceed at once to close down ninety percent of the movies now playing and the newspapers that carry their advertising. Compared to the usual run of entertainment in this country, Ginzburg's publications and his ads are on a par with the National Geographic."

== fact: ==
From January 1964 to August 1967, Ginzburg published a quarterly magazine named fact:, which could be characterized as a humorous, scathingly satiric journal of comment on current society and politics. fact: had surprisingly little erotic content. Rather, it contained articles such as 1189 Psychiatrists Say Barry Goldwater is Unfit for the Presidency. The Goldwater article purported to find the senator paranoid, sexually insecure, suicidal, and "grossly psychotic." Goldwater later sued and won the suit.

== Avant Garde ==
From January, 1968 through July, 1971, Ginzburg published Avant Garde, a handsome softbound periodical. Ginzburg's age and federal conviction had calmed him down some by this time: Avant Garde could not be termed obscene, but was filled with creative imagery often caustically critical of American society and government, as well as sexual themes and (for the time) crude language. One cover featured a naked pregnant woman; another had a parody of Willard's famous patriotic painting, "The Spirit of '76", with a white woman and a black man photographed by Carl Fischer.

Avant Garde had a modest circulation but was extremely popular in certain circles, including New York's advertising and editorial art directors. Herbert F. Lubalin (1918–1981), a post-modern design guru, was Ginzburg's collaborator on his four best-known magazines, including Avant Garde, which in turn gave birth to a well-known typeface of the same name. It was originally intended primarily for use as in logos, with the first version consisting solely of 26 capital letters. Inspired by Ginzburg and his wife, Lubalin's design was rendered by his assistants and Tom Carnase, one of Lubalin's partners. It is characterized by geometrically perfect round strokes and short, straight lines, with an extremely large number of ligatures and negative kerning. The International Typeface Corporation (ITC), of which Lubalin was a founder, subsequently released a full version in 1970.

== Personal life ==
Ginzburg was married to Shoshana Brown Ginzburg until his death on July 6, 2006. He had three children: Shepherd Ginzburg, Lark Kuhta, and Bonnie Erbe, the host of the PBS show To The Contrary.

== List of publications ==
=== Books ===
- An Unhurried View of Erotica, etc. by Ralph Ginzburg; introduction by Theodor Reik; preface by George Jean Nathan (New York: Helmsman Press, 1959. OCLC 560985072)
- 100 Years of Lynchings edited by Ralph Ginzburg (New York: Lancer Books, 1962); Baltimore, MD: Black Classic Press, 1988. ISBN 978-0933121188. OCLC 716335685
- The Housewife's Handbook on Selective Promiscuity by Rey Anthony (real name Maxine Sanini), published by Ralph Ginzburg (New York: Documentary Books, 1962. OCLC 6184512)
- Eros on Trial: "A Portfolio of The Most Beautiful Art From Eros" by Ralph Ginzburg (New York: Book Division of Fact Magazine, 1966. OCLC 1252593950)
- The Best of Fact edited by Ralph Ginzburg and Warren Boroson (New York: Trident Press, 1967, OCLC 869182939)
- Castrated: My Eight Months in Prison (New York: Avant-Garde Books, 1973, ISBN 0-913568-00-7. OCLC 820420559)
- I Shot New York, photographs by Ralph Ginzburg; foreword by George Plimpton; captions by Shoshana Ginzburg (New York: Harry Abrams, 1999, ISBN 0-8109-6367-1. OCLC 1075308081)

=== Magazines ===
- Eros published by Eros Magazine, Inc., New York (Vol. I, Nos. 1–4, 1962)
- Moneysworth published by Avant-Garde Media, Inc.
- Fact published by Fact Magazine, Inc., New York (Vol. I–IV, Jan. 1964 to Aug. 1967). Vol. I, no. 2, included the first printing of Mark Twain's "Some Thoughts on the Science of Onanism".
- Avant Garde published by Avant-Garde Media, Inc.
- Better Living published by Avant-Garde Media, Inc.
- American Business published by Avant-Garde Media, Inc.
- Uncle Sam Magazine published by Avant-Garde Media, Inc.
