= To the Contrary with Bonnie Erbé =

- Presented by: Bonnie Erbé
- Theme music composer: Anne Bryant (1992-2021); Mark Roumelis (2021-present)
- Country of origin: United States
- No. of seasons: 35
- No. of episodes: 800

Production
- Executive producers: Carol Wonsavage (1992-1993); John H. Davis (1993-1998); Cari W. Stein (1998-2024); Luis Mazariegos (2024-present)
- Running time: 30 minutes

Original release
- Network: PBS
- Release: April 3, 1992 – present

To the Contrary with Bonnie Erbé is an American half-hour all-women news-analysis program. The show airs weekly in 91 percent of TV markets on PBS stations in the United States, in Canada, and internationally on Voice of America TV. Award-winning journalist Bonnie Erbé was the show's moderator, and was produced by Persephone Productions since 1996. The show's first executive producer was Carol Wonsavage, who served from the show's debut in 1992 until 1993. John Davis of MotorWeek was the executive producer from 1993 to 1998, followed by Cari W. Stein from 1998 until 2024. Luis Mazariegos has been the executive producer since. When To the Contrary premiered on April 3, 1992, it was taped at Maryland Public Television in Owings Mills, Maryland during the first six seasons, which is also the home to Wall Street Week, and MotorWeek. In 1996, Erbe took the show to the newly formed Persephone Productions. From 1998 to 2009, the show was produced by KPBS in San Diego, California.

The half-hour show debuted on April 3, 1992. Four female panelists and a moderator discuss the week's major developments, with women-related news stories and topics. The first show featured topics, such as The State of the Economy, and SCOTUS and School Desegregation. Erbe's panelists on the first show were Julianne Malveaux, Dorothy Gilliam, Kate O'Beirne, and Linda Chavez. The show tries to focus on how the news affects people, rather than politics.
