= SVSC =

SVSC may refer to:

- Scottish Venezuela Solidarity Campaign, a political group
- Seethamma Vakitlo Sirimalle Chettu, a Telugu-language film
