= NBC logo =

List of logos used by NBC

Current logo, used since 2022

The National Broadcasting Company (NBC) has used several corporate logos over the course of its history. The first logo was used in 1926 when the radio network began operations. Its most famous logo, the peacock, was first used in 1956 to highlight the network's color programming. While it has been in use in one form or another for all but four years since then, the peacock did not become part of NBC's main logo until 1979 and did not universally become the network's sole logo until the fall of 1988 (although the peacock as the sole logo was unveiled in 1986).

Recent logos have been themed for different holidays (such as Christmas, Thanksgiving, Halloween, St. Patrick's Day, Valentine's Day, and New Year's Day), in observance of its upcoming or ongoing broadcasts of the Olympics, as well as an American flag-themed logo following the September 11 attacks. The logo has been adapted for color television and high definition as technology has advanced. As NBC acquired other television channels, the logo branding was formerly adopted by other networks including: CNBC, MSNBC, Golf Channel, and ShopNBC. It is currently used with NBCSN and NBC Sports Regional Networks. The logo was also incorporated into the corporate emblem of the network's parent company, NBCUniversal, then became a part of a redesigned Comcast mark at the end of 2012 after it was acquired by the latter a year before.

== As a radio network (1926–1943) ==
=== 1926–1937 ===
1926 logo

1931 logo

NBC debuted as a radio network in 1926, with a logo depicting a microphone surrounded by lightning bolts, superimposed over a map of the United States. The "NBC" letters appeared in an arc above the graphic.

=== 1931–1943 ===
In 1931, NBC introduced its second logo – a square with a diagonal NBC text in it, with lightning bolts around the "B." This logo was later adopted in 1941 for use as the original logo for the newly formed NBC television network.

== As a television network (1943–1975) ==
In 1943, NBC introduced its third logo, a microphone surrounded by lightning bolts. Lightning bolts denoting electricity were common in the iconography of broadcasting in the early 20th century, and were also depicted in the logo of corporate parent RCA, as well as that of one-time sister company RKO Pictures. The waves placed on the left side were meant for the radio network, and the right waves were meant for the television network. A network identification featuring this logo includes a male announcer saying "This is NBC, the National Broadcasting Company.", followed by the NBC chimes. On the network's flagship television station WNBT (now WNBC), this was accompanied by the same announcer saying "WNBT, New York.". At the beginning of telecasts, a card was shown with a different NBC logo with the letters in cursive and enclosed in a rectangle (a logo also used at the end of broadcasts in the early 1950s). This was replaced by another card depicting an NBC cameraman operating an RCA camera was shown underneath the text "NBC Television Presents". The letters "NBC", lighting in tune with the chimes, indicated time for station identification or the end of a telecast.

1943 NBC television logo

1946 wordmark logo

1952 wordmark logo

1953–1959 color xylophone logo

In 1953, a stylized xylophone and mallet was introduced, symbolizing the NBC chimes, which were first heard on NBC radio in 1927 as a seven-tone sequence. The current tones – which were first adopted in 1929 as a simplified cue for identification of its radio affiliates because of issues with orchestrating the seven notes properly – are only three notes, G, E' and C' (contrary to popular belief, the selection of the three notes was not intended to represent the initials of the network's eventual owner, the General Electric Company, which was an early shareholder in RCA, which itself founded NBC by creating it as a subsidiary, whose full name was "National Broadcasting Company, Inc." prior to the 2004 merger with Universal). The xylophone logo debuted in December 1953, during the Tournament of Roses Parade.

=== Introduction of the Peacock (1956–1959) ===
1956 peacock logo

Network art director John J. Graham and designer Herb Lubalin of Sudler & Hennessey designed a new symbol for the television network in 1956: an abstraction of an eleven-feathered peacock indicating richness in color. This brightly hued peacock, which NBC called "the Bird", was adopted because of the increase in color programming. In addition, NBC's owner, RCA, manufactured color television sets. As a result, the peacock became a marketing tool, in the hopes that people tuning in to NBC would purchase color TV sets. NBC's first color broadcasts showed only a still frame of the colorful peacock. Several modifications were made by NBC before the emblem made its first on-air appearance on May 22, 1956. Despite only being a symbol of the NBC's color programming, with the "chimes" remaining the official logo until 1959, it became an inseparable part of the network's identity.

In the summer of 1957, beginning with Your Hit Parade, the peacock became animated and introduced every NBC color telecast until a revamped animation appeared in 1962. Its musical backing was a gong while the peacock began its formation, with a male announcer saying "The following program is brought to you in living color on NBC.", while the music crescendoed followed by a nine-note flourish while the peacock's feathers changed color and finally spread out. According to Game Show Network executive David Schwartz, the first announcer who spoke those famous words behind the Peacock graphic logo was Ben Grauer, who had been a familiar voice on NBC since 1930. A slide with the letters "NBC" in red, green, and blue respectively and with "TELEVISION" underneath appeared at the end of every color telecast.

=== Snake logo (1959–1976) ===
1959–1975 snake logo

Starting in September 1959, an animated monogram logo joined the Peacock, appearing at the end of every telecast. Starting with the "N", each letter would grow from the other, forming a stacked typographic logo consisting of an "NB" ligature with the "C" forming the base. This would be known as the "NBC snake". Several versions of this exist; the first is the snake forming in front of a multicolored background while an RCA TK-40 or TK-41 camera passed by with a jazz rendition of the NBC chimes, while the second consists of the snake forming against a color-changing background, going from blue to green to red, on each note of the regular, automated NBC chimes. The logo was also designed by John J. Graham.

=== Laramie era (1962) ===
1962–1975 Laramie peacock logo

In 1962 on Laramie, a new version of the Peacock opening logo was introduced in which the bird fanned its bright plumage against a kaleidoscopic color background (with the eleven melded feathers shrinking and separating into the peacock's form). As with the 1956 Peacock, this logo appeared at the start of every NBC color telecast; as all NBC shows eventually began airing in color, it was generally used only to open those shows that were produced by NBC itself, such as The Tonight Show Starring Johnny Carson. It was, however, seen on the NBC airings of The Wizard of Oz as well as on the broadcast of Peter Pan, which had been videotaped at NBC Studios (NBC had previously telecast live versions of Peter Pan in 1955 and 1956 on the anthology Producers' Showcase). The "Laramie Peacock," named for the series which introduced it, used the same "living color" tagline as the first peacock, but the accompanying music was a soft, woodwind-based number, with Mel Brandt providing the voiceover. It was revised further in April 1968, the music having been slightly rearranged and the animation shortened by a few seconds. Another version, with Vic Roby announcing, "Now, a special program in living color on NBC.", was unveiled for use on specials during this same period. It was shortened further on December 31, 1975, when the peacock was retired.

The "Laramie Peacock" made special appearances throughout the ensuing years, mostly in a retro-kitsch context or to commemorate a significant broadcast event on NBC. It was used to promote the network's coverage of the NASCAR Cup Series race held at Darlington Raceway in the Florence, South Carolina region from 2015 to 2020, when it was the series' annual throwback round, where many racecars featured a throwback motif. The Peacock also made an appearance before the premiere of The Tonight Show with Conan O'Brien in 2009. The "Laramie Peacock" has also been used by local stations: the sequence was shown at the beginning of Pittsburgh Dad's Guide to Christmas, a special aired on Pittsburgh NBC affiliate WPXI on December 19, 2014.

On December 6, 2024, in celebration of the 60th anniversary of Rudolph the Red-Nosed Reindeer, as well as its return to NBC after over 50 years of annual airings on CBS, the "Laramie Peacock" logo made a brief return as a nod and tribute to its original broadcast, though shortened to 3 seconds. Additionally, the logo also made appearances during that year's airings of Frosty The Snowman and How the Grinch Stole Christmas!.

== "N" logos (1976–1986) ==
=== Trapezoid "N" (1976–1979) ===
1976–1979 Trapezoid "N" logo

In a bid to modernize the network in time for its fiftieth anniversary, NBC retained New York corporate identity consultancy Lippincott & Margulies in June 1974, to create a modern and standardized identity program across all of its divisions. At its center was an abstract "N", a bold geometric design consisting of two trapezoids – one red and one blue. First teased by way of a press release in October 1975, it was unveiled during a press conference on December 30, 1975, and made its official debut on January 1, 1976, at the start of the Bicentennial year. One of the technological innovations of this logo was its use in the first electronically animated ident for a United States television network. On the January 10, 1976 episode of NBC's Saturday Night (now Saturday Night Live), Weekend Update host Chevy Chase mocked the new logo and its design cost, misquoted as having cost the network $6 million. Johnny Carson also discussed the new logo and its cost on The Tonight Show.

In February 1976, the Nebraska ETV Network (now Nebraska Public Media), the PBS member network for Nebraska, filed a trademark infringement lawsuit against NBC. Nebraska ETV had adopted a virtually identical logo upon their own rebranding the previous June; the only difference being NBC's inclusion of blue whereas NET's symbol was rendered in solid red. The logo, designed in-house by the network's art director Bill Korbus, reportedly only cost around $30; this fact was often contrasted against the "million dollar" - later revealed to be around $62,500 - development cost of NBC's updated identity. In the ensuing litigation, NBC's preliminary identity proposals were revealed to have been completed by the agency in January 1975, whereas NETV's was designed and selected around March; however, the latter were the first to publicly display the symbol. An out-of-court settlement was reached in which NBC gave the network over $800,000 worth of new broadcasting equipment, including a color mobile unit, and an additional $55,000 to cover the cost of designing and implementing a new logo. In return, NBC was allowed to keep the "N" logo.

=== Proud "N" (1979–1986) ===
1979–1986 "Proud N" logo

The Peacock became so closely associated with NBC that in 1979, the network's sitting president, Fred Silverman, moved to reintroduce it as the logo of the network. This decision was influenced by research conducted in 1977 by Peter H. Kliegman from NBC's corporate planning department, which recognized the Peacock's value in identifying NBC-TV, and recommended its use as a logo. The "N" and the Peacock were combined by creative directors Gene Kolomatsky and Ted Szumila in September 1979 to create the "Proud N."

This marked the first time that the Peacock was part of NBC's official logo rather than a signifier of color programming. It was simplified in keeping with the letter's pared-down design. Although all eleven feathers were intact, the teardrop tips were removed, while a simpler color scheme was used for the feathers themselves (blue for the feather behind the peacock's body; yellow, orange, red, violet and indigo respectively for the other feathers on both sides). The Peacock's body became a simple triangular shape, without any feet. On several occasions, the new Peacock was used independently of the "N," starting with the new "Proud as a Peacock" advertising campaign that reintroduced the Peacock; however, the "N" and the Peacock were usually combined between 1979 and 1986.

In 1986, the "N" was retired and the Peacock became the sole logo used by NBC, including the radio network.

== Current Peacock logo (1986–present) ==
1986–2011 peacock logo and wordmark

In 1980, just one year after the "Proud N" was introduced, NBC hired renowned design firm Chermayeff & Geismar to create a new brand identity for the network. Steff Geissbühler designed the simplified peacock that became the network's new logo. The 11 feathers of the previous peacock logo were pared down to six, encompassing each of the primary and secondary colors in the RYB color palette and also representing NBC's six divisions: News (Yellow), Sports (Orange), Entertainment (Red), Stations (Purple), Network (Blue) and Productions (Green). The peacock's head (implied by the negative space cutting into the side of the purple feather) was now flipped to the right – this was done to suggest as if it was looking forward to the future, not back to the past. The shape of the peacock's body was also simplified, becoming vertically elongated, and removing the tips at the bottom and above the head.

This new design remained unused for several years – NBC was ranked last among the Big Three television networks in ratings at the time, and wanted to hold off on the expense of rebranding until it had returned to the number one spot, which it would not do until 1985. Despite the first use of the new logo on August 26, 1985, it was only ultimately unveiled on May 12, 1986, during the finale of the NBC 60th Anniversary Celebration TV special, where past and present NBC stars stood on stage to introduce the new logo. Although NBC had been popularly known as "the peacock network" for some time, it was the first time that "The Bird" had been used as NBC's official symbol all by itself.

After the logo's introduction, many of NBC's affiliates (especially the stations part of NBC's O&O group at the time: WNBC-TV in New York City, KNBC-TV in Los Angeles, WMAQ-TV in Chicago, KCNC-TV in Denver, WRC-TV in Washington, D.C., and WKYC-TV in Cleveland) started adding the new peacock to their station identification. However, a few stations still kept the previous "Proud N" from 1979 at least until the end of the 1987–88 television season, and NBC itself retained the "Proud N" in the title sequence for its movie/mini-series presentations. Because of this, the new logo was not universally adopted until the fall of 1988.

This logo's first appearance as an on-screen bug was in the 1993–94 television season, appearing only during the opening sequences of programs. A separate translucent bug was introduced in the 1996–97 season, appearing only for a few seconds at the beginning of a program's act after the commercial break, and then staying on-screen throughout the duration of programs shortly thereafter. Until the 2004–05 season, the bottom-of-screen logo bug featured a variety of animated effects that built up the image from its components (such as the six feathers rotating into the form of the logo with the peacock's body being formed when the feathers were in place, or a white flag containing the logo wiping the logo bug onto the screen), usually during a show's opening sequence. Until the 2008–09 season, a screensaver-style sequence featuring these logo effects against a black background was also used as a placeholder graphic during slots within commercial breaks allocated for local stations to insert commercials and station promotions. Some NBC affiliates also ran the sequence through the network feed in the event of technical difficulties with inserting local advertising (a placeholder logo graphic remains in use, although from the fall of 2009–10 season to the spring of the 2023–24 season, the animation used has changed to match the network's imaging of the current timeframe).

The network maintains specific guidelines for the logo, including proper colors for reproduction, using either RGB, CMYK, or Pantone colors. The usage guidelines are contained in the NBC Logo Legal Usage Guidelines, which is distributed to NBC employees involved in graphics as well as outside vendors, such as advertising agencies, who may need to use the logo.

=== Adaptations ===
On September 17, 1999, NBC revamped its network identity. A new network ID sequence was introduced, with the NBC logo reflecting through very huge glass feathers; this identity was used until the end of the 2001–02 television season.

==== Flag variation (2001–2002) ====
In the aftermath of the September 11 attacks in 2001, NBC introduced a special version of the peacock that replaced the colors with a furled American flag waving within the logo (including within the logo bug); this version was used until the 2002 Winter Olympics.

==== Adaptation for widescreen/high-definition programming ====
During programs presented in widescreen, the logo bug would be shrunk and placed to fit within the 16:9 video area (specifically, on the right fringe outside of the safe area). During the 2006–07 television season, this smaller widescreen logo was only used during live broadcasts, such as Saturday Night Live, Christmas at Rockefeller Center (the annual special commemorating the Rockefeller Center Christmas tree lighting), Live Earth and the Macy's 4th of July Fireworks Spectacular. The smaller logo was reintegrated at the start of the 2007–08 season on all widescreen programming, including pre-recorded standard definition broadcasts in order to insert graphical promos during the show. The network used a variation of its logo bug accompanied by "HD" text for high-definition programming in the 2006–07 season. Live broadcasts in high-definition previously used the logo without "HD" text. Until 2016, the NBC bug was placed within the 4:3 safe area, with the logo bug being displayed identically on the standard definition and high definition feeds (the color version of the NBC logo bug began to be placed within the 4:3 safe area during high definition programming in May 2008). Today, the NBC bug is placed within the 16:9 widescreen frame, again being displayed identically on the SD and HD feeds.

This logo bug is also presented opaque in full color during the opening credits of a program, with the bug sometimes accompanied by ".com" text as a promotion for the network's website. Live finale episodes of The Biggest Loser continued to use the version with the NBC name titling below the peacock until its September 2009 conversion to HD, due to that program's standard definition production being based out of Burbank instead of New York City.

This logo is sometimes accompanied with NBC text, usually below the peacock; however, this is not always the case. The network's logo bug incorporated the text starting in August 1995, and it becomes colorized on September 18, 2006, NBC Nightly News finally began using the 2006 on screen bug starting on March 26, 2007, to coincide with the program's first high-definition broadcast, with the web address for MSNBC (and since 2012, NBC News) later added to the right side during the program. Programs broadcast in 4:3 SD continued to use the translucent version of the logo until September 13, 2009. Some NBC Sports programs, such as golf and Olympic sports, use a bug incorporating the Olympic rings below the peacock; this version is also used on entertainment and news programming, starting with the beginning of the fall television season in the lead-up to the Winter Olympics, or at the beginning of a calendar year leading up to the Summer Olympics (in 2012, the rings variant was implemented on April 16, 2012, in accordance with "Green is Universal" week, along with sister network Telemundo). The Olympics version of the network's 1986 logo is also used by NBC affiliates for their logos during the network's coverage of the Games (as well as in promotions for the Olympics that precede the start of the Games), both on-air for some stations or confined to the "Olympic Zone" micro-sites. The Olympic rings is also used below the logo of its sister channels, such as Telemundo and USA for example.

==== 2006–2007 ====
Shortly after the beginning of the 2006–07 television season, almost all NBC programming included graphics for Today, Meet the Press, and Dateline NBC. The left version was less embossed than the one used previously and did not display the NBC acronym beneath it. After the beginning of the 2009–10 season on September 28, 2009, as part of the lead-up to the 2010 Winter Olympics in Vancouver, the Olympics variant of the on-screen logo was used on all network programming, except for news.

Since December 2007, NBC occasionally places a text-based advertisement for an upcoming program above or next to the NBC peacock, which is present on both the SD and HD feeds.

==== January–September 2008 ====
NBC updated its logo once again on January 4, 2008, with all network promos and IDs ending with the peacock feathers circling around until forming the 2D logo. The feathers also popped in tune to the NBC chimes, which were sometimes played using different instruments other than the standard xylophone, or other sounds set to G-E-C (such as a telephone in promos for The Office or the ringing of a cash register in promos for Deal or No Deal). The ".com" suffix added to create the URL for promoting the network's website was sometimes featured beside the logo.

==== 2008–2009 ====
Starting for the fall 2008 television season, a 3D glass version of the NBC peacock was introduced, in which a sharp, metal version of the peacock's body zooms out when the feathers blooming out of the body, then forming the logo as they flashed in tune to the NBC chimes like before, with the "Chime In" slogan transforms to the ".com" suffix next to the logo.

==== 2009–2011 ====
2009–2011 peacock logo

On September 14, 2009, with the introduction of the network's "More Colorful" image campaign by design agency Capacity Studios, the network incorporated a flickering effect for a gradient version of the NBC peacock – seen at the end of promos and ID sequences – in which the logo cycles through all six colors before switching to the standard multi-colored logo, usually displayed next to a clip featuring a main character or host of a particular program. Even though the logo was updated throughout the 2010s and 2020s, this logo was still used as its ID sequence until 2024, even it was later used for NBC News from 2013 to 2023.

==== 2011–2013 ====
2011–2013 peacock logo

In May 2011, NBC introduced a glossy 3D version of their logo, which was designed by Zoic Studios and officially came out on September 13, 2011. Other aspects of the 2009 graphics package remained intact, with the absence of the "More Colorful" slogan. Although the 2009 graphics package stays the same, in fall, the graphics package was updated to include computer-generated color bars. A different graphics package was introduced in 2012, featuring the 2011 logo on a bright colored gradient background.

==== 2013–2022 ====
2013–2018 peacock logo and wordmark with Sweet Sans Pro font

2018–2022 modified variant, with NBC Tinker font

In April 2013, NBC altered and modified their 3D logo and changed its wordmark to use Sweet Sans Pro, which officially came out on September 30, 2013.

On September 17, 2018, NBC changed its wordmark to use a new in-house typeface made by Capacity, "NBC Tinker", named after former NBC chairman and CEO Grant Tinker.

In July 2020, NBC temporarily added six vertical pips to the right side of the 2018 logo, which radiate out from each color of the peacock to form the vertical row in order to tie into it being used in the same position for the logo of NBCUniversal's Peacock streaming service, to promote its launch, before reverting to its regular logo in March 2021.

==== 2022–present ====
Variants of the current logo/wordmark, introduced in 2022

In the 2022–23 television season, NBC began to phase in an updated version of the peacock symbol, with its colors made brighter to match the logo of Peacock, the feathers repositioned to make them more "balanced", the peacock's "beak" made larger and more prominent, and more frequent uses of versions of the logo without a white outline. Loyalkaspar and Kerns & Cairns created a variable version of the NBC Tinker font known as "Tinker Pro", with the wordmark using a bolder version of the font. Sibling Rivalry designed the visual identity and branding, which featured the logo cycling through various gradient colors until settling in its usual colors.

The updated peacock was soft-launched in September 2022 as part of the new logo of Sunday Night Football. An associated on-air identity by design agency Sibling Rivalry began to be implemented in December 2022, with a formal launch during its New Year's Eve special. Other NBC divisions (such as NBC News, MSNBC and CNBC) began to adopt the logo in 2023, as well as Comcast itself in 2024 and NBCUniversal in 2026, albeit with a glossy colored gradient.

To promote Wicked: For Good, as well as the special, Wicked: One Wonderful Night, the logo was temporarily changed to pink and green colors to match the colors of the Wicked logo, with the peacock in pink (or half pink and half green if the wordmark is not shown) and the wordmark in green, both with gold borders.

== Other variations ==
A variant with CBS eye. This variant appeared at WTVJ Sales Presentation in 1988.

A variant with flipped beak at the peacock. This variant appeared in a The New York Times advertisement in 2017

Logo for NBC's 100th anniversary, used throughout 2026

Logo of Comcast (parent company of NBC) from 2013 to 2022

In the early 1950s, the bold upper case NBC letters (later used in the 1953 "Xylophone" logo) were also used as an animated "light-up letters" logo in synchronization with the NBC chimes in front of a gray background. This closing sequence was edited in at the end of a network program. Another variant was later used with a darker gray background and a disclaimer underneath the light-up letters: "This program was reproduced by the Kinephoto process," a reference to a live program put onto black and white film identified as a Kinescope recording. This variant was widely used throughout the 1950s and 1960s. Many programs were originally recorded in this manner before the advent of two-inch videotape. NBC, however, continued to use its Kinephoto recording system to archive many of its videotaped programs so the videotapes can be erased and reused for other programming. This is evident with such 1960s programs as Hullabaloo using both archived Kinescope footage with rare color videotape finds, which was later re-released for home video on VHS and DVD.

For NBC's 1965 fall preview special, the peacock introduction began as normal with announcer Mel Brandt's standard introduction; however, when the peacock faded, Brandt is heard saying "It just starts in black and white!" Used to begin the special, the variant – with the voice-over being featured at the beginning of the ident, instead of during the middle – led into almost the complete pre-title teaser of Get Smart's pilot episode, which was shot in black-and-white. This variant is also known as the "Pink Peacock" on video-sharing websites such as YouTube due to the faded color of the video.

In the 1970s, as a rare promotional tape for The Nightmare: Host and Rodney, an undead version of the peacock is shown, with its feathers looking wilted with some falling off, and its neck hunched.

For the first American television broadcast of The Beatles' black-and-white film, A Hard Day's Night, on October 24, 1967, NBC replaced the peacock with a penguin: a caption showing I Dream of Jeannie and The Jerry Lewis Show (the programs NBC was pre-empting that night) was pushed off-screen by an animated, waddling penguin adorned with a top hat and flapping its flightless wings (imitating the peacock), accompanied by announcer Mel Brandt drolly saying "I Dream of Jeannie and The Jerry Lewis Show will not be seen tonight. Instead... (music cue) The following very, very special program is brought to you in lively black and white, on NBC." At the end of the sequence, the penguin is shown taking off its top hat and unzipping its chest, with The Beatles jumping out and performing, before running away while being chased by fangirls.

In 1968, a variant of the 1965 "in living color" peacock ID was featured at the start of an episode of Rowan & Martin's Laugh-In. At the very end of the sequence, the peacock sneezes, sending its feathers flying off-screen, after which the puzzled peacock is shown looking in each direction in notice that its feathers are missing. This clip was later re-used in 1985 to open an episode of TV's Bloopers & Practical Jokes, and in the 2002 special The Most Outrageous Game Show Moments 2. The sneezing peacock was only an animation added onto the end of the original clip of the 1965 peacock ID, as the peacock's feathers became brighter upon switching to the portion in which it sneezed.

In 1993, NBC commissioned several artists such as Al Hirschfeld, Peter Max, John Kricfalusi, J. J. Sedelmaier, David Daniels, Joan C. Gratz, and Mark Malmberg to devise abstract variations of the peacock for promotional use. However, the Gratz bumper was first used in 1992. Animated versions of the Hirschfeld, Sedelmaier, Gratz, and Kricfalusi peacocks acted as stings, and continued to air on the network until 2002.

The NBC late-night talk show Late Night with Conan O'Brien occasionally featured sketches with "Polly, the NBC Peacock", a puppet of the logo who overpraised the network's programming, while mocking the ratings, programming, and stars of its competitors.

In 2017, NBC published a print advertisement in The New York Times marketing itself as the United States' number-one television network, which featured a variant of the peacock with a flipped beak to resemble the number "1".

On January 6, 2026, a special logo commemorating NBC's 100th anniversary designed by Joshua Ecton was unveiled, combining the redesigned peacock and the golden number "100". The logo was accompanied by the tagline "A Century Together", which was unveiled on February 6 of that year.

== See also ==
- American Broadcasting Company logos
- PBS idents
