= Leslie Pockell =

Leslie M. “Les” Pockell (June 19, 1942 – July 26, 2010) was an American publishing executive and anthologist. He was the vice president and associate publisher of Grand Central Publishing and compiled numerous anthologies during his career.

He was born on June 19, 1942, in Norwalk, Connecticut and graduated from Columbia University in 1964. Pockell worked at St. Martin's Press, Doubleday and the Book-of-the-Month Club before joining Warner Books, which became Grand Central Publishing. During his career, he edited works for a diverse group of authors from novelists Donald Westlake and Anna Porter to the physicist Leonard Mlodinow to the former Whitewater controversy prosecutor Ken Starr to the critic Harold Bloom to the actor and children's writer John Lithgow. He was also a colleague of Jacqueline Kennedy Onassis at Doubleday.

He was also an editor of the Avant-Garde magazine.

He died on July 26, 2010, at 68 years old.
