= Tom Carnase =

American graphic and type designer

Thomas "Tom" Paul Carnase (born 1939 in the Bronx) is an American typographer, type designer, and graphic designer, known for his Spencerian script. He currently operates a studio in Palm Springs, California.

== Career ==
After graduating with an associate bachelor of fine arts degree from New York City Community College in 1959, Carnase spent the first five years of his career in the design division of Sudler & Hennessey under the direction of Herbert Lubalin before creating freelance design studio Bonder & Carnase Inc. with Ronne Bonder in 1964.

Carnse left Bonder & Carnase Inc. in 1967, becoming vice president of Lubalin, Smith, Carnase (also known as Herb Lubalin, Inc. or Lubalin Inc.). Much of the lettering attributed to Lubalin during this period was created by Carnase under Lubalin's direction contrary to popular belief. Carnase has stated that he felt under compensated and recognized for his work at this time, particularly in regards to his contributions to ITC Avant Garde.

Carnase co-founded the World Typeface Corporation, also known as the World Typeface Center and abbreviated to WTC in 1980. From 1982 to 1987, WTC released the quarterly typography journal Ligature, published and creatively directed by Carnase. Volume 1, Number 1 of the journal was released in June, 1982 and describes itself as "all about type and typography. It's about letterforms, their use and abuse, their history and their future." The journal presented articles about typographic technology and specimens of WTC fonts.

Throughout his career, Carnase held various different teaching positions. Institutions he worked at include the Pratt Institute, Parsons School of Design, and Rochester Institute of Technology (RIT).

== Notable works ==
Throughout his career, Carnase has contributed to numerous notable projects including over 100 typefaces. Some of his clients included ABC, CBS, NBC, and Coca-Cola. Tom donated much of his work to the Cary Graphic Arts Collection at Rochester Institute of Technology.

=== ITC Avant Garde Gothic ===
ITC Avant Garde Gothic is a typeface based on Herb Lubalin's logotype for the Avant Garde magazine. Lubalin sketched the original glyph set and Carnase later added additional ligatures and letterforms as well as alternate weights and styles.

=== Gastrotypographicalassemblage ===
The Gastrotypographicalassemblage consists of nine panels of wood typography. It was designed by Lou Dorfsman for the CBS Building in 1966. Carnase helped to design the hand-milled typography. The artwork contained nearly 1500 individual letterforms.

=== WTC Our Bodoni ===
Commissioned by Bert Di Pamphilis, WTC Our Bodoni is a Bodoni revival designed by Tom Carnase under the direction of Massimo Vignelli for WTC. The typeface consisted of four different weights with headings. The difference in x-height in Carnase's revival compared to the source material and other revivals led to it being named Our Bodoni.

=== Mother and Child logo ===
Designed in 1965 by Alan Peckolick, Carnase finalized the Mother & Child logo. When the magazine it was designed for never published, art director Herb Lubalin repurposed the logo turning it into the Mother & Son logo for a memoir by Jeremy Seabrook instead.
