= Avant-Garde (magazine) =

Magazine

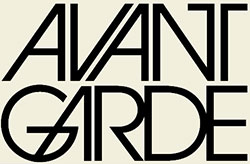
Avant Garde logogram featuring typeface of the same name. Designed by Herb Lubalin.

Avant Garde was a magazine notable for graphic and logogram design by Herb Lubalin. The magazine had 14 issues and was published from January 1968 to July 1971. The magazine was based in New York City.

The editor was Ralph Ginzburg and this was the third collaboration with Lubalin. Previously they worked on Eros and Fact.

Avant Garde 3, published in May 1968, lists in the masthead:

Peter Schjeldahl as Features Editor, Leslie M. Pockell as Articles Editor, Lawrence Witchel, Executive Editor, L. Ransom Burton, Copy Editor, Rosemary Latimore, Research Director, Art Whitman, Production Director, Miriam Fier, Business Director, Paul Finegold handled circulation, Advertising was managed by Richard Stoneman, and Shoshanna Ginzburg was Promotion Director.

From January 1968 through July 1971, Ginzburg published Avant Garde. While it could not be termed obscene, it was filled with creative imagery often caustically critical of American society and government, sexual themes, and (for the time) crude language. One cover featured a naked pregnant woman; another had a parody of Willard's famous patriotic painting, "The Spirit of '76", substituting the figure of a youth with a white woman, and the central figure of an older white drummer with a black man.

Avant Garde had a modest circulation but was extremely popular in certain circles, including New York's advertising and editorial art directors. Herbert F. Lubalin (1918–1981), a post-modern design guru, was Ginzburg's collaborator on his four best-known magazines, including Avant Garde, which gave birth to a well-known typeface of the same name. It was originally intended primarily for use in logos: the first version consisted solely of 26 capital letters. It was inspired by Ginzburg and his wife, designed by Lubalin, and realized by Lubalin's assistants and Tom Carnase, one of Lubalin's partners. It is characterized by geometrically perfect round strokes; short, straight lines; and an extremely large number of kerned ligatures. The International Typeface Corporation (ITC) (of which Lubalin was a founder) released a full version in 1970.
