= Lillian Maxine Serett =

Author and lecturer (1924–1994)

Lillian Maxine Serett (1924–1994), also known as Maxine Sanini and Maxine Savant, born Lillian Maxine Harrison in Groveton, Texas, January 28, 1924, was an author and lecturer on sex and sex techniques. She is best known as the author of The Housewife's Handbook on Selective Promiscuity. When she was 36 and wrote the book, her legal name was Lillian Maxine Savant, but she wrote under the pseudonym of "Rey Anthony". Advertisements for the book were deemed obscene leading to the court case Ginzburg v. United States, in which the book's publisher, Ralph Ginzburg was prosecuted and served six months in federal prison for publishing the book. Savant, the author, was never prosecuted. "Maxine Serett" was an assumed name she took on only for the trial. At the time of her death from a heart attack at age 70 in Pasadena, Texas, she had been using the assumed name Maxine Sanini for more than two decades. An ebook of Housewife's Handbook on Selective Promiscuity, subtitled Definitive Edition, edited by Toni Savant, one of Serett's five daughters, and containing a biography of the author, was published and posted on Amazon.com on May 26, 2012.
