= Ginzburg v. United States =

- Supreme Court of the United States

Argued December 7, 1965 Decided March 21, 1966
- Full case name: Ralph Ginzburg et al, Petitioner, versus United States.
- Citations: 383 U.S. 463 (more) 86 S. Ct. 942; 16 L. Ed. 2d 31

Case history
- Prior: United States v. Ginzburg, 224 F. Supp. 129 (E.D. Pa. 1963); affirmed, 338 F.2d 12 (3d Cir. 1964).
- Subsequent: Rehearing denied, 384 U.S. 934 (1966); sentence upheld on remand, United States v. Ginzburg, 436 F.2d 1386 (3d Cir. 1971); cert. denied, 403 U.S. 931 (1971); rehearing denied, 404 U.S. 875 (1971).

Holding
- Evidence such as advertisements that publications were deliberately presented and commercially exploited as erotic is allowable as part of considering if that material is obscene.

Court membership
- Chief Justice Earl Warren Associate Justices Hugo Black · William O. Douglas; Tom C. Clark · John M. Harlan II; William J. Brennan Jr. · Potter Stewart; Byron White · Abe Fortas

Case opinions
- Majority: Brennan, joined by Warren, Clark, White, Fortas
- Dissent: Black
- Dissent: Douglas
- Dissent: Harlan
- Dissent: Stewart

Laws applied
- First Amendment, Comstock laws
- Superseded by
- Miller v. California, 413 U.S. 15 (1973)

Ginzburg v. United States, 383 U.S. 463 (1966), was a decision by the United States Supreme Court involving the application of the First Amendment to federal obscenity laws. One of a trio of cases (with Memoirs v. Massachusetts and Mishkin v. New York released on the same day), Ginzburg was part of the Supreme Court's attempt to refine the definitions of obscenity after the landmark 1957 case Roth v. United States.

== Obscenity law ==
The First Amendment puts protection for expressive content in terms that are both sweeping and absolute: "Congress shall make no law... abridging the freedom of speech, or of the press" Despite this broad protection, the roots of U.S. attempts to legally suppress obscenity extend back to the English common law offense of obscene libel and censorship of stage plays by the Master of the Revels.

American definitions of obscene material were variable and sporadic until 1879, when the test adopted in the English case Regina v. Hicklin (1868) was used in the prosecution of D. M. Bennett. This test regarded all material tending "to deprave and corrupt those whose minds are open to such immoral influences" as obscene, regardless of its artistic or literary merit. This same test was adopted by the United States Supreme Court in Rosen v. United States, 161 U.S. 29 (1896). Under this test, works such as Honoré de Balzac's Contes Drolatiques, Gustave Flaubert's Madame Bovary, James Joyce's Ulysses, and D. H. Lawrence's Lady Chatterley's Lover had all been subject to suppression under the federal Comstock Laws.

In the 1957 case Roth v. United States, 354 U.S. 476, the Supreme Court created a new, stricter definition of obscene material as media where "...to the average person, applying contemporary community standards, the dominant theme of the material, taken as a whole, appeals to prurient interest." This definition repudiated the former practice of finding the most shocking passages and presenting them out of context. The new definition led to much confusion, however, over what terms such as "contemporary community standards" meant in practice.

Although Roth had altered the legal landscape, it did not invalidate Federal laws against mailing of obscene materials. Title 18, section 1461 of the U.S. Code declared "Every obscene, lewd, lascivious, indecent, filthy or vile article..." and "Every ...letter, circular, book, pamphlet, advertisement...giving information...where, or how, or from whom...any of such...articles, or things may be obtained..." unmailable in the United States. The penalty for mailing materials covered by this prohibition was a fine of up to $5,000, (Note: equivalent to $53,218 in 2025) up to five years' imprisonment, or both, for a first offense.

== Prior history ==
Ralph Ginzburg owned or controlled three companies: Documentary Books, Inc., Eros Magazine, Inc. and Liaison News Letter, Inc. Documentary Books was the publisher of "Rey Anthony's" The Housewife's Handbook on Selective Promiscuity, while Eros was described by its publisher as "frankly and avowedly concerned with erotica..." and the Liaison News Letter professed a dedication to "keeping sex an art and preventing it from becoming a science." Ginzburg's companies mailed advertisements nationwide (Note: "...five million advertisements for the Eros material were mailed out to prospects in this country...") for these three publications in 1962. At least one of these advertisements said that the publications were protected by "recent court decisions", presumably referring to Roth.

Ginzburg and his companies were charged with 28 counts of violating 18 U.S.C. 1461 and found guilty on June 14, 1963. Ginzburg was sentenced to five years in prison and fines of $42,000 (Note: equivalent to $447,030 in 2025) were levied against him and his companies. The trial judge in the Eastern District of Pennsylvania, Ralph C. Body, summarized his findings on the three publications' possible merits as: "They are all dirt for dirt's sake and dirt for money's sake." On appeal to the Third Circuit Court of Appeals, Ginzburg challenged the convictions on the basis that the publications were not "obscene" within the meaning of the Roth decision, claiming they had "...redeeming social importance with respect to literary and artistic values." The Appeals Court ruled by a 3-0 decision that all three publications were without social, literary, or artistic value, violated contemporary community standards, and appealed solely to prurient interests, making them obscene within the meaning of the statute. They affirmed the convictions and Ginzburg appealed to the Supreme Court.

== Decision ==
The Court endorsed the determinations of the lower courts that Ginzburg's publications were obscene but extended the grounds for determining the merit (or lack thereof) of challenged publications. Brennan noted that "...each of the accused publications was originated or sold as stock in trade of the sordid business of pandering". The analysis of the publications focused almost entirely on Ginzburg's marketing, saying "The 'leer of the sensualist' also permeates the advertising for the three publications." Among other points, the decision noted that Ginzburg had first sought to mail these publications from Blue Ball and Intercourse in Pennsylvania before being allowed bulk mailing privileges from Middlesex, New Jersey and "...that these hamlets were chosen only for the value their names would have in furthering petitioners' efforts to sell their publications on the basis of salacious appeal."

Although the publications were defended on the basis that portions of them had possible merit, the Court rejected this defense. The non-obscene portions were held to be a smokescreen which was belied by the publisher's presentation of them as appealing only to the titillation of the reader. "We perceive no threat to First Amendment guarantees in thus holding that in close cases evidence of pandering may be probative with respect to the nature of the material in question and thus satisfy the Roth test."

== Effects of the decision ==
Ginzburg's original conviction was upheld and he served eight months in prison.

Roth v. United States had declared that obscene speech was not speech protected by the First Amendment, while also holding that speech with "even the slightest redeeming social importance" was not obscene. Between 1957 and 1965 the Supreme Court had heard fourteen cases that partially or wholly dealt with obscenity and attempts to apply the Roth standard in both state and Federal court cases. In none of these cases did the Court affirm an obscenity conviction but the confusing and sometimes contradictory opinions that accompanied these judgments made it clear how difficult it was to apply the tests announced in the abstract in Roth to actual cases.

Ginzburg was the first post-1957 case where the Court affirmed a conviction but it did so by greatly reinterpreting the Roth test. The Roth test and even the previous Hicklin test both examined the contents of the challenged publication in a vacuum. By extending the analysis of Ginzburg's publications to his marketing of them, the Court had created a new type of variable obscenity that depended on external indicators of obscenity. Justice Harlan's dissent criticized this expansion as the materials would not be obscene without these external factors: "...the Court in the last analysis sustains the convictions on the express assumption that the items held to be obscene are not, viewing them strictly, obscene at all."

Obscenity determinations by the lower courts were made more difficult by this decision. Adding to the difficulty, the three obscenity cases announced on that date produced a total of fourteen separate opinions. Justice Black in his dissent protested that: "...not even the most learned judge, much less a layman, is capable of knowing in advance of an ultimate decision in his particular case by this Court whether certain material comes within the area of 'obscenity' as that term is confused by the Court today." One legal scholar likened the result of these three decisions to the Tower of Babel. This state of confusion would persist until the Miller v. California case in 1973.

== See also ==
- List of United States Supreme Court cases, volume 383
- List of United States Supreme Court cases
