= Herb Lubalin =

American graphic designer (1918–1981)

- Herb Lubalin's studio logo.
- Born: Herbert F. (Herb) Lubalin; March 17, 1918
- Died: May 24, 1981 (aged 63)
- Occupations: Type Designer, Graphic Designer
- Spouse: Sylvia Kushner

Herbert F. Lubalin (/luˈbælɪn/; March 17, 1918 – May 24, 1981) was an American graphic designer. He collaborated with Ralph Ginzburg on three of Ginzburg's magazines: Eros, Fact, and Avant Garde.

== Biography ==
Herb Lubalin was born March 17, 1918, in New York. There he lived with his parents, older sister, and twin brother. His parents were very appreciative of the arts and were supportive of his artistic capabilities and talent. Early into his education, his parents realized that he was color blind.

== Education and early career ==
Lubalin entered Cooper Union at the age of seventeen, and quickly became interested in typography as a communicative implement. Gertrude Snyder notes that during this period Lubalin was particularly struck by the differences in interpretation one could impose by changing from one typeface to another, always “fascinated by the look and sound of words (as he) expanded their message with typographic impact.”

After graduating in 1939, Lubalin had a difficult time finding work; he was fired from his job at a display firm after requesting a raise from $8/week (around US$100 in 2006 currency) to $10.

Lubalin would briefly land at Reiss Advertising, and then (in 1945) at Sudler & Hennessey, where he worked for 19 years. Lubalin and John J. Graham created the original NBC Peacock in 1957 at Sudler. The Cooper Union web book, 100 Days of Herb Lubalin (day 46), displays a Sudler ad from the 1950s that shows Andy Warhol, Art Kane and John Pistilli were among his employees.

Pistilli Roman (1964) was Lubalin's first typeface. Google Images show it later comprised the trademarks of Lincoln Center, the Metropolitan Opera and the New York Philharmonic from 1978 to 1985.

In 1961 Lubalin designed the trademark for the Saturday Evening Post, which it used for several years. His work redesigning the magazine was portrayed in a cover painting by Norman Rockwell.

Lubalin left Sudler to start his own firm, Herb Lubalin, Inc., in 1964.

== Private practice ==
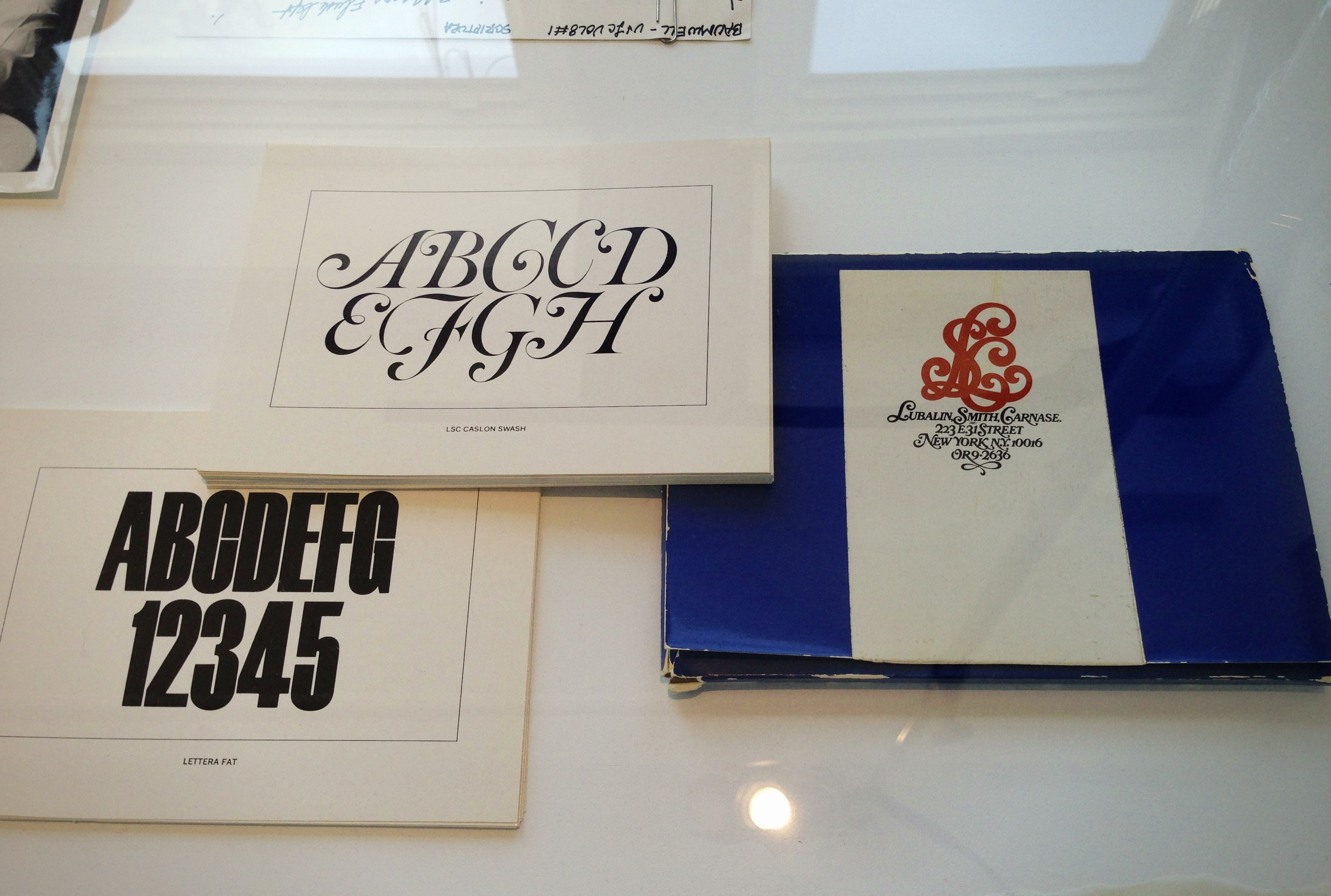
Memorabilia of Lubalin Smith Carnase

Lubalin created the trademark for the World Trade Center at its opening (1973). He designed versions of Reader's Digest, New Leader and the entire series of Eros magazine, the last of which was the subject of a U.S. Supreme Court case on obscenity, Ginzburg v. United States 383 U.S. 463 (1966).

=== Eros Magazine and Fact Magazine ===
In Lubalin's private studio, he worked on a number of wide-ranging projects, from poster and magazine design to packaging and identity solutions. It was here that he became best known for his work on a series of magazines published by Ralph Ginzburg: Eros, Fact, and Avant Garde.

Eros (four issues, Spring 1962 to 1963) devoted itself to the beauty of the rising sense of sexuality and experimentation, particularly in the burgeoning counterculture. It was a quality production with no advertising, and the large format (13 by 10 inches) made it look like a book rather than a quarterly magazine. It was printed on varying papers and the editorial design has been considered as among Lubalin's greatest achievements. It quickly folded after an obscenity case brought by the U.S. Post Office.

Ginzburg and Lubalin followed with Fact, largely founded in response to the treatment Eros received. This magazine's inherent anti-establishment sentiment lent itself to outsider writers who could not be published in mainstream media; Fact managing editor Warren Boroson noted that “most American magazine, emulating the Reader's Digest, wallow in sugar and everything nice; Fact has had the spice all to itself.” Rather than follow with a shocking design template for the publication, Lubalin chose an elegant minimalist palette consisting of dynamic serifed typography balanced by high-quality illustrations. The magazine was printed on a budget, so Lubalin stuck with black and white printing on uncoated paper, as well as limiting himself to one or two typefaces and paying a single artist to handle all illustrations at bulk rate rather than dealing with multiple creators. The result was one of dynamic minimalism that emphasized the underlying sentiment of the magazine better than “the scruffy homemade look of the underground press [or the] screaming typography of sensationalist tabloids” ever could.

Fact itself folded in controversy as Eros before it, after being sued for several years by Barry Goldwater, the Republican presidential candidate, about whom Fact wrote an article entitled “The Unconscious of a Conservative: A special Issue on the Mind of Barry Goldwater.” Goldwater was awarded a total of $90,000, effectively putting Fact out of business.

=== Avant Garde (magazine) ===
==== Logo ====
The creation of the magazine's logogram proved difficult, largely due to the inherent difficulties presented by the incompatible letterform combinations in the title. Lubalin's solution consisted of tight-fitting letterform combinations to create a futuristic, instantly recognizable identity. The demand for a complete typesetting of the logo was extreme in the design community, so Lubalin released ITC Avant Garde from his International Typeface Corporation in 1970. Steven Heller, one of Lubalin's fellow AIGA medalists, notes that the “excessive number of ligatures . . . were misused by designers who had no understanding of how to employ these typographic forms,” further commenting that “Avant Garde was Lubalin’s signature, and in his hands it had character; in others’ it was a flawed Futura-esque face.”

==== Page design ====
Avant Garde (14 issues, January 1968 to summer 1971) also provided Lubalin with a large format of wide typographic experimentation; the page format was an almost square 11.25 by 10.75 inches bound in a cardboard cover, a physical quality that, coupled with Lubalin’s layouts, caught the attention of many in the New York design scene. Ginzburg, who held some experience as a photographer, gave Lubalin total control over the magazine’s look: “Herb brought a graphic impact. I never tried to overrule him, and almost never disagreed with him.” Other issues included a portfolio of Picasso's oft-neglected erotic engravings, which Lubalin willingly combined with his own aesthetic, printing them in a variety of colors, in reverse, or on disconcerting backgrounds. Unfortunately, Avant Garde again caught the eye of censors after an issue featuring an alphabet spelled out by nude models; Ralph Ginzburg was sent to prison, and publication ceased with a still-growing circulation of 250,000.

==== ITC Avant Garde ====
In 1970, ITC Avant Garde Gothic was released as part of ITC's first typeface release with ITC Souvenir. The font was created by Lubalin and Tom Carnase based on their wordmark for the Avant Garde magazine. Condensed styles were drawn by Ed Benguiat in 1974.

=== U&lc Magazine ===
Lubalin spent the last ten years of his life working on a variety of projects, playing a key role in the International Typeface Corporation and its typographic journal U&lc (short for Upper and lower case). Steven Heller argues that U&lc was the first Emigre, or at least the template for its later successes, for this very combination of promotion and revolutionary change in type design. Heller further notes, “In U&lc, he tested just how far smashed and expressive lettering might be taken. Under Lubalin’s tutelage, eclectic typography was firmly entrenched.” Lubalin enjoyed the freedom his magazine provided him; he was quoted as saying “Right now, I have what every designer wants and few have the good fortune to achieve. I’m my own client. Nobody tells me what to do.”
