= Proud as a Peacock =

Advertising campaign developed by NBC

1979 "Proud as a Peacock" logo. The thin-plumed, candy corn-coloured peacock was different than the one found on the "Proud N". The old "Abstract N" still appears at the bottom.

"Proud as a Peacock" was the advertising campaign used by the NBC television and radio networks from 1979 to 1981. The campaign was used to promote NBC's programming and to introduce the "Proud N", a logo that would be used until 1986.

== The campaign ==
By 1979, NBC was deeply mired in third place in the Nielsen ratings. Fred Silverman, who joined the network a year earlier, could not bring the same ratings success he had as programming whiz at ABC and CBS, resulting in a string of programs (such as Supertrain) that were derided by critics and/or tuned out by viewers.

In an attempt to present a positive image in the face of this failure, Silverman and NBC developed an ad campaign called "Proud as a Peacock". The campaign featured a revised version of the famous NBC Peacock logo, billed as the "Proud N", along with a catchy high-energy jingle (written for NBC by Joey Levine (then known for singing "Life Is a Rock (But the Radio Rolled Me)" in 1974 and in the 1960s, sang lead vocals on bubblegum pop sound music from Crushing Enterprises) that promotes a network ready to shed its losing reputation and project an image of excitement in its programming. Future R&B singing legend Luther Vandross was among the artists who performed on the jingle.

The 1979–1980 season's "Proud" campaign promos were produced in New York City for NBC's radio and television networks, and customized versions were produced for the network's affiliates. The campaign was introduced on May 14, 1979, to promote the network's Fall lineup, and was used again in the 1980–1981 season with a revised jingle - "We're Proud!"

Despite the network's effort at "puttin' on a whole new face", NBC's difficulties continued unabated. Successes such as Little House on the Prairie and Diff'rent Strokes and the miniseries Shogun were countered by a flood of failed new programming (such as Pink Lady), which led to near-daily schedule changes. NBC continued to lag in last place behind CBS and ABC, producing only three Nielsen Top 20 shows in both the 1979-1980 and 1980–1981 seasons.

NBC was also forced to cancel plans to cover the 1980 Summer Olympics in the wake of the United States' boycott of the Moscow Games, resulting in many millions of dollars lost in rights fees, facility/equipment investments, and potential ad revenue.

The continued failures led to ridicule of the "Proud" campaign from both within the network and without (see below). Silverman would leave NBC in the summer of 1981; that fall the network adopted a slightly new campaign ("Our Pride Is Showing") with little difference in ratings.

By the mid-1980s, NBC's fortunes finally began to turn around, due to changes made by Silverman's replacement, Brandon Tartikoff, and his boss, former producer Grant Tinker; they were responsible for such now-legendary programs as The Cosby Show, Family Ties, Miami Vice, The Golden Girls, and Cheers, among many others.

== The "Loud" parody ==
The moves (and failures) of NBC under Fred Silverman's management generated a feeling of frustration and embarrassment among many of the network's employees; they were not as proud of the network as the "Proud" campaign suggested, and a few inside staffers composed an alternative jingle to express their disappointment.

"We're Loud – Proud as a Peacock" was a radio-style parody of NBC's 1980–1981 "We're Proud" campaign, recorded by the same production studio the network employed for "Proud" and using the same voice cast used for the original "Proud" campaign. "Loud" voiced the disappointment that many of NBC's employees felt under Silverman's leadership. The jingle was widely circulated to network staff and even sent out to local affiliates on cassettes as a joke at Christmastime.

The joke ended when Don Imus, then the morning host at WNBC radio in New York City, played the parody on-air. Angered by Imus' move, Silverman ordered a search-and-destroy mission to purge the network of any remaining copies of the parody. However, many copies remained, albeit with poor audio quality and therefore were not fit for broadcast. However, just as how "Proud as a Peacock" was parodied, so was "Our Pride Is Showing". It was spoofed at the beginning of an October 3, 1981 episode of Saturday Night Live as "Our Age Is Showing" and the spoof featured an aged and disoriented NBC logo. "Proud as a Peacock" was also parodied at the beginning of an October 13, 1979 episode of Saturday Night Live as "Smart as a Peacock", which was meant as a way for SNL staff to ridicule NBC for causing the sketch variety series' disputes and problems during that time.

== Meaning of the phrase ==
"Proud as a peacock" is a saying that is used to mean a vain or self-centered person. The phrase comes from the plumage of the male peafowl (females are peahens). When a male is courting, he spreads his tail feathers, sometimes five feet in length, out in a fan pattern to attract a female. Thus, someone who is "proud as a peacock" is similarly "strutting his stuff".

== See also ==
- NBC logo
