= John J. Graham =

American graphic artist and designer

John J. Graham (September 25, 1923 – June 12, 1994) was an American graphic artist who designed and created both the NBC peacock logo (1956) and the NBC "snake" logo (1959).

== Biography ==
NBC snake logo, used from 1959 to 1975

Graham was born in New York City, where he attended the School of Industrial Art (now the High School of Art and Design) and later, studied under Artist Jack Levine. He joined NBC after World War II, where he was responsible for designing the television division's various logos, title cards, print materials, advertising, and promotions. In 1956, he worked his team of 15, including Herb Lubalin, to create the peacock logo. The logo was prompted by his wife, Candella, and Graham felt that the color and animation of the logo would encourage audiences to watch the commercials. In the early 1950s, Graham, as NBC Art Director, hired a young Andy Warhol to do some of his first commercial works, including title art and ads. In 1966, NBC President Julian Goodman appointed Graham Director of Design for the entire network.

Graham also created book designs, including the title Somehow it Works about the 1964 Presidential election, which was honored as one of AIGA's "50 Best Books of 1965."

Graham retired from NBC in 1977 and continued his association with NBC as a consultant. The rest of Graham's time was spent painting, illustrating and designing layouts for books. He died in 1994, aged 70. He was survived by his three children; Bruce Graham, Maggie Zackheim and Ben Zackheim.
