= Some Thoughts on the Science of Onanism =

1879 speech by Mark Twain

"Some Thoughts on the Science of Onanism" is a speech delivered by Mark Twain in Paris at the Stomach Club in spring, 1879. The Stomach Club was a collection of U.S. expatriate writers and artists, such as Edwin Austin Abbey. The speech satirically dealt with masturbation ("onanism") and the perceived bane it is on society. Long suppressed, it was first circulated by the Twain specialist, Franklin J. Meine, in typewritten copies during the 1940s, and by Chicago advertising man, George Brownell, in twenty-five mimeographed copies circulated among members of the Mark Twain Society of Chicago in 1952. It was first actually printed in Ralph Ginzburg's Fact magazine. The first printed copies appeared in 1952 as an accordion-folded version limited to 100 copies.

In 1976, the speech was published as "Some Remarks on the Science of Onanism" in The Mammoth Cod and Address to the Stomach Club.
