= Eros (magazine) =

Political magazine in the USA (1962)

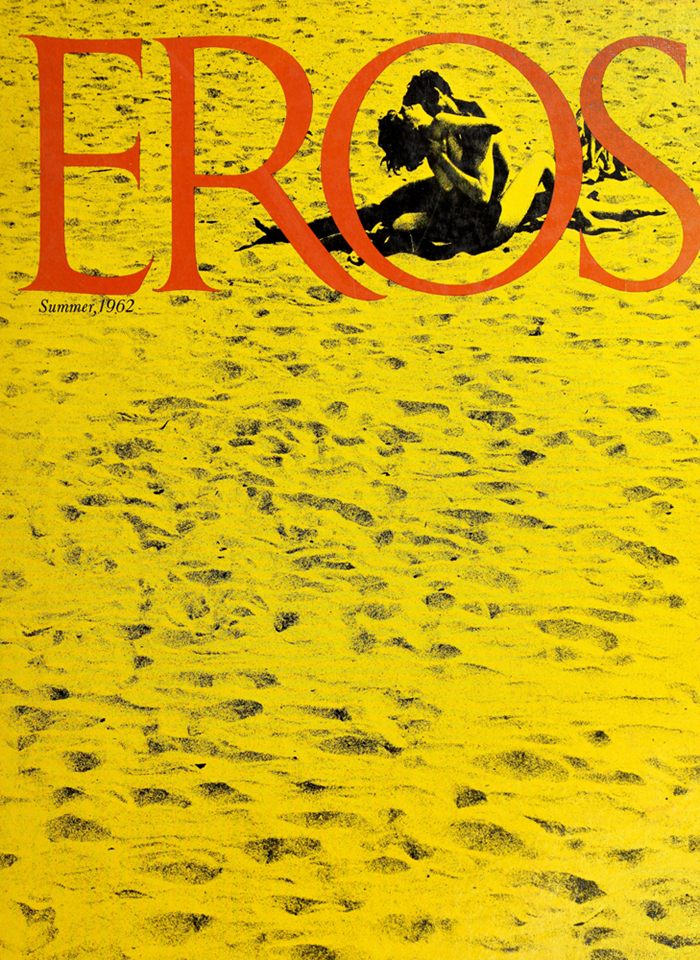
- Cover of issue 2, Summer 1962
- Editor: Ralph Ginzburg
- Categories: Political magazine; Literary magazine
- Frequency: Quarterly
- Founder: Ralph Ginzburg; Herb Lubalin
- Founded: 1962
- First issue: Spring 1962
- Final issue: Winter 1962
- Country: USA
- Based in: New York City
- Language: English

Eros was an American quarterly political and literary magazine that published only four volumes in 1962. The New York Times described Eros as a “stunningly designed hardcover ‘magbook’,” covering “a wide swath of sexuality in history, politics, art and literature.” The magazine was the first product of Ralph Ginzburg and Herb Lubalin who later created two other influential magazines, namely Fact and Avant Garde.

== History and profile ==
The first issue of the magazine appeared in Spring 1962. Ralph Ginzburg was the editor and Herb Lubalin was the art director of Eros which came out quarterly. It was named after the Greek god of love and desire, Eros. According to Ginzburg, Eros was published as "the result of recent court decisions that have realistically interpreted America's obscenity law that has given this country a new breath of freedom of expression". Pushing and testing the boundaries of censorship after the case of Roth v. United States, Ginzburg made the best of such freedom and devoted the magazine to "the joys of love and sex".

The focus of the magazine was on love and sex during the dawning of the Sexual Revolution. It also covered articles on politics, arts and literature. Meanwhile, Eros, in fact, contained more sophisticated and critical subtexts. It offered a wide cover of sexuality in history, politics, art and literature. Ginzburg presented a careful of articles in Eros, including works written by renowned authors like Guy de Maupassant and Allen Ginsberg, while giving out social activism messages such as liberation from excess repression, desacralising democratisation of art, race equality, anti-war and so on. The design of Eros by Herb Lubalin has also made it a work of art "suitable for coffee table". It has a format printed on both matte and glossy paper, and with hardback covers. Art that addressed the extent to which the erotic was a theme, throughout the ages, by painters and sculptors, were shown in Eros, along with layouts for photographic portfolios by modern photographers.

The publication was bound in cardboard in a 13" x 10" format, averaging about 90 pages in length. Only four issues of Eros were published. Ginzburg attempted to get mailing privileges from postmasters at Blue Ball and Intercourse, Pennsylvania, but was declined because the anticipated volume was more than what the post office of these two small towns could handle, and therefore at last Ginzburg settled to send his magazines from Middlesex, New Jersey.

The third (Autumn, 1962) issue of Eros published of a collection of nude pictures of Marilyn Monroe, taken by the Bert Stern during the shoot famously known as "The Last Sitting" six weeks before she died, and those photos were among the most famous Monroe images ever recorded. This caused an obscenity lawsuit against Ginzburg by then U.S. Attorney General, Robert Kennedy. The magazine sold nearly 150,000 copies of this issue. The reason for the lawsuit was the claim that the magazine had violated federal anti-obscenity laws. Ginzburg was convicted and sentenced to five years in prison, but he remained in prison for eight months. Following this incident the magazine was closed down.

In 2017 Mindy Seu created a website which contains the digital copies of Eros.

=== Issues ===
==== No. 1 (Spring, 1962) ====
The cover was mustard-coloured and featured "an embossed playing card of Bluebeard and one of his maids". The issue included short stories by Ray Bradbury and Guy de Maupassant, an extract from Eric Partridge's "vulgar dictionary" and poems by John Wilmot, 2nd Earl of Rochester.

==== No. 2 (Summer, 1962) ====
The cover of No. 2 pictured a young couple in swimsuits, kissing passionately; it was printed in two colours, black and greenish-yellow, with a red-orange logo. The inside covers repeated the theme in red (front) and blue (back). It featured photo essays about John F Kennedy, French prostitutes and erotic statues in India, the first publication in a magazine of Mark Twain's short story "1601" and "an antique patent submission for a male chastity belt".

==== No. 3 (Autumn, 1962) ====
Issue No. 3 was centred on an 18-page photo shoot of the recently deceased Marilyn Monroe (the pictures were taken by Bert Stern six weeks before her death). It also featured a piece by Bonnie Prudden, an extract from Fanny Hill and an article on Samuel Roth.

==== No. 4 (Winter, 1962) ====
This issue published a letter by Allen Ginsberg, a profile of Frank Harris, and 'an eight-page "photographic tone poem"' titled "Black and White in Color", featuring a nude couple, but with no pubic parts shown, with an African-American man and a European-American girl. It has been contended that the magazine was persecuted on racist grounds, under the wave of mass racial violence in the South of the United States, and that there would have been no such persecution if the photos had featured a couple of the same color.

== Legacy ==
Eros magazine is significant in American publishing history as it covered and helped to incite the sexual revolution, while it also contributed to the formation of counter-culture in the late 1960s.
