= MotorWeek =

American public television program

- MotorWeek Logo
- Genre: Automotive
- Created by: John Davis
- Starring: John Davis; Greg Carloss; Stephanie Hart; Zach Maskell; Yolanda Vazquez (past); Joyce Braga (past); Elizabeth A. Nardone (past); Charlotte Nichols (past); Craig Singhaus (past); Lisa Barrow (past); Jennifer Khasnabis (past); Anquionette Crosby (past); Jessica Choksey (past); Henry Kopacz (past); Pat Goss (past)
- Country of origin: United States
- Original language: English
- No. of seasons: 43
- No. of episodes: 1,929

Production
- Executive producer: John Davis
- Production location: Owings Mills, Maryland
- Running time: 30 minutes

Original release
- Network: PBS
- Release: October 15, 1981 – present

MotorWeek is an American television news magazine program that focuses on the automotive industry. The program is produced by Maryland Public Television for PBS, and airs on MAVTV. As of September 2025, MotorWeek is underwritten by online tire retailer Tire Rack and the Aftermarket Auto Parts Alliance through its Auto Value and Bumper to Bumper brands.

MotorWeek premiered on October 15, 1981, and has been hosted by John Davis since its inception; Davis also created the series for what was then the Maryland Center for Public Broadcasting and serves at its executive producer.

From its inception until 1987, the program’s main segments emanated from Studio A at Maryland Public Television in Owings Mills, Maryland. Since 1987, all taping of the main segments have been done outdoors in various locales. From 1988 to 1993, the program carried the year to its title, becoming MotorWeek ‘XX, coinciding its seasons with the North American new car model year.

Originally airing new, thirty-minute episodes for twenty-six weeks a year, MotorWeek airs new episodes year-round on both PBS and MAVTV. The show is also syndicated internationally through the American Forces Network.

== Syndication ==
On September 11, 1993, at the start of Season 13 (1993–1994), MotorWeek began syndicating to commercial TV stations, and was first syndicated by ITC Entertainment from 1993 to 1998. Since 1998, it has also aired other commercial cable channels like Speedvision, Speed Channel, Velocity, Velocity by Discovery, the Spanish-language network V-me, and Motor Trend.

== Synopsis ==
Each year, MotorWeek puts more than 150 new cars, trucks, and SUVs to the test, providing consumer-oriented vehicle reviews. Its video Road Test segments focus on performance, technology, practicality and dollar value, and feature MotorWeek's exclusive energy efficient rating system which compares each vehicle’s fuel economy to the best-rated vehicle in its class. The MotorWeek team included master technician Pat Goss (1941–2022) who brought viewers practical advice for keeping cars on the road and out of the shop. Reporters present timely reports on consumer trends, safety issues and the environment, along with innovative, offbeat stories on the automotive world gone extreme. Beginning in 1983, MotorWeek launched its Drivers’ Choice Awards which are among the auto industry’s most prestigious honors. The Drivers’ Choice Awards are unique for their consumer focus and represent the definitive list of best automotive picks in the most popular vehicle categories, including the coveted “Best of the Year” award. They are presented annually during the Chicago Auto Show. Beginning in season 26 (2005–2006), MotorWeek began broadcasting in widescreen and in season 29 (2008-2009) began broadcasting in 1080i HDTV.

== Episodes ==
MotorWeek started on October 15, 1981, and has run for 45 seasons. The show has produced 1,929 episodes with road tests, comparison tests, first impressions, and more. They post older episodes and clips onto YouTube with the Retro Review name. In the first six seasons, they produced 26 episodes each season. Since the seventh season, the show runs year-round for 52 episodes a year. Complete episodes are available on PBS by donations.

== Podcasts ==
MotorWeek started its podcast on September 3, 2008. The podcast is an extension of the show in which the show's crew expresses opinions, as well as discusses new and upcoming vehicles.

== Active segments ==
=== Road test ===
One of the main staples of MotorWeek is the Road Test, where the team of testers puts a new car through various conditions to see how it operates.

Over the years, MotorWeek has conducted its basic tests at various venues. In the show’s early years, testing was primarily done at either Martin State Airport in Baltimore, using one of the airport’s seaplane tarmacs. MotorWeek also had access to a stretch of unfinished highway at an indeterminate location outside of Baltimore in its early days. One location was the west bound lanes of Interstate 70 from the terminus in Catonsville headed towards I-695. Another location used later was I-795 before it was opened.

Eventually, MotorWeek settled on the 75-80 Dragway in Frederick, Maryland as its primary testing facility. The show used the quarter-mile drag strip up until the end of its 39th season; during much of that time, MotorWeek had the only access to the track as it had closed multiple times for competition, the grandstands were eventually removed, and property maintenance was virtually nonexistent by the end. For season 40 and beyond, MotorWeek has used the Mason-Dixon Dragway in Boonsboro, Maryland as its test track.

In the winter months, the show relocates the testing to Roebling Road Raceway in Savannah, Georgia. MotorWeek has also done tests at the Ford and General Motors proving grounds in the past as well as at several famous racetracks such as Pocono Raceway in Long Pond, Pennsylvania, Charlotte Motor Speedway in Concord, North Carolina, and Mid-Ohio Sports Car Course near Lexington, Ohio, and Road Atlanta in Braselton, Georgia.

Each test starts with an overview of the car’s engine and features, as well as other options that are available. This portion is comprehensive, ranging from how much power the engine has to how the interior of the car is set up.

The car is then taken out onto the drag strip. Here, tests are done to measure its zero-to-sixty time, how long it takes to traverse the quarter-mile drag strip, how the car handles a slalom course, how it handles quick turns, and how much distance it takes for the car to come to a complete stop from 60 miles per hour. A test is also done to determine fuel economy ratings against the ones provided by the Environmental Protection Agency; to perform this, the testers use a 100-mile loop that combines city and highway driving and averages their figures. Since 2008, the environmental impacts of vehicles (specifically their carbon footprints and their oil usage) are also included in the discussion.

Older episodes also tested a car’s speed at 500 feet to simulate entering a highway as well as its turning diameter.

Once the road test is complete, the car’s hits and misses are revealed as are the reasons why the testers felt a certain way about various issues. The car’s costs to the consumer are revealed at the very end of the segment, including what the vehicle would cost with various option packages.

=== Comparison test ===
For many years, MotorWeek has conducted periodic competitive tests to determine what cars, in their opinion, are the top in a certain classification. In recent years these tests have been done in conjunction with cars.com.

For these instances, the team will choose a series of vehicles, usually six, that fit into the category (for example, compact sport utility vehicles). The vehicles, like every other tested by MotorWeek, are supplied by the manufacturers themselves and each must adhere to the set of criteria selected for the competition (for example, transmission type or maximum cost).

After the cars are put through a battery of tests, their performances are graded and the top four performing vehicles in the category are revealed in order from lowest to highest, with specific highlights such as price or fuel mileage noted.

=== Other segments ===
- Quick Spin: Take a quick spin on new vehicles.
- Two Wheelin': A two wheel review on motorcycles.
- First Drive: A first look at new vehicles.
- Muscle Car Memories: A wide variety of vintage, classic, and memorable muscle cars.
- Car of the Week: Featuring a photo album of automobiles sent in by viewers.
- Long Term Test Update: News on cars loaned to MotorWeek for tests, usually for one year.
- MotorNews: An in-depth report on new and upcoming vehicles.
- Over The Edge: An automotive industry on overdrive. Replaced Craig Singhaus' "Taking the High Road" segment.
- FYI: Featuring an in-depth report on consumer trending.
- Retro Review: A look back at MotorWeek reviews from past seasons.
- Eye Spy: Featuring photographic closeups of automobiles.
- Your Drive: An automotive car care segment hosted by Audra Fordin, Logan McCombs and Dan Maffett. The segment was created in season 42 (2022–23) to replace Goss' Garage following Pat Goss' death earlier in 2022.

== Discontinued/renamed segments ==
=== Goss' Garage ===
Goss’ Garage was a staple of MotorWeek for its first 41 seasons. Originally called “Motorshop” and featuring Craig Singhaus (who would later host the Taking the High Road segments) as the main maintenance expert in its pilot, the producers approached Washington, DC area mechanic Pat Goss to appear and show viewers solutions to common issues that one might face with their vehicle at one time or another. Initially the segments were aimed more at do-it-yourself type repairs, but as the years went on and technology in cars evolved Goss shifted the focus from knowing how to perform a repair to being more aware of the inner workings of their vehicles and knowing what to do and ask for at the repair shop.

Goss died on March 19, 2022. At the time of his death, there were three Goss’ Garage segments that had been recorded but had not aired yet. Host John Davis announced that out of respect to Goss, the Goss’ Garage segment would be retired but the remaining segments would air in his honor. The final Goss’ Garage segment that Goss recorded aired on the weekend of April 16, 2022, and a tribute to him and his work aired the following weekend. No further car care segments were made for the remainder of season 41. For season 42, Goss' Garage was replaced by a new car care segment under the name Your Drive.

=== Other segments ===
- The Exotics Spot: Reviewing older vehicles.
- What's New on Wheels: A close look at new products on the automotive scene. Renamed to MotorNews.
- Taking the High Road: Featuring automobiles from the past and present. Renamed to Over the Edge.
- Stomp, Stay, and Steer: John Davis teaches viewers on how to properly panic stop a vehicle equipped with Anti-Lock Brakes.
- A Quick Look: Featuring a quick look at new vehicles.
- Behind The Wall: The MotorWeek staff takes behind the wall for their high speed driving skills.
- Car of the Week: Pictures of classic/historical cars sent in by viewers.
- Our View: Opinions and commentary on the automotive landscape be the staff.

== Theme music ==
From the show's premiere in 1981 until 1987, MotorWeek's original theme music was composed by Don Barto. In Season 7 (1987–88), Mark Roumelis took over as music composer. The unaired pilot also featured music from Mark Roumelis, but it is different from the piece he made for the 1987–88 season; this piece has undergone a few updates since.

== Sets ==
When MotorWeek premiered in 1981, the show emanated from Studio A at MPT on a set which featured various car related decorations and also had room for a featured automobile to be displayed; the set was changed in 1985. Beginning in 1987, the show stopped using the studio and began filming all of the car display segments outdoors.

== Track ==
As mentioned above, from late 1981 to early 2021, MotorWeek conducted most of its testing on a drag strip that was known as the 75-80 Dragway (also Dragaway) in Frederick, Maryland. While the track itself closed for competition in 2005 (only to reopen in 2009) and again in 2013, MotorWeek continued to have access to the drag strip. By 2020, the 40th season of the program, only the strip and a portion of the starter’s stand remained; the grandstands were removed sometime in 2019. In 2021, the show moved their road tests to Mason Dixon Dragway in Boonsboro.
