= John Davis (television personality) =

American television presenter

John Harwood Davis is an American television producer and presenter who works for Maryland Public Television in Owings Mills, Maryland. He is best known for being the host of the weekly PBS series MotorWeek, which he created for the network in 1981, where he has served as the senior executive producer and host since its inception. In addition to his work on MotorWeek, Davis was also senior executive producer of the long running Wall Street Week during the era where Louis Rukeyser hosted. He has been with Maryland Public Television since 1973. In 2008 he received the Board of Governors Emmy Award for his role as creator, host and executive producer of MotorWeek, and for executive producing Wall Street Week with Louis Rukeyser. Davis is a graduate of North Carolina State University, with a BS in mechanical and aerospace engineering, and earned a master's degree from The University of North Carolina in business administration.

After Craig Singhaus’ retirement in 2006 and Pat Goss' death in 2022, Davis is the last of Motorweek's original team.
