= Carchex =

American automotive company

- Type: Privately held company LLC
- Industry: Automotive
- Founded: 1999; 27 years ago
- Headquarters: Baltimore, Maryland, United States
- Area served: United States
- Key people: Jason Goldsmith (CEO)
- Products: Pre-purchase vehicle inspections, vehicle service contracts
- Website: www.carchex.com

CARCHEX is an American company that provides extended auto warranties and mobile vehicle inspections. The company is headquartered in Baltimore, Maryland and provides services across all 50 states in the US through a network of authorised mechanics.

== History ==
CARCHEX was founded in 1999 as a provider of pre-purchase vehicle inspections. In 2003, the company was purchased by Jason Goldsmith, a Baltimore-based entrepreneur and founder of TheLoanPage.com. Shortly afterward, CARCHEX expanded its vehicle inspection service to all 50 states by partnering with a nationwide network of ASE-certified mechanics.

In 2004, CARCHEX added a second consumer assurance product to its business by offering vehicle service contracts (VSCs), also known as extended warranties. The company expanded the service in 2007 as a warranty remarketing program conducted on behalf of dealership groups such as MileOne. The company has an A+ rating from the Better Business Bureau.

In 2014, CARCHEX announced a partnership with Mothers Against Drunk Driving (MADD). As part of the partnership, CARCHEX donated $20,000 to the organization to help prevent underage drinking and eliminate drunk driving.

== Recognition ==
Carchex was named one of the "Baltimore Sun Top Workplaces" for 2011, 2012, 2013, and 2014.

Carchex CEO Jason Goldsmith received the 2008 Maryland Ernst & Young Entrepreneur of the Year Award.
