= Venezuela Solidarity Campaign =

British political organisation

- Formation: 2005
- Headquarters: 33-37 Moreland Street, London EC1V 8BB
- Honorary President: Ken Livingstone
- Secretary: Dr Francisco Domínguez
- Website: www.venezuelasolidarity.co.uk

Venezuela Solidarity Campaign is a British political organisation which expresses support to the Bolivarian Revolution and campaigns against its opponents. Its Scottish section is known as the Scottish Venezuela Solidarity Campaign (SVSC).

== Aims ==
According to the campaign, its aims are:

- To defend Venezuela's sovereignty and independence.
- To support the right of the Venezuelan people to determine their own future free from external intervention.
- To provide accurate and up-to-date information in support of democracy and social progress in Venezuela.
- To defend the achievements of the Bolivarian Revolution.
- To support and build activity around these objectives throughout Britain, within parliament, regional and local government, the trade unions, amongst women, lesbian and gay communities, black, Asian and Latin American communities, students and all others.

== Activities ==
The VSC was established in 2005 in response to an attempted military coup against the then President of Venezuela, Hugo Chávez. It sought to promote and strengthen links between trade unionists in Britain and Venezuela, organised solidarity tours to Venezuela, and promoted awareness of the Bolivarian Revolution through a DVD, The Revolution will not be Televised. From 2009 the group promoted another documentary DVD, Inside the Revolution: A Journey into the Heart of Venezuela, directed by Pablo Navarrete.

Following the death of Chávez in 2013, the campaign continued its work in support of his successor as president, Nicolás Maduro. The activities of the VSC and SVSC in 2015–16 included maintaining websites with extensive information about the situation in Venezuela; organising conferences, lectures and other events; publishing a magazine, Viva Venezuela!; maintaining a social media presence, and seeking to influence parliamentarians and others.

== Key people ==
=== Honorary president ===
- Ken Livingstone, former Labour MP and Mayor of London (2000–2008)

=== Patrons ===
- Diane Abbott, Labour MP for Hackney North and Stoke Newington
- Kelvin Hopkins, former Labour MP for Luton North
- Bruce Kent, political activist and former Priest
- Ann Pettifor, academic

=== Former patrons (due to decease) ===
- Rodney Bickerstaffe was a patron until his death in 2017.

== Affiliates ==
Trade union bodies affiliated to the VSC include the Southern and Eastern TUC (SERTUC), Yorkshire and Humberside TUC and Camden Trades Council. Individual unions affiliated include Unite the Union, the University and College Union, the National Union of Teachers, the Public and Commercial Services Union, ASLEF, BECTU, BFAWU, CWU, FBU, GMB, MU, Napo, NUM, PCS, RMT, TSSA, UCATT, UCU, Unite the Union and UNISON.

Trade union affiliates to the SVSC include the STUC, CWU, EIS, GMB, RMT, UNISON, Unite the Union, and Trades Councils in Dundee, Kilmarnock & Loudon and Midlothian.
