= 1966 in art =

Events from the year 1966 in art.

== Events ==
- May 19–September 19 – Display of prints by Victorian artist Aubrey Beardsley at the Victoria and Albert Museum, London; in July it is threatened with prosecution for obscenity.
- July – The Chicago Surrealist Group is founded by Franklin and Penelope Rosemont with others.
- September – American pop artist Jim Dine is found guilty of exhibiting indecent works at Robert Fraser's gallery in London.
- September 27 – New Whitney Museum of American Art on Madison Avenue in New York City, designed by Marcel Breuer with Hamilton P. Smith, is opened.
- October 13–23 – The second New York City Armory Show 9 Evenings: Theatre and Engineering sponsored by E.A.T. – Experiments in Art and Technology.
- November 3/4 – 1966 flood of the Arno in Florence causes severe damage to artworks.
- December 30/31 – Eight paintings are stolen from Dulwich Picture Gallery in London, but are recovered locally within a week.
- The Hairy Who, a group of surrealist iconoclasts later called the Chicago Imagists, first exhibit at the Hyde Park Art Center in Chicago. They will be the most important art movement to come out of Chicago in the 1960s.
- Retrospective exhibition of Marcel Duchamp organized by Richard Hamilton at the Tate Gallery, London, the only comprehensive exhibition of the artist's work in the United Kingdom as of 2006.
- Stass Paraskos Obscenity Trial: Painter Stass Paraskos is found guilty of exhibiting obscene artworks in Leeds, England.
- Artist Placement Group set up in the United Kingdom.

== Exhibitions ==
- September 24 until November 27 - Systemic Painting (curated by Lawrence Alloway) at the Solomon R. Guggenheim Museum in New York City.
- April 27 until June 12 - Primary Structures at the Jewish Museum in New York City.

== Awards ==
- Archibald Prize: Jon Molvig – Charles Blackman

== Works ==
- Carl Andre
  - Equivalent VIII ("The Bricks"; minimalist sculpture)
  - Lever
- Francis Bacon – Three Studies for a Portrait of Muriel Belcher
- Pauline Boty – BUM
- Lou Dorfsman – Gastrotypographicalassemblage (wood typography for CBS Building, New York)
- Marcel Duchamp – Étant donnés (tableau)
- Sorel Etrog – Embrace
- Barbara Hepworth – Elegy III (bronze)
- David Hockney
  - In the dull village (etching and aquatint)
  - Peter Getting Out of Nick's Pool
- Edward Hopper - Two Comedians
- Roy Lichtenstein – Yellow and Green Brushstrokes
- Malcolm Morley - SS Amsterdam in Front of Rotterdam
- Yoko Ono - Ceiling Painting/Yes Painting
- William Underhill – Ursa Major (sculpture)
- Andy Warhol – Since (film)

== Births ==
- 12 January – Rob Zombie, born Robert Cummings, American artist and musician
- 31 January – Christian Cardell Corbet, Canadian portrait sculptor, painter and art historian
- 10 March – Fernando Gaspar, Portuguese visual artist
- 20 April – Bio, born Wilfredo Feliciano, American graffiti artist
- 4 October – Angus Fairhurst, Young British Artist, installation, photography and video artist (d.2008)
- 11 October - Costas Picadas, Greek painter, sculptor, and mixed-media artist
- 12 December – Lydia Zimmermann, Spanish filmmaker and video artist

=== Full date unknown ===
- Jodi Bieber, South African photographer
- Jeremy Deller, English conceptual, video and installation artist, Turner Prize winner
- Rankin, British photographer
- George Shaw, English realist painter
- Cathy Wilkes, British multimedia artist

== Deaths ==
- January 6 – Jean Lurçat, French painter and designer (b. 1892)
- January 11 – Alberto Giacometti, Swiss surrealist sculptor and painter (b. 1901)
- February 17 – Hans Hofmann, German American abstract expressionist painter and teacher (b. 1880)
- March 4 – Stanley Anderson, English engraver (b. 1884)
- March 30 – Maxfield Parrish, American painter and illustrator (b. 1870)
- April 3 – Battista Farina, Italian car designer (b. 1893)
- April 12 – Wilhelm Schnarrenberger, German painter (b. 1892)
- April 13 – Carlo Carrà, Italian painter (b. 1881)
- May 30 – Wäinö Aaltonen, Finnish sculptor (b. 1894)
- June 7 – Jean Arp, German-French-Swiss painter and sculptor (b. 1886)
- July 1 – Pauline Boty, English pop art painter (b. 1938)
- July 10 – Malvina Hoffman, American sculptor (b. 1885?)
- July 29 – Edward Gordon Craig, English theatrical designer (b. 1872)
- August 2 or 3 – Tristan Klingsor (Léon Leclère), French poet, painter and musician (b. 1874)
- August 16 – Gavriil Gorelov, Russian painter (b. 1880)
- November 23 – Alvin Langdon Coburn, British pictorialist photographer (b. 1882)
- December 20 – Matvey Manizer, Russian sculptor (b. 1891)
- Duncan Phillips, American art collector and critic (b. 1886)

== See also ==
- 1966 in Fine Arts of the Soviet Union
