= Ursa Major (disambiguation) =

Ursa Major (Latin 'great bear') is an area of the sky, a constellation.

Ursa Major may also refer to:

- Big Dipper, a pattern of stars (an asterism) within the constellation
- Ursa Major I Dwarf and Ursa Major II Dwarf, two nearby dwarf spherical galaxies visible in the constellation
- Ursa Major (Third Eye Blind album), 2009
- Ursa Major (Eleventh Dream Day album), 1994
- Ursa Major (character), a fictional character
- Ursa Major, a character from the My Little Pony: Friendship Is Magic episode Boast Busters
- Ursa Major (excavator), a piece of mining equipment
- Ursa Major (sculpture), by William Underhill
- Ursa Major Technologies, an American aerospace company
- MV Ursa Major, a Russian ship that sank in the Mediterranean

== See also ==
- Flag of Alaska with Ursa Major
