= Alex Calderwood =

American hotelier (1966–2013)

Alex Calderwood (January 28, 1966 – November 14, 2013) was an American hotelier who founded the Ace Hotel.

== Biography ==
Calderwood was born in Denver to a contractor and a newspaper columnist. After forgoing college, he worked as a party promoter and operated a vintage clothing business in Seattle.

In the early 1990s, Calderwood and a partner invested $12,000 to revitalize a traditional barbershop concept, creating Rudy's, a chain that eventually expanded to more than a dozen locations. It led to lease of a 28-room flophouse in a neglected section of Seattle, which they converted into the first Ace Hotel.

Over time, Ace Hotels opened in Portland, New York City, Palm Springs, and London, with additional locations planned for Panama City and Los Angeles at the time of Calderwood's death. The hotels often included restaurants and cafes highlighting farm-to-table and nose-to-tail dining, as well as in-house DJs and, in some cases, guitars in the rooms. Calderwood and his partners later separated due to disagreements.

Known for his interest in graphic designers such as Lou Dorfsman and Milton Glaser, Calderwood often wore jeans, T-shirts, and Converse sneakers, and objected to the "hipster" label frequently applied to him and his hotels.
