= 1966 in fine arts of the Soviet Union =

The year 1966 was marked by many events that left an imprint on the history of Soviet and Russian Fine Arts.

== Events ==
- Guaranteed wage for artists for the first time introduced in Leningrad. Its size was 150-200 rubles a month, roughly in line with the average wage in the industry. This innovation was seized about 500 visual artists of all disciplines.
- Exhibition of young leningrad artists opened in the Leningrad Union of Artists.
- Autumn Exhibition of leningrad artists of 1966 year opened in the Leningrad Union of Artists.

== Deaths ==
- March 7 — Samuil Adlivankin (Russian: Адливанкин Самуил Яковлевич), Russian soviet graphic artists (born 1897).
- March 29 — Vladimir Ingal (Russian: Ингал Владимир Иосифович), soviet sculptor, Honored art worker of Russian Federation, Stalin Prize winner (born 1901).
- August 16 — Gavriil Gorelov (Russian: Горелов Гавриил Никитич), Russian soviet painter Горелов Гавриил Никитич (Никитьевич), русский советский живописец, Honored art worker of Russian Federation, Stalin Prize winner (born 1880).
- December 20 — Matvey Manizer (Russian: Манизер Матвей Генрихович), soviet sculptor, People's Artist of the USSR, Stalin Prize winner (born 1891).
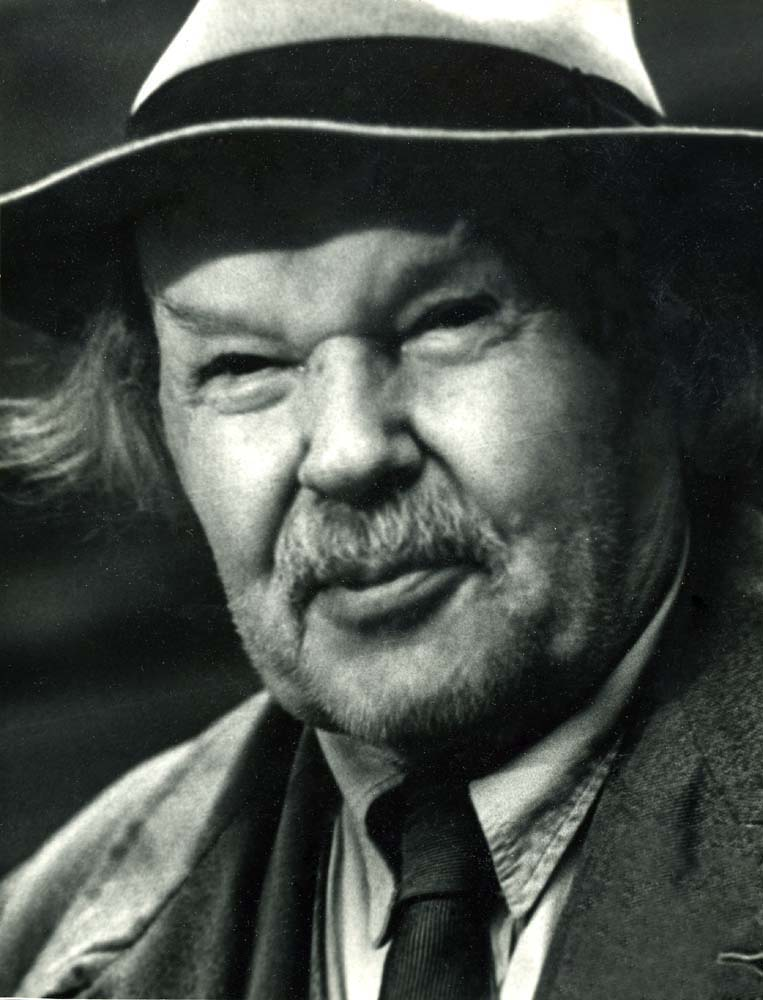
Gavriil Gorelov

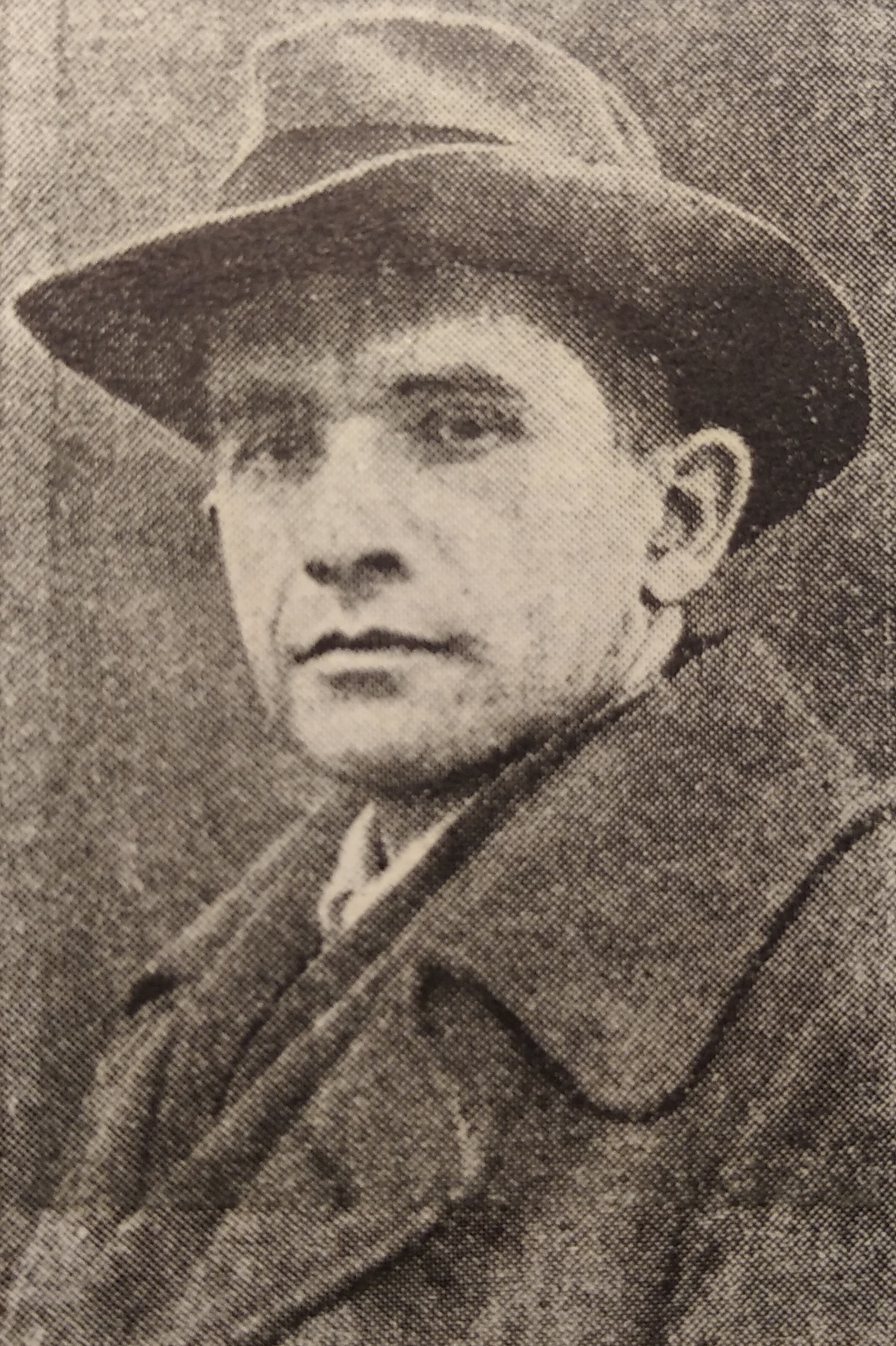
Matvey Manizer

== See also ==
- List of Russian artists
- List of painters of Leningrad Union of Artists
- Saint Petersburg Union of Artists
- Russian culture

== Sources ==
- Дмитренко А., Фёдорова Н. А где же молодость? О «Выставке молодых» // Смена, 1966, 11 ноября.
- Artists of Peoples of the USSR. Biography Dictionary. Vol. 1. Moscow, Iskusstvo, 1970.
- Artists of Peoples of the USSR. Biography Dictionary. Vol. 2. Moscow, Iskusstvo, 1972.
- Directory of Members of Union of Artists of USSR. Volume 1,2. Moscow, Soviet Artist Edition, 1979.
- Directory of Members of the Leningrad branch of the Union of Artists of Russian Federation. Leningrad, Khudozhnik RSFSR, 1980.
- Artists of Peoples of the USSR. Biography Dictionary. Vol. 4 Book 1. Moscow, Iskusstvo, 1983.
- Directory of Members of the Leningrad branch of the Union of Artists of Russian Federation. - Leningrad: Khudozhnik RSFSR, 1987.
- Artists of peoples of the USSR. Biography Dictionary. Vol. 4 Book 2. - Saint Petersburg: Academic project humanitarian agency, 1995.
- Link of Times: 1932 - 1997. Artists - Members of Saint Petersburg Union of Artists of Russia. Exhibition catalogue. - Saint Petersburg: Manezh Central Exhibition Hall, 1997.
- Matthew C. Bown. Dictionary of 20th Century Russian and Soviet Painters 1900-1980s. London, Izomar, 1998.
- Vern G. Swanson. Soviet Impressionism. Woodbridge, England, Antique Collectors' Club, 2001.
- Время перемен. Искусство 1960—1985 в Советском Союзе. СПб., Государственный Русский музей, 2006.
- Sergei V. Ivanov. Unknown Socialist Realism. The Leningrad School. Saint-Petersburg, NP-Print Edition, 2007. ISBN 5-901724-21-6, ISBN 978-5-901724-21-7.
- Anniversary Directory graduates of Saint Petersburg State Academic Institute of Painting, Sculpture, and Architecture named after Ilya Repin, Russian Academy of Arts. 1915 - 2005. Saint Petersburg: Pervotsvet Publishing House, 2007.
