= Linn Underhill =

American photographer (1936–2019)

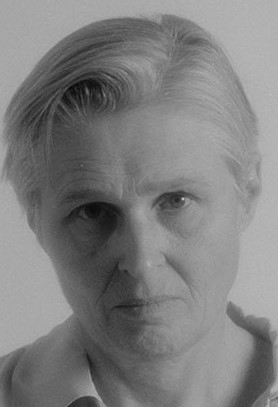
- Linn Underhill
- Born: Linn Baldwin; August 8, 1936; Sutter Creek, California
- Died: May 3, 2019 (aged 82); Lisle, New York
- Education: B.F.A., 1978, Alfred University M.F.A., 1982, Visual Studies Workshop, SUNY Buffalo
- Known for: Photography, Artist's Books

Linn Underhill (August 8, 1936 – May 3, 2019) was an American photographer and professor. Underhill was best known for work that challenged cultural and societal conventions of gender identity and sexuality. Her work was considered innovative in its portrayal of women and aging.

== Life ==
Born as Linn Baldwin to Carol and Dwight Baldwin of Lafayette, California, Underhill was encouraged by her father to engage in traditionally masculine pursuits, such as mechanics and hunting. Her father died of cancer when she was 12. As a student of Minor White at the San Francisco Art Institute, she met Ansel Adams, Imogen Cunningham, Dorothea Lange, and Edward Weston, among other photographers then based in the Bay Area. In 1951, she moved to Massachusetts to attend Stockbridge School. Underhill briefly studied architecture at the University of California, Berkeley. Her career was paused for about 15 years after she married William Underhill in 1957 and raised their children. Resuming her career in the mid-1970s with an internship at the George Eastman Museum, she earned her B.F.A. from Alfred University in 1978 and her M.F.A. from SUNY Buffalo in 1982.

After getting her M.F.A., Underhill taught photography at various institutions, including SUNY Binghamton, Cornell University, Ithaca College, and Syracuse University. In 1992, Underhill was appointed to the Department of Art and Art History at Colgate University, where she remained for the rest of her academic career.

Linn Underhill married sculptor William Underhill on June 25, 1957. The couple had three children—Sarah, Joseph, and Katherine. The marriage ended in divorce in 1989 after a lengthy separation. In February 2019, Underhill married her long-time companion, Ann Carter. Underhill and Carter had previously held a commitment ceremony in 1991, before same-sex marriage was recognized in New York. Linn Underhill died of cancer on May 3, 2019.

== Works ==
In 1981, Underhill published "Thirty Five Years / One Week", a visual narrative of the last week of her sister's life. The work used visual images and a typewritten diary, and the effect was described as "highly pictorial, even cinematic in its flow, with dramatic variations from page to page . . . "

Her “Claiming the Gaze” was described as a “successful attempt to rescue the female subject from her typically objectified position within artwork.”

“NoMan’s Land” consisted of a series of self-portraits as various male subjects in the style of George Platt Lynes.

=== Select exhibitions ===
- “Memory/History Grids,” Light Work, Syracuse, NY, 1984
- “Light Work: Photography over the 70s and 80s,” Everson Museum of Art, Syracuse, NY, 1985
- “Reframing the Family,” Artists’ Space, New York, NY, 1991
- “I,” Mednick Gallery, University of the Arts, Philadelphia, PA, 1992
- “Returning the Gaze,” 494 Gallery, New York, NY, 1992
- “Claiming the Gaze,” Work Space Gallery, University of Colorado, Boulder, CO, 1993; SPAS Gallery, Rochester Institute of Technology, Rochester, NY, 1993; Boliou Art Center, Carleton College, Northfield, MN, 1994.
- “Tomboy Suite,” Bucknell University Gallery, Bucknell University, Lewisburg, PA, 1998 and Busch Campus Center, Rutgers University, Piscataway, NJ, 1999
- “Cosmic Dominatrix,” Everson Museum of Art, Syracuse, NY, 2001
- “Of Someone and Something,” Picker Art Gallery, Colgate University, Hamilton, NY, 2010
- “Close to Home,” Clifford Art Gallery, Colgate University, Hamilton, NY, 2014

=== Collections ===
- Fogg Museum, Harvard University, Cambridge, MA
- Light Work Collection, Syracuse, NY

=== Publications ===
- Thirty Five Years / One Week. 1981. Rochester, NY: Visual Studies Workshop. ISBN 0-89822-019-X. OCLC 8462961.
