= CBS Building =

Office skyscraper in Manhattan, New York

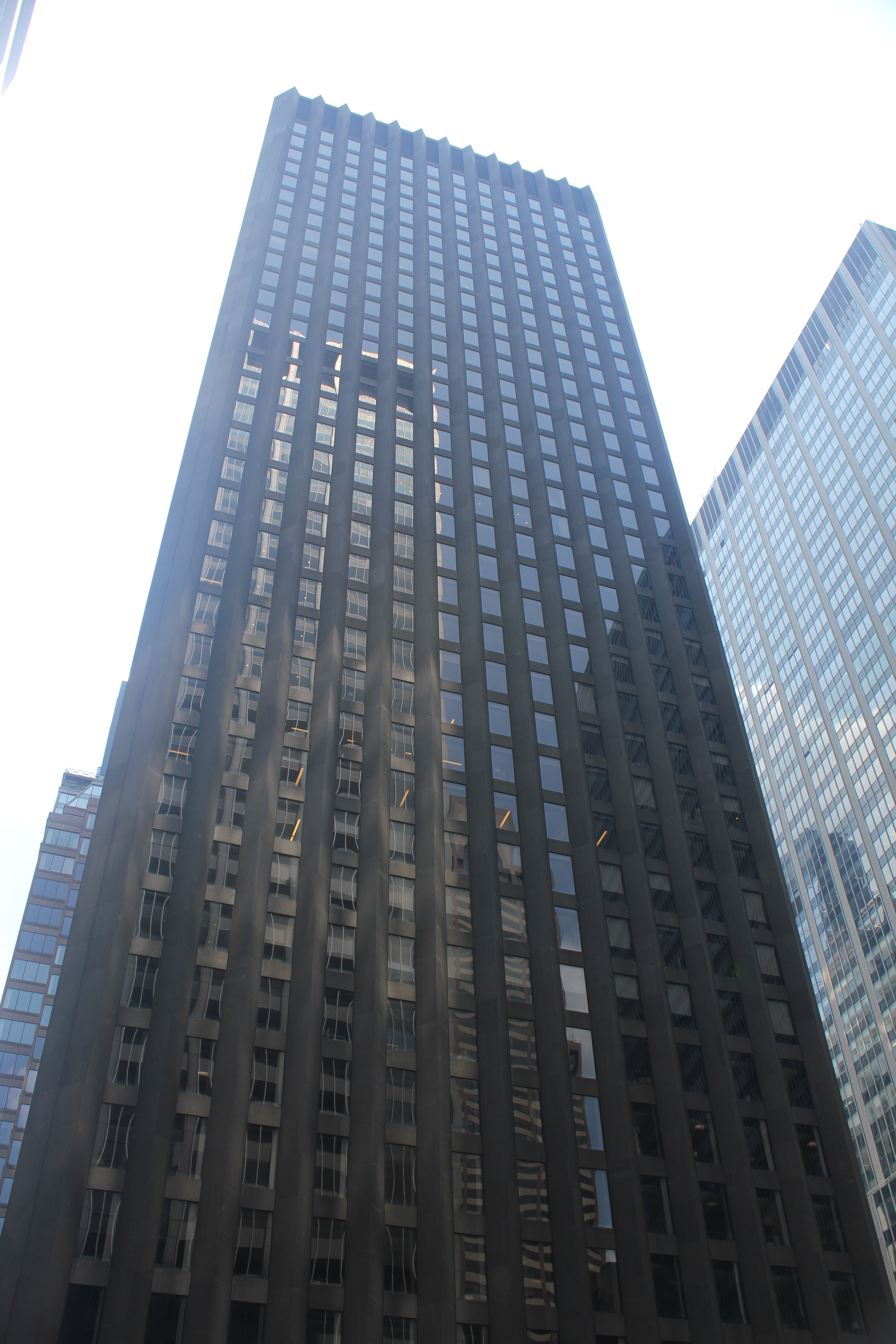
- Alternative names: Black Rock; 51W52

General information
- Type: Office
- Architectural style: Modernist
- Location: 51 West 52nd Street; Manhattan, New York, U.S.
- Coordinates: 40°45′40″N 73°58′44″W
- Current tenants: CBS
- Construction started: 1961
- Completed: 1965
- Owner: Harbor Group International

Height
- Height: 491 feet (150 m)

Technical details
- Floor count: 38

Design and construction
- Architects: Eero Saarinen (main architect); Kevin Roche (associate); John Dinkeloo (associate); Florence Knoll Bassett (furnishings)
- Structural engineer: Paul Weidlinger
- Main contractor: George A. Fuller Company

Website
- 51west52.com

New York City Landmark
- Designated: October 21, 1997
- Reference no.: 1971

The CBS Building, also known as Black Rock and 51W52, is a 38-story, 491-foot-tall (150 m) tower at 51 West 52nd Street in the Midtown Manhattan neighborhood of New York City, New York, U.S. The building was constructed from 1961 to 1964 and was the only skyscraper designed by Eero Saarinen, who referred to the building as the "simplest skyscraper statement in New York". The interior spaces and furnishings were designed by Saarinen and, after his death, Florence Knoll Bassett. Built as the headquarters of the CBS broadcasting network, the building was also the headquarters of CBS Records (later Sony Music Entertainment) before the early 1990s.

The building is located on the eastern side of Sixth Avenue (Avenue of the Americas) between 52nd and 53rd streets, with its main entrances on the side streets. The "Black Rock" nickname is derived from the design of its facade, which consists of angled dark-gray granite piers alternating with dark-tinted glass. The facade was designed to make the building appear as a continuous slab. The building has a gross floor area of approximately 800,000 square feet (74,000 m^{2}). The building's superstructure is made of reinforced concrete, and steel beams are only used below ground; the concrete frame uses polyurethane insulation.

The design was finalized in 1961, and, despite Saarinen's death shortly afterward, construction started in 1962. The first employees moved into the building in late 1964 and it was completed the following year. The building initially served as the headquarters of CBS, which occupied all the above-ground space until the early 1990s, when it started leasing some stories to other tenants. The New York City Landmarks Preservation Commission designated the CBS Building as a city landmark in 1997. CBS attempted to sell the building twice between 1998 and 2001, and ViacomCBS again attempted to sell it in early 2020. Harbor Group International agreed to buy the structure in August 2021 and renovated it in 2023.

== Site ==
The CBS Building is at 51 West 52nd Street in the Midtown Manhattan neighborhood of New York City, New York, U.S. It is on the eastern side of Sixth Avenue (officially Avenue of the Americas) between 52nd and 53rd streets. The lot covers 47,725 square feet (4,433.8 m^{2}). (Note: Pelkonen & Albrecht 2006, p. 219, cites the building as having a lot of 47,696 square feet (4,431.1 m^{2}).) The site has a frontage of 255 feet (78 m) on 52nd Street to the south, with a depth of 200 feet (61 m) between 52nd and 53rd streets. Nearby buildings include the Credit Lyonnais Building to the west, the New York Hilton Midtown to the northwest, 53W53 to the north, the Museum of Modern Art (MoMA) to the northeast, the 53rd Street Library and 21 Club to the east, and 75 Rockefeller Plaza to the southeast. The CBS Building stands directly above a New York City Subway tunnel connecting the Sixth Avenue and 53rd Street subway lines. (Note: This tunnel is used by the F and <F> trains as of 2025. It curves between the 47th–50th Streets–Rockefeller Center station to the south and the Fifth Avenue/53rd Street station to the east.)

The building, developed for broadcasting company CBS, was designed to occupy only 60 percent of its site. It is three blocks north of Rockefeller Center, the headquarters of CBS's rival NBC. By the late 1950s, the midtown section of Sixth Avenue was being developed with office towers and hotels, including the Hilton hotel, the Time-Life Building, and the Equitable Building at 1285 Avenue of the Americas. The CBS Building had replaced five apartment buildings of four stories each, as well as a 25,000-square-foot (2,300 m^{2}) parking lot. CBS had acquired these structures in July 1960 from developer William Zeckendorf, who had been forced to sell the site to pay off increasing debts.

== Architecture ==
The CBS Building was designed by Eero Saarinen, whose other designs ranged from the Gateway Arch, the General Motors Technical Center, and the Dulles International Airport Main Terminal to chairs for the Knoll company. The George A. Fuller Company was the general contractor for the project. Cosentini Associates was the mechanical engineer, while Paul Weidlinger was the structural engineer. Carson, Lundin & Shaw planned the interior layout of the building, designing the mechanical systems and interior partitions. Acoustical engineer Paul Veneklasen advised the firm on how to design different spaces in the building, based on varying acoustical requirements for different divisions. The furnishings were manufactured by Florence Knoll Bassett, whom Saarinen had invited to the project shortly before his death in 1961. CBS's design director Lou Dorfsman and president Frank Stanton worked with Knoll to arrange the art in the building.

The building measures 135 by 160 feet (41 by 49 m) and is 491 feet (150 m) tall, with 38 stories. It does not contain any setbacks on intermediate levels. The building is recessed 25 feet (7.6 m) from the lot line on the north, west, and south and is recessed the same distance from an auxiliary building to the east. A separate structure with a loading area was provided east of the building, allowing the main structure to be a standalone slab. The building's massing evoked those of earlier standalone buildings, such as the unbuilt Tribune Tower design by Eero Saarinen's father Eliel, as well as Louis Sullivan's Guaranty Building. By contrast, the uniform treatment of the CBS Building's facade differed from these earlier designs, which were divided horizontally into three sections.

=== Plaza ===
Surrounding the building is a plaza that is about 3.5 feet (1.1 m) below the Sixth Avenue sidewalk. It is reached by a flight of five steps from that street. The eastern part of the plaza is slightly lower, being six steps below 52nd Street and seven steps below 53rd Street. The plaza contains Canadian black granite pavers, the same material used in the facade. In contrast to the nearly contemporary Seagram Building, which had a decorative plaza with fountains and plants, the CBS Building's plaza was designed solely as a backdrop for the tower. Consequently, the plaza was not designed with seating, and there were no storefronts at plaza level. Before his death, Saarinen had written of his belief that a tower should stand as a solitary mass, detached from shorter buildings.

At the time of the building's construction, New York City planners were considering enacting the 1961 Zoning Resolution, which would allow skyscrapers to have a slab-like shape and additional floor area in exchange for the inclusion of ground-level open spaces. When he was designing the CBS Building, Saarinen had calculated that each story would need to have a floor area of about 20,000 square feet (1,900 m^{2}) to be profitable, even though the new zoning would have allowed only 16,000 square feet (1,500 m^{2}) for each floor. The presence of the plaza around the CBS Building helped influence the content of the zoning resolution, which was passed later in 1961. In the 1980s, an additional plaza was built to the east, connecting 52nd and 53rd streets and separating the CBS Building from EF Hutton's then-new building at 31 West 52nd Street. Large planters were added around the plaza in the 1990s and demolished in the 2020s.

=== Facade ===
The facade consists of 5-foot-wide (1.5 m) vertical concrete piers clad with Canadian black granite, alternating with 5-foot-wide vertical bays of dark-tinted glass. The design was intended to "keep glass areas to a desirable minimum", according to the contractors, while also permitting natural light from multiple angles. John Dinkeloo, one of Saarinen's associates, also believed that dark stone was better than glass at showing strength. At the time of the building's construction, granite was generally associated with strength, while concrete was largely considered comparatively weak. The combination of black-granite piers and dark glass make the CBS Building appear as a granite slab from some angles. The facade led to its nickname "Black Rock", though CBS cites the building's proximity to Rockefeller Center as another influence for the nickname. The piers are triangular, which Architectural Record said made the piers appear as a "continuous accordion pleated granite faced wall" when perceived from a certain angle. Architectural writer Ada Louise Huxtable characterized this effect as "trompe-l'oeil", and Dinkeloo called it an example of "op architecture".

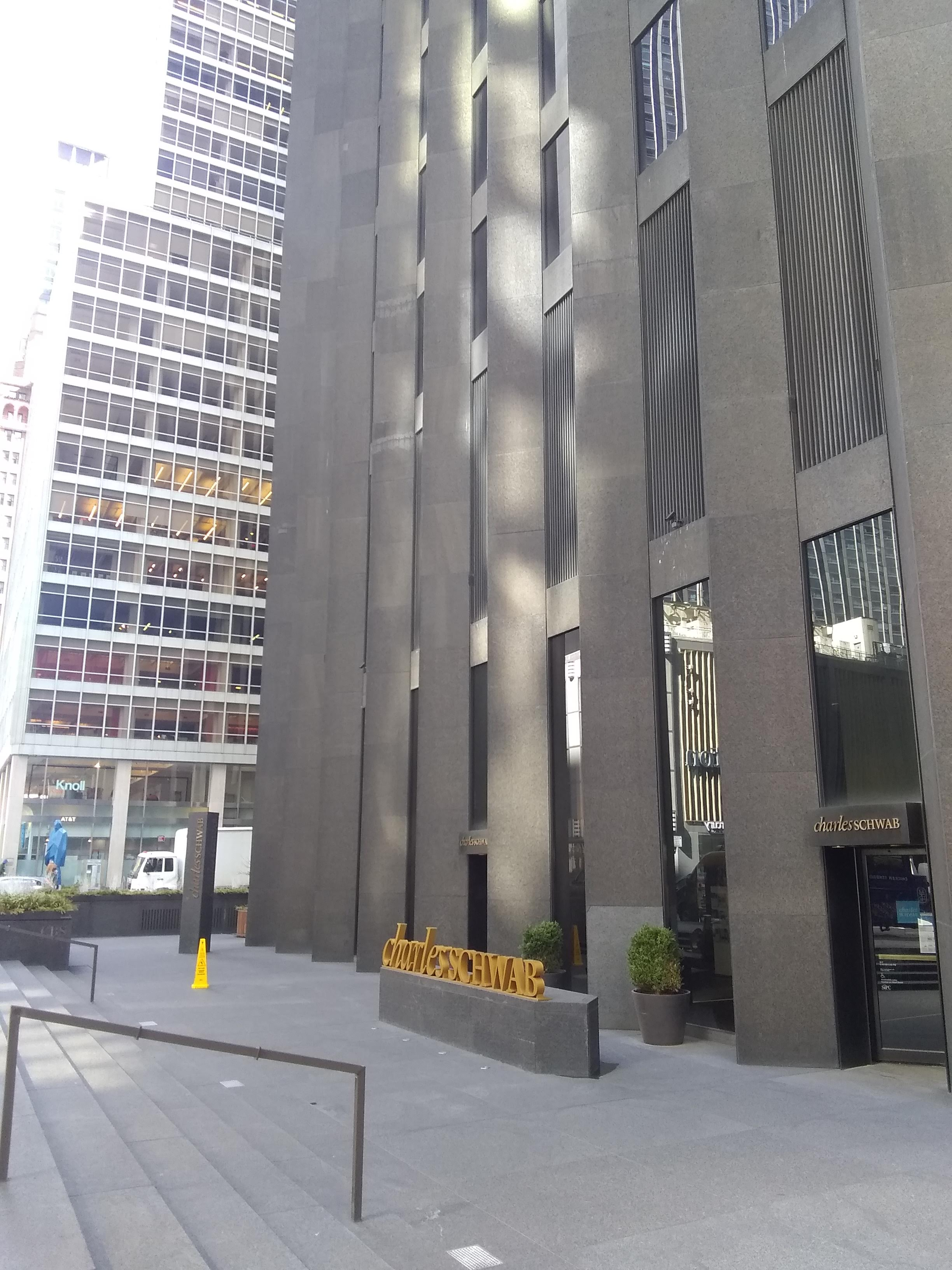
The Sixth Avenue side was originally designed without entrances.

The sides of the piers extend outward 45 degrees from the building line, thereby creating a 90-degree angle at the tip of a "V". Each of the CBS Building's corners consists of two V-shaped piers, which appear as a massive load-bearing chamfer, though this effect is purely aesthetic. The northwest-corner pier bears no load; a section of that pier was designed to be removable so large mechanical equipment could be lifted into and out of the building. Unlike other contemporary skyscrapers with load-bearing walls, in which walls on the lower stories are thicker than those on the upper stories, the piers in the CBS Building are of a uniform width. During the construction process, CBS executives and Saarinen's team considered using synthetic granite for the facade, but CBS chairman William S. Paley ultimately decided to use genuine granite, since it was more durable.

The piers divide the west and east facades vertically into 12 bays, while the north and south facades are divided into 15 bays. The glass panes contain bronze-finished aluminum frames that are about 18 feet (5.5 m) tall on the ground story and 9 feet (2.7 m) tall on upper stories. The panes are separated vertically by 6-inch-tall (150 mm) windowsills between each story. The windows are recessed 2 inches (51 mm) from the piers on the exterior and 18 inches (460 mm) on the interior. For insulation, 300,000 square feet (28,000 m^{2}) of polyurethane foam was sprayed in the piers. According to the insulation contractor, the CBS Building was the first New York City high-rise to use polyurethane as insulation.

To make the building appear imposing, Saarinen did not include a main entrance from Sixth Avenue in his design, because he did not want to modify the piers on that side. He also refused to use entasis—applying a convex curve for aesthetic purposes. The main entrances were instead placed on the 52nd Street and 53rd Street sides, though small doors were later installed on Sixth Avenue. On 52nd Street, the entrances are in the seven center bays and consist of single, double, and revolving doors; the easternmost set of doors leads to the ground-level restaurant. There are also seven entrances on 53rd Street, but the entrance to the restaurant on that side is separated from the other entrance doorways by a window. On the east facade are doorways that lead directly into the restaurant space. On the second story, a mechanical floor, there are metal grilles instead of glass panes. Similar grates are placed at the top story, also a mechanical floor.

=== Structural features ===
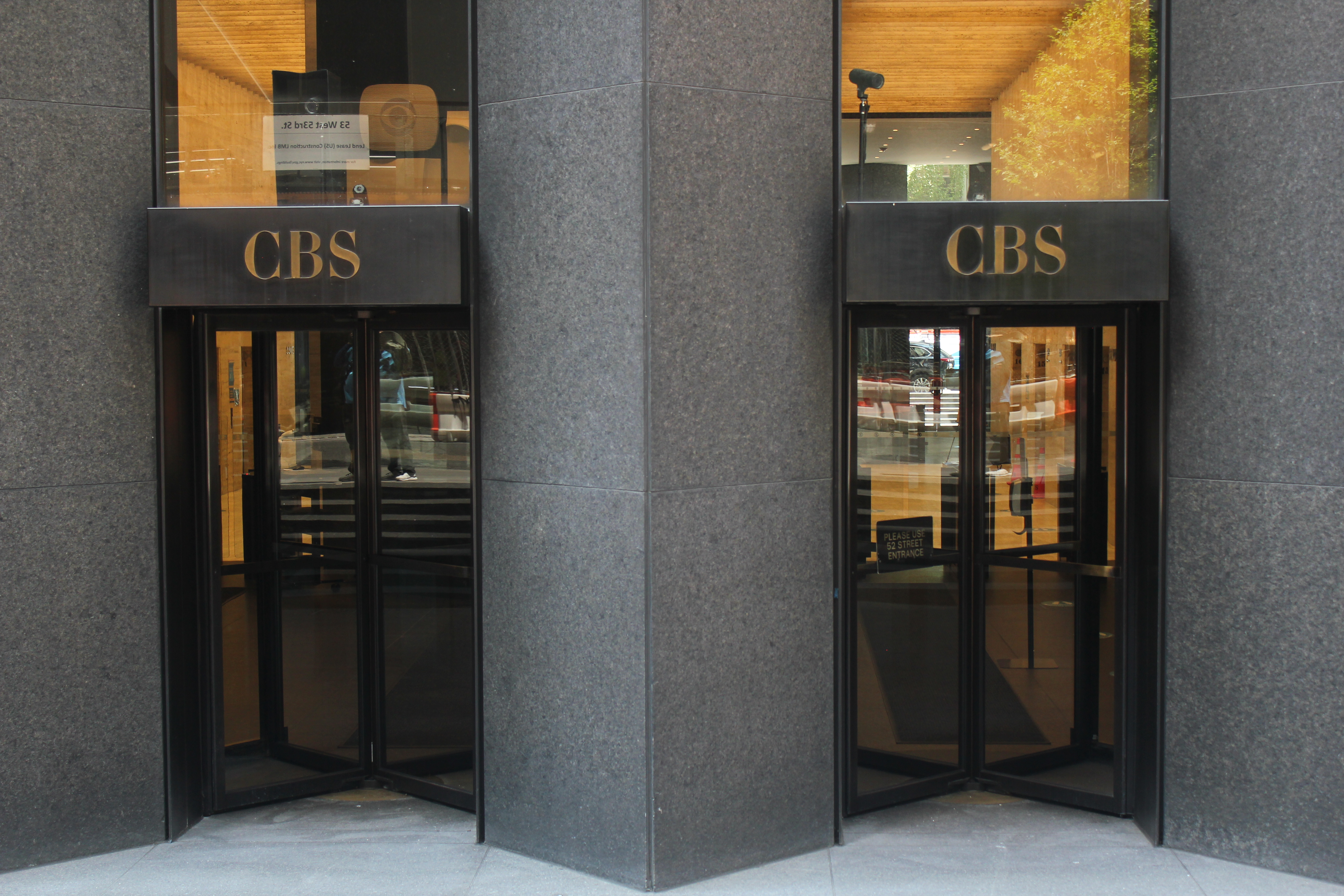
The CBS Building's exterior piers double as load-bearing walls.

The CBS Building has a superstructure made of reinforced concrete; it was the city's first skyscraper with a concrete superstructure to be built after World War II. Paul Weidlinger of Saarinen's engineering team said: "Too many people were saying 'it cannot be done' and we were itching to show them." Saarinen's team had considered making a superstructure of steel, as well as a superstructure with a mixture of steel and concrete, before deciding on an all-concrete structure after evaluating the cost of each option. During the planning process, the price of steel surpassed the price of concrete, influencing the team's decision. The concrete used in the CBS Building's floor slabs was 25 percent lighter than that used in conventional concrete slabs.

Because the exterior piers are spaced so closely together, they double as load-bearing walls. This contrasted with other contemporary skyscrapers, where internal columns typically carried the structural loads. Within each pier, insulation is placed between the granite cladding and the reinforced concrete, allowing the concrete piers to retain the same temperature as the building's mechanical core. The piers contain electrical wiring, air-conditioning ducts, and heating ducts. Only the intake pipes and ducts are within the piers; the return pipes and ducts are within the core. In addition, each pier supports floor beams, which connect to a structural core at the center of the building. On the inner face of each pier is an L-shaped beam, which carries the floor plates. To avoid impacting the subway tunnel directly underneath the building, some of the piers are placed on large steel girders over the tunnel. The steel girders above the subway were the only major pieces of steel used during construction.

The CBS Building's mechanical core includes the elevators and stairs and measures 55 by 85 feet (17 by 26 m). It was designed to withstand the wind shear hitting the building. The core carries most of the building's structural loads, but some of the loads are transferred through the concrete floor slabs to the piers on the facade. There are 17-inch-deep (430 mm) ribs on the central floor slabs, and the walls of the mechanical core are between 12 and 28 inches (300 and 710 mm) thick. The office space on each story has a maximum depth of 35 feet (11 m) between the curtain wall and the core. The offices do not contain columns; the core is the only obstruction on each floor. By relocating all mechanical spaces, elevators, and stairs to the core, Saarinen wanted to maximize the efficiency of the floor layout.

=== Interior ===
According to Architectural Record, the CBS Building has a gross floor area of about 800,000 square feet (74,000 m^{2}), while according to the New York City Department of City Planning, the building spans 817,095 square feet (75,911 m^{2}). Sixteen elevators are placed within the mechanical core; as of 2023, the elevators use a destination dispatch system. On each story, a passageway runs through the core, providing access to both the elevator lobbies and service rooms there.

==== Ground floor and basement ====
The design of the CBS Building's ground story matched the building's exterior appearance. The ground story was originally divided into a banking space to the west, a restaurant to the east, and the main lobby in the center. The lobby, the only interior space designed by Saarinen's firm, was split into two sections that flanked an elevator core. The architects installed vertical bronze batten walls on either side of each entrance. The inner faces of the granite exterior piers are flat and are flush with the batten walls. The floor of the lobby was generally made of granite, except around the elevators, whereas the floor and walls were made of travertine. These surfaces were modified in 1992. The original design of the lobby was largely restored in the early 2020s, although grid-shaped chandeliers were added. Following the 2020s renovation, the entrance to the lobby on 53rd Street was converted to a tenant-only entrance, while a new reception desk was added at 52nd Street. In addition, the lobby was decorated with materials reminiscent of the original facade's design. These included wooden boards with brass tips; a reception desk with backlit stone; and granite wall slabs. A fresco by Vincent Ashbahian, with decorations inspired by CBS's logo, is placed above the desk.

The western part of the ground floor originally contained a banking space used by the Bank of New York. The firm of Haines, Lundberg Waehler designed the bank, whose space extended into the basement. Escalators, a private elevator, and a stairway connected the ground floor and basement. According to Alan R. Griffith, later a president of the bank, the presence of the branch in the CBS Building gave the bank an advantage over its competitors in lending to communications companies. The basement also contained storage space and a mailroom for CBS, in addition to a food-preparation kitchen.

The eastern part of the ground floor originally had a restaurant called "The Ground Floor", designed by Warren Platner. The restaurant, originally operated by Jerry Brody of Restaurant Associates, was designed to accommodate 220 guests for dinner. The restaurant space had a grill room and an open kitchen at its center. There was also a bar facing 52nd Street and a principal dining room facing 53rd Street. The main lighting system consisted of mahogany-and-glass fixtures with filament bulbs. Dorfman designed a 35-foot-wide (11 m) by 8.5-foot-tall (2.6 m) artwork, Gastrotypographicalassemblage, for the restaurant; it listed all of the restaurant's dishes in hand-milled wood type. The artwork, removed in the 1990s, was reinstalled in the Culinary Institute of America at Hyde Park in the 2010s. As of 2018, the space contains the Nusr-Et steakhouse, operated by Turkish chef Salt Bae.

An amenity area including a concierge lobby, tenant lounge, and a 119-seat "forum" was constructed within the building in 2023. Known as Club 53, the space occupies the northern half of the lobby, along 53rd Street, and is for tenants and their visitors. A staircase, hanging above a shallow pool, descends to the basement; the staircase has glass railings and undulating stainless-steel cladding. The spaces on the lower level include the forum, a lounge, a food bar, and a fitness room. Club 53 is largely decorated with furnishings from Florence Knoll Bassett, in reference to her role in designing the original interiors.

==== Other stories ====
The 5-foot-wide bays of the facade influenced the CBS Building's interior arrangement since, at the time, office space could easily be arranged into modules measuring 5 by 5 feet. This allowed for high flexibility in planning interior offices, and the exterior piers were so wide that the smallest offices along the building's perimeter could border a windowless wall. As originally arranged, CBS's private offices measured at least 10 by 10 feet (3.0 by 3.0 m). There was a high amount of standardization on floors with executive offices. Presidents had offices measuring 20 by 20 ft (6.1 by 6.1 m), vice presidents 15 by 15 ft (4.6 by 4.6 m), directors 15 by 10 ft (4.6 by 3.0 m), and managers 10 by 10 ft (3.0 by 3.0 m). Conference rooms could be placed around the mechanical core, as they did not require much natural light. Even so, the lack of interior columns allowed the clerical offices and interior spaces to receive sufficient sunlight. The ceilings contain recessed fluorescent lights, along with air-conditioning ducts.

At the building's opening, Architectural Forum wrote of the office designs: "Rich materials have been used throughout and no detail has been left unstudied." Movable partitions could be set up on each story; the partitions themselves had magnetic hangers because nails could not be driven into them. In designing the offices, the interior designers used varying color schemes to create what Architectural Forum characterized as a "bright and cheerful atmosphere". Knoll's team designed the reception area on every floor with different color schemes, furniture, and works of art. CBS executives used large dining tables to hold small meetings and do paperwork, and they also had smaller furniture with items such as TVs, radios, and personal documents. Individual offices were furnished with vases and paintings, and furniture and decorations were made as inconspicuous as possible. CBS employees were not allowed to display personal decorations or even family photographs. The employee cafeteria had a food-themed mural by Lou Dorfsman, walnut chairs, and plastic-topped tables. Other rooms had work by artists such as Mario Molli, Jean Dubuffet, and Francis Celentano, and furniture by Don Pettit and Ludwig Mies van der Rohe was used in some offices.

Mechanical stories are placed directly above the lobby as well as at the top floor. The second story controls the plumbing, heating, and ventilation systems, while the top story contains a cooling tower. In typical New York City office buildings, some mechanical equipment is placed in the basement, but this was not feasible for the CBS Building, since vibrations from passing subway trains could affect the equipment. There is also a roof garden, which was renovated in the 2020s.

== History ==
William S. Paley became chairman of the Columbia Broadcasting System (CBS) in 1928 and, after expanding the number of CBS's broadcasting affiliates, relocated the company's offices the following year to 485 Madison Avenue. Architect William Lescaze designed a headquarters for CBS in 1935, which was not built. By the late 1950s, CBS was again searching for a site for a new headquarters. At the time, the company occupied several sites across Manhattan in addition to 485 Madison Avenue. Paley said: "I think we were [...] determined that if we went ahead on our own building for CBS, it would have to be of the highest aesthetic quality obtainable."

CBS initially considered sites along Fifth Avenue, on the East River shorefront, and in the New Jersey Meadowlands. CBS also considered acquiring one of two plots on Park Avenue, which later became the sites of the Pan Am Building and 277 Park Avenue. Paley dismissed the Park Avenue sites as having "too cold a feeling"; he also believed that Madison Avenue, a block west, was "too narrow to display good architecture". By contrast, speculative office towers were being developed along Sixth Avenue, three blocks west of Park Avenue, in the mid-20th century. Many of these structures were designed as metal-and-glass slabs with public plazas. Paley believed Sixth Avenue to be "more stimulating" than Park Avenue.

=== Development ===
==== Planning ====
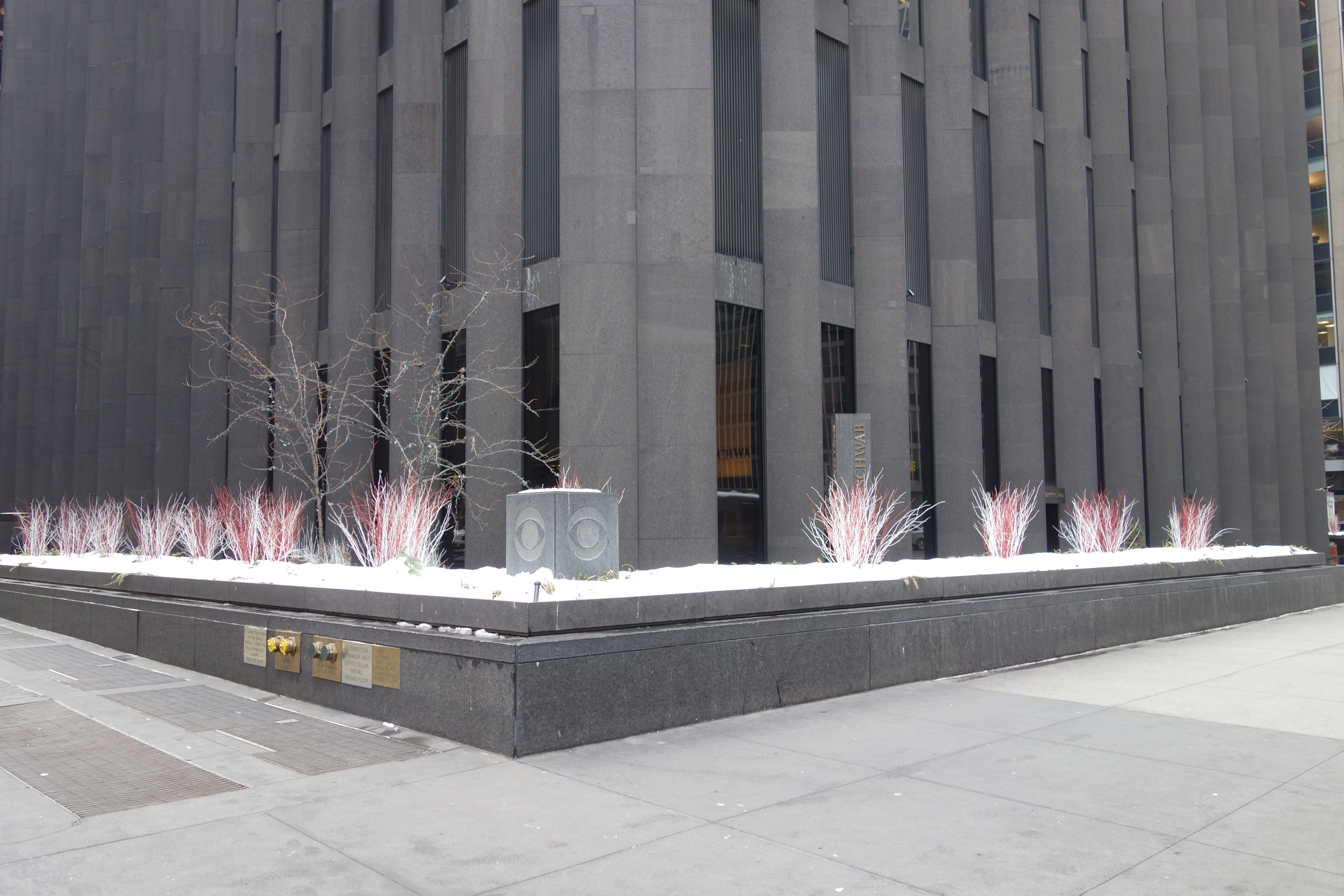
The CBS Building, seen from the corner of Sixth Avenue and 53rd Street

In July 1960, CBS announced that it had acquired a 40,000 square feet (3,700 m^{2}) site on Sixth Avenue, between 52nd and 53rd streets, from William Zeckendorf's company Webb and Knapp. The site cost $7 million, of which Zeckendorf received $5 million. The building would not include broadcast studios, which instead were to be consolidated at the CBS Broadcast Center, simultaneously being planned on 57th Street. CBS acquired an adjacent land lot on 53 West 52nd Street in July 1961, bringing its plot there to its final size of nearly 48,000 square feet (4,500 m^{2}). CBS president Stanton wanted to hire Eero Saarinen & Associates for the project, having been impressed with the firm's design for the General Motors Technical Center in Michigan. Paley was initially skeptical, as he was acquainted with modernist architects Wallace Harrison and Philip Johnson, but he relented.

Ultimately, CBS hired Saarinen to design a new corporate headquarters for CBS on the plot. The CBS corporate building was to be Saarinen's first skyscraper and, as it turned out, the only skyscraper he would ever design. Paley and Saarinen both wanted to erect a skyscraper that was distinct from International Style works such as Skidmore, Owings & Merrill's Lever House and Ludwig Mies van der Rohe's Seagram Building. Saarinen's biographer Jayne Merkel wrote that the architect particularly wanted to make "the best modern skyscraper anywhere", surpassing even the Seagram. As Saarinen's wife Aline B. Saarinen said after his death, "After all, that's why they came to Eero and not to Skidmore." The architect contemplated several alternatives involving rectangular slabs, as well as more standard towers with setbacks that complied with the 1916 Zoning Resolution. Saarinen's firm created five sets of blueprints, four of which had a square plan.

During the building's development, city officials had implemented the 1961 Zoning Resolution, a modification of the 1916 regulations. Saarinen, who had worked with city planning commissioner James Felt to resolve the project's zoning issues, wanted to add a sunken plaza with trees outside the CBS Building. The land lot had a floor area ratio of 15, meaning that the building's gross floor area was restricted to 15 times the area of the site. Saarinen developed several alternatives, including a 15-story building filing the site, but he ultimately decided on a 38-story building occupying a portion of the site. In March 1961, Saarinen wrote to Paley that he had developed a solution: a freestanding slab bereft of setbacks, with a facade composed of triangular piers interspersed with windows. The slab would have been either 424 or 491 feet (129 or 150 m) tall. (Note: Paley 1979, p. 343 gave a height of 424 feet, while a 1962 book of Saarinen's work gave a height of 491 feet.) Saarinen wrote of the design: "It will be the simplest skyscraper statement in New York." Paley twice visited Saarinen's offices in Detroit to see a model of the building. On his first visit Paley was unimpressed; after his second visit in July 1961, Paley decided to commit to Saarinen's proposal.

Following Saarinen's sudden death on September 1, 1961, his associates, including Kevin Roche, Joseph N. Lacy, and John Dinkeloo, formed Roche-Dinkeloo and took over the CBS Building's design. The CBS headquarters was one of several commissions that Roche-Dinkeloo had received from Saarinen's former clients following his death. Dinkeloo said the CBS headquarters had "especially excited" Saarinen, who had said: "I think Louis Sullivan was right to want the skyscraper to be a soaring thing." In the firm's office at New Rochelle, New York, Roche and his associates created several mockups of the building. Paley recalled that he visited the Roche-Dinkeloo offices at least thirty times to observe five or six mockups.

==== Construction and opening ====
In February 1962, CBS announced that it would continue developing its 38-story building. The George A. Fuller Company was selected as the general contractor. The headquarters was to house CBS's International, News, Radio, Television Network, Television Stations, and Columbia Records divisions. The contractors chose to decorate the building with granite from Alma, Quebec, after examining samples of granite from numerous countries around the world. In July 1962, a construction fence was erected around the work site. The fence along Sixth Avenue was made of plexiglass, allowing passersby to observe the construction; a CBS spokesperson likened it to 980 "portholes" in a standard plywood fence. The building's first tenant, a branch of the Bank of New York, signed a 21-year lease that August for a portion of the lobby and basement along Sixth Avenue.

By early 1964, the superstructure was halfway complete. The concrete piers were poured around steel molds measuring one story high. After the concrete for the first story had hardened, the mold was moved to the second story, where the process was repeated until construction reached the roof. Two cranes were also installed to lift equipment into place. A section of one pier on the second floor remained wide-open during construction so materials could be lifted into the building. To give the facade piers a rough surface, the top layer of granite cladding was burned at 5,000 °F (2,760 °C) using a process called thermal stippling. The stippling process gave the black granite a grayish hue; to restore the black color, an abrasive was applied to the granite under extremely high water pressure, a process called liquid honing.

The first CBS employees relocated into the building from the old Madison Avenue headquarters in late 1964. At the time, much of the interior was still being completed. By September 1965, most of the CBS Building's initial 2,500 employees had moved into the building. The interior work was mostly complete, except for the offices of Paley and Stanton, who had decided that their offices be decorated last. Upon its completion in 1965, the CBS headquarters was nicknamed CBS/51W52. The estimated final cost of $40 million was not publicly confirmed. The Ground Floor restaurant opened in November 1965.

=== 20th-century use ===
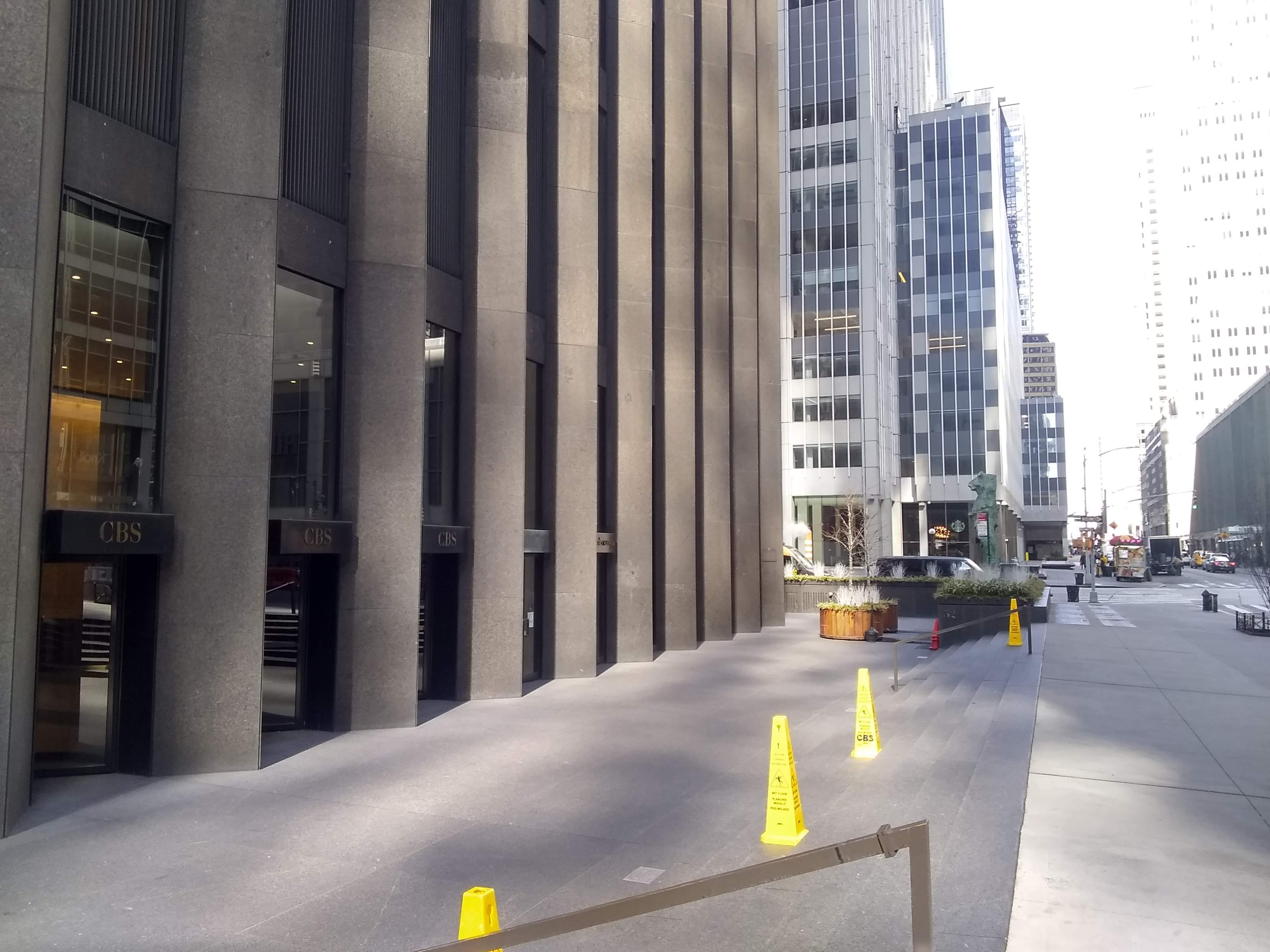
Recessed plaza surrounding the building

For the first quarter-century of the CBS Building's existence, all of the office space was occupied by CBS. The company commissioned Vincent Ashbahian to design artwork for the building's lobby in 1976. The artwork, representing CBS and its subsidiaries, was briefly displayed in the building during the late 1970s; Ashbahian owned the artwork until his death three decades later. CBS had 9,900 employees in New York by 1981, many of whom worked at the CBS Building.

The Ground Floor restaurant was overhauled in 1980, becoming the American Charcuterie. Judith Stockman oversaw the renovation, which largely preserved the restaurant's original layout. The restaurant space became the Rose Restaurant in 1983 after Paley asked the restaurant's operators to come to the CBS Building. The restaurant was renovated again in 1987, and the space became the China Grill. Throughout the 1980s, CBS downsized its presence in the building. Sony Corporation of America acquired CBS Records International in 1988, and the CBS Records company became known as Sony Music Entertainment two years later. Sony Music Entertainment briefly continued to lease space from CBS, though Sony Music's employees moved to 550 Madison Avenue in 1991 after Sony leased that building.

By the early 1990s, CBS had downsized to about 4,700 employees and had begun leasing out vacant space. The law firm Wachtell, Lipton, Rosen & Katz signed a lease for floors 27 to 33, and the real estate brokerage firm Edward S. Gordon advertised floors 4 to 14 for outside tenants. By 1993, the real estate firm Cushman & Wakefield had taken another six stories. To accommodate the new lessees, CBS renovated the building's lobby and mechanical systems for $20 million. Paul Goldberger wrote that the work "represents nothing less than an attempt to convert one of the great modern buildings in New York into an ordinary speculative office tower". CBS placed its building for sale in late 1998, with the intention of making at least $350 million. Several investors expressed interest in buying the structure, but the company canceled its plans to sell the building in mid-1999 because all of the offers were too low.

=== 21st-century use ===
==== CBS ownership and sale attempts ====
After Viacom acquired CBS in 2000, and in the wake of an improving real-estate market, Viacom planned to sell the building for up to $370 million but planned to allow CBS's existing employees in the building to remain. In October 2000, radio stations WCBS (AM) and WCBS-FM moved from the CBS Building to the Broadcast Center, as the former could not accommodate the modern broadcasting technology that these stations required. By early 2001, Viacom had planned to buy 1515 Broadway (also known as One Astor Plaza), its own headquarters, in conjunction with its sale of the CBS Building. Two firms had expressed interest in purchasing the building by August, but one of them withdrew shortly after the September 11 attacks. The sale was canceled in November 2001. This was attributed in part to Viacom's demand that any buyer first acquire 1515 Broadway and then swap that for the CBS Building and cash; such a transaction would have allowed Viacom to avoid paying estate transfer taxes. In 2005, CBS and Viacom were split into two companies.

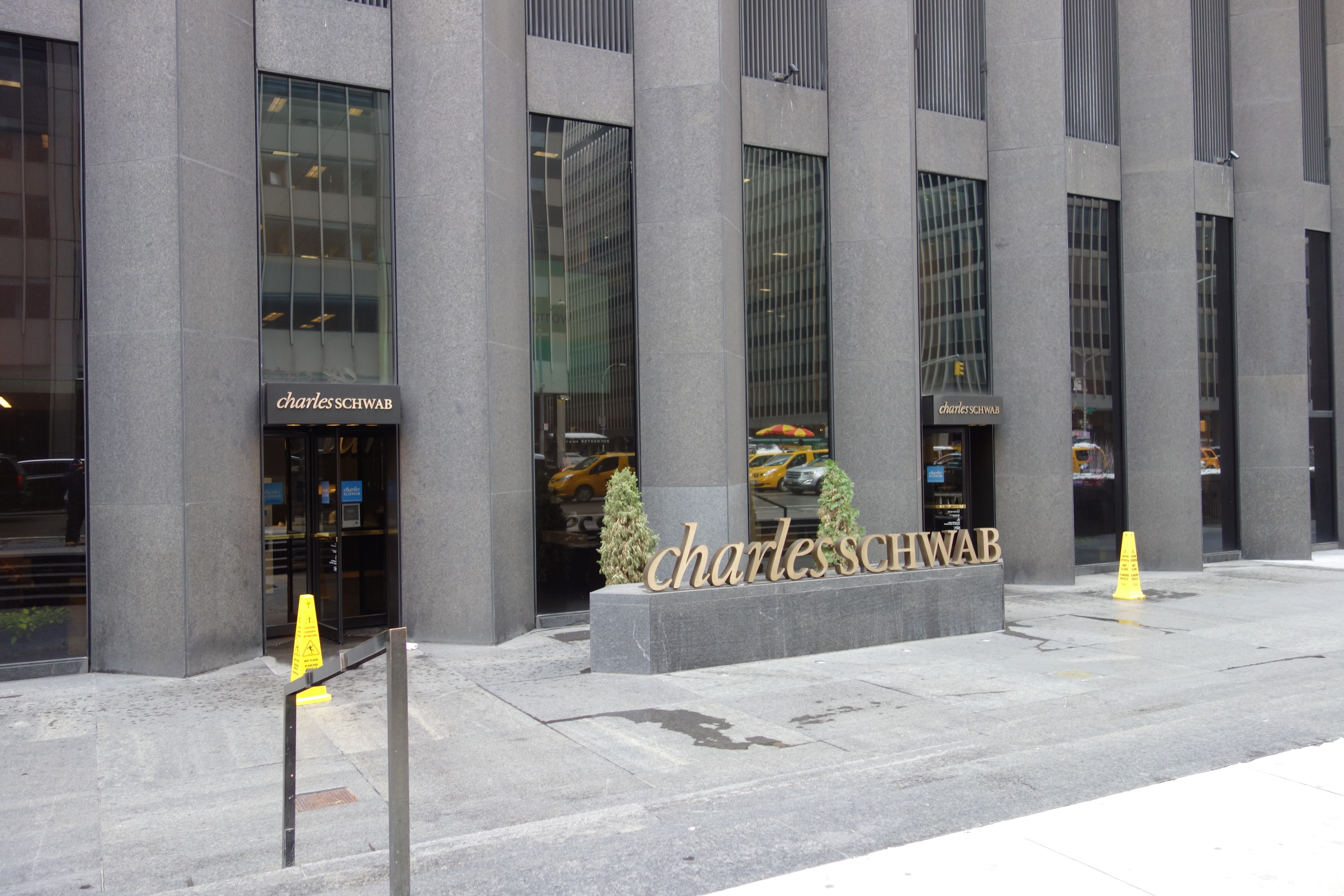
Charles Schwab sign on the Sixth Avenue side

The law firm Orrick, Herrington & Sutcliffe leased 220,000 square feet (20,000 m^{2}) in the building in 2009, taking up some space that had been occupied by Swiss bank UBS. The following year, investment company Charles Schwab leased 8,000 square feet (740 m^{2}) in the building. Schwab proposed installing planters with signage in front of the building, though the local Manhattan Community Board 5 initially refused to approve the plans unless Schwab downsized and relocated the signage. After Ashbahian died in 2013, he donated his CBS artwork back to the company, and the artwork was displayed in the CBS Building's lobby.

In February 2017, the China Grill restaurant closed; it was replaced the following January by the Nusr-Et steakhouse. Also in 2018, Wachtell, Lipton, Rosen & Katz renewed its lease in the building. Charles Schwab, Orrick, Herrington & Sutcliffe, and law firm Dorsey & Whitney retained space at the CBS Building during this time. Shortly after Viacom and CBS merged again into ViacomCBS in December 2019, the newly combined company's CEO Bob Bakish said the company was looking to sell the building. The company sought more than $1 billion for the CBS Building, but CBS canceled the sale in March 2020 with the onset of the COVID-19 pandemic in New York City.

==== Harbor Group International ownership ====
In August 2021, ViacomCBS announced that they had agreed to sell the building to the real estate investment and management firm Harbor Group International for $760 million, the first actual sale of the building since it opened. ViacomCBS planned to occupy some space under a short-term lease. Harbor Group intended to upgrade the building's lobby, as well as tenant facilities such as the cafeteria. The sale was finalized in late 2021 after HGI received $558 million in commercial mortgage-backed securities to finance its purchase. At the time, 96.4 percent of the building's space was occupied, with seven tenants (including Nusr-Et and a newsstand) with a combined annual rent of about $33.8 million.

After taking over the building, HGI rebranded the structure as 51W52. The group spent $36 million renovating the lobby and amenity areas in 2023, hiring Vocon and Moed de Armas and Shannon to design the renovation. CBS moved employees out during late 2023 and announced plans to vacate the building entirely by November 2024. CBS's relocation, along with the upcoming expiration of two other tenants' leases, prompted lenders to express concern over whether HGI would be able to refinance a $420 million mortgage on the building. Harbor Group International finished renovating the CBS Building in April 2024; the project had cost $128 million. By then, almost 90 percent of the building's space was leased. Law firm Alston & Bird leased 170,000 square feet (16,000 m^{2}) at 51W52 in June 2026.

== Impact ==
=== Reception ===
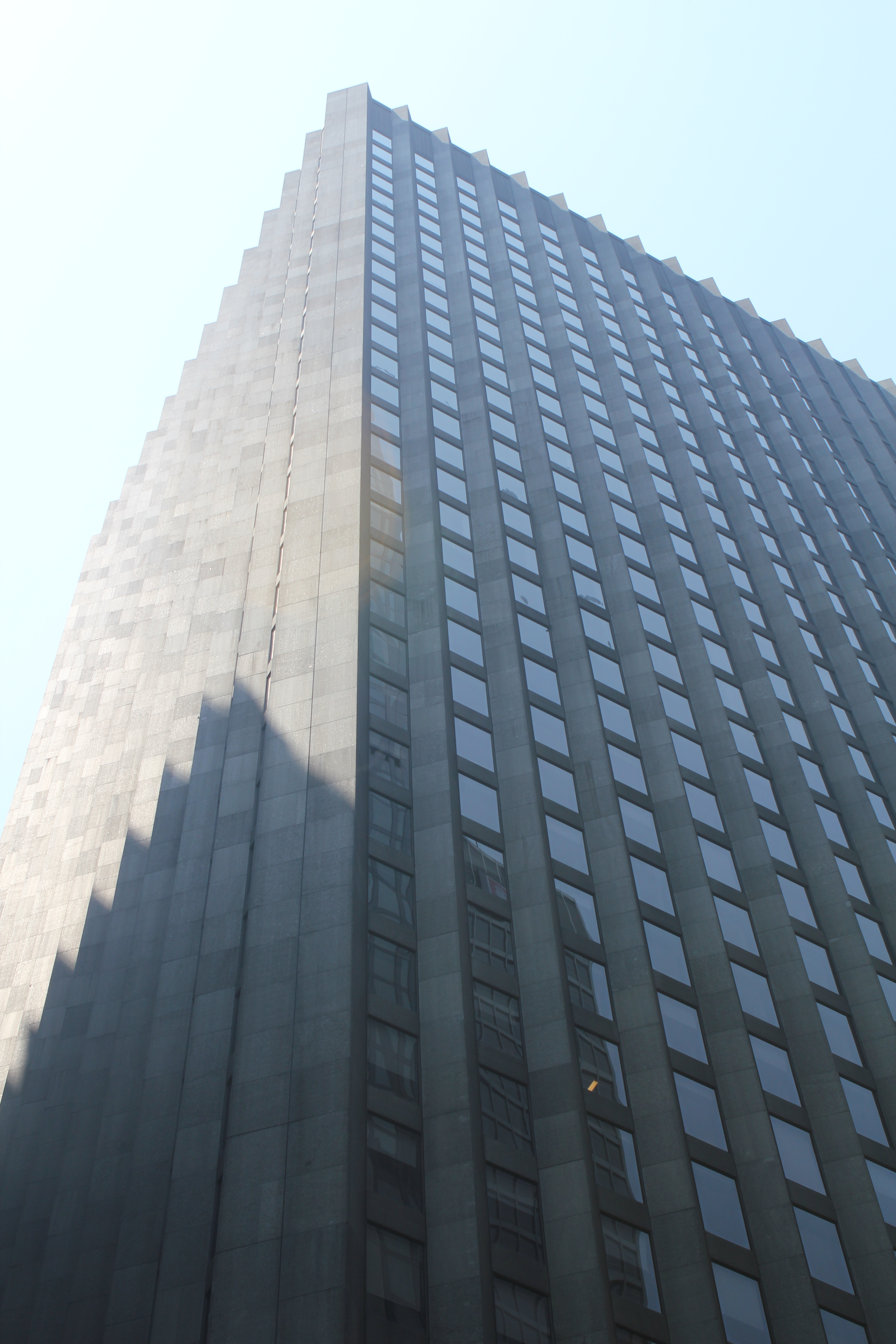
Facade of the upper stories

Upon its completion, the CBS Building received much praise, albeit with qualifications. Huxtable called the CBS headquarters "a building, in the true, classic sense". Bethami Probst wrote in Progressive Architecture magazine that the CBS Building was a "dignified, pertinent rebuke to its more strident high-rise neighbors", though she did not consider it as good as the Seagram Building. A writer for Architectural Forum summarized the CBS Building thus: "It has enormous unity; it has strength; the proportions of its windows are elegant; it has great dignity; and it even has color." Peter Blake, writing for the same magazine, said the CBS Building "stands aloof, alone, serene", but this was a positive trait compared to the other structures being built on the avenue at the same time, which he summarized as the "slaughter on Sixth Avenue". David Jacobs regarded the building as "a marvelous contribution" to New York City despite its "impersonal and forbidding" profile, while the architectural writer G. E. Kidder Smith said that "understatement has rarely been so totally stated". Jayson Blair of The New York Times wrote in 2000: "Noted for its minimalist design and its somber, dark granite skin, Black Rock stands in stark contrast to the steel-and-glass towers nearby on the Avenue of the Americas."

The design deviated from the architectural norms of the time, leading to some criticism. One common objection was that the consistent width of the facade's piers did not accurately express their function, since the piers carry reduced loads at upper stories and thus should be smaller. Several critics disapproved of the piers at each corner for a similar reason, but a 1965 Architectural Forum article had praised this same quality, describing the piers as being "directly expressed from plaza to sky" instead of being recessed behind curtain walls. Harper's Magazine also commended "the honesty with which it occupies its context". Huxtable observed that the public had a much different perception of the building than architectural critics, saying: "The dark dignity that appeals to architectural sophisticates puts off the public, which tends to reject it as funereal." She wrote in 1984 that the CBS Building's design "created deliberate, dark ambiguities at a time when architecture was supposed to be rational and open". The author Antonio Román stated in 2003 that the building's "internal and external consistency perfectly conveyed Saarinen's vision for the tower".

The interiors were more broadly criticized. Huxtable described the offices as having a "curious deadness" because the style of the exterior was not extended into the interior spaces. Patricia Conway of Industrial Design magazine saw the tightly regulated decorative scheme as contrived, saying: "A few pieces [of decoration] have charm but, for the most part, there is a preponderance of hard-edge, straight-line compositions". Other publications praised the interior decorative scheme, to the point that The New Yorker profiled Stanton's desk. Stern characterized the lobby, which did have the same style as the exterior, as "austere to the point of lugubriousness". Likewise, Probst wrote that the thick facade piers overshadowed the lobby. The Ground Floor restaurant was also perceived as a gloomy environment, especially at night. A writer for Progressive Architecture doubted whether the CBS Building's ground story "can ever be a suitable, psychologically acceptable atmosphere for pleasant dining".

=== Awards and architectural influence ===
The CBS Building has won several architectural awards. In 1964, the Architectural League of New York gave Frank Stanton its Michael Friedman Medal for his "significant contributions and effective encouragement of the role of the arts in business and industry", in conjunction with the construction of eight CBS facilities nationwide, including the CBS Building. The Municipal Art Society gave the building a bronze plaque in 1965, recognizing its "outstanding architecture", and the New York Board of Trade gave one of its first-ever architectural achievement awards to the CBS Building the same year. Saarinen's firm received an honor award from the American Institute of Architects in 1966 for the CBS Building's design.

The New York City Landmarks Preservation Commission granted city-landmark status to the CBS Building on October 21, 1997, as landmark number 1971. LPC chairwoman Jennifer J. Raab said the designation was part of "our ongoing effort to designate worthy modern buildings as they become eligible" for city-landmark status; the CBS Building had just become eligible for such a designation, as city landmarks had to be at least 30 years old.

== See also ==
- List of New York City Designated Landmarks in Manhattan from 14th to 59th Streets
- List of works by Eero Saarinen
