= Gastrotypographicalassemblage =

1966 artwork by Lou Dorfsman

- Artist: Lou Dorfsman
- Year: 1966
- Type: Wood typography
- Dimensions: 11 m × 2.6 m (35 ft × 8.5 ft)
- Location: CBS Building, New York City

Gastrotypographicalassemblage (compound word: Gastro | typographical | assemblage) is a 35-by-8.5-foot (10.7 m × 2.6 m) work of art designed by Lou Dorfsman to decorate the cafeteria in Eero Saarinen's CBS Building on 52nd Street and Sixth Avenue, New York City, New York.

As the senior vice president and creative director for marketing communications and design for CBS, Dorfsman was responsible for all aspects of the building's graphics, designating the type, design, and spacing for wall clocks, elevator buttons, and elevator inspection stickers. He designed what he called Gastrotypographicalassemblage for the building's cafeteria, using varied typefaces to list all of the foods offered to patrons in hand-milled wood type. The completed work was based on ideas conceived in the mid-1960s. The project was ultimately completed in 1966 with assistance from graphic designer Herb Lubalin, and Tom Carnase, who crafted the typography from Dorfsman's original design. Dorfsman considered this work to be "his magnum opus, his gift to the world".

Gastrotypographicalassemblage was discarded in the early 1990s by CBS, but the work's nine panels were retrieved by designer Nick Fasciano. It was in an advanced state of disrepair, aggravated by improper storage. The piece was acquired by the Atlanta-based Center for Design Study in the mid-2000s, which developed a program to raise the funds needed to support the restoration of the work of art. Funding goals to begin the restoration fell short, and efforts to restore the work did not begin at that time.

Following the death of Lou Dorfsman in 2008, it was announced that the Culinary Institute of America in Hyde Park, New York, would serve as the new home for Gastrotypographicalassemblage. The college worked with Nick Fasciano to fund the restoration, and the work was put on public display for the first time starting in March 2014, when it was showcased in the Institute's new Marriott Pavilion and Conference Center in its Hyde Park campus, where it remains to this day.
