= Costas Picadas =

Visual artist

Costas Picadas (born October 11, 1966 in Ioannina, Greece) is a Greek born American multi-media visual artist whose works examines cellular structure and immunology.

== Biography ==
His father was a Greek doctor. Picadas studied at the Ecole Des Beaux-Arts and Louvre School in Paris.

in 2023 his work was the subject of a solo exhibition at the Terri Gallery in Manhattan and ran from May 5 to May 31 of that year. Again in 2023 Picadas's work was the subject of a solo exhibition "Universe / Metaverse" at the Donopoulos Gallery in Midtown Manhattan and was on display from November 15 of that year until January 3rd of 2024. Writing in review on this exhibit he late art critic Robert C. Morgan remarked in Whitehot Magazine of Picadas's work therein ...'Here the artist is particularly involved with showing cellular life both in microcosmic detail and macrocosmic form." Indeed because of his familial medical background it has had a strong influence upon his oeuvre, which the critic Jonathan Goodman tipped his hat to in writing in dART International Magazine [that} .."Yet there are differences, too. Remembering the medical background of Costas’s family, we can imagine his imagery as coming from pictures taken with a microscope’s magnification".

In 2024 Picadas was in a two man exhibit with sculptor Aris Katsilakis, "Anatomy Unveiled" at the Santorini Museum of Contemporary Art. n 2025 Picadas enjoyed his first major "thematic solo exhibition in Greece, at the Henry Dunant Hospital Center. Tilted "Phytobiosomes" it presented a particular collection from his opus that was [created to] "focus on vital organs such as the heart, lungs, and brain, and present the healing methods of nature itself. The artist’s realism and poetic sensibility highlight a new perspective on anatomy and the pathways of healing

A phrase the artist often attaches to his work is "Biomes". As PIcadas himself remarked in an interview with Sedition Art ...."I overlay natural imagery I take from forests with the cell imagery from those labs as a way of drawing the comparisons between those life forms. Every individual fauna and flora that exists within a forest exists as a part of a larger system, just like each individual cell in our body does'...

Among Picadas's more striking works are 3d human anatomy models.
