= Ursa Major (sculpture) =

Sculpture by William Underhill

- Artist: William Underhill
- Year: 1966
- Type: Cor-Ten steel
- Dimensions: 820 cm × 1,620 cm × 550 cm (322 in × 636 in × 216 in)

Ursa Major is a public art work by artist William Underhill formerly located at the Lynden Sculpture Garden near Milwaukee, Wisconsin. The trapezoidal abstract sculpture is made of Cor-Ten steel; it was installed on the lawn.
