= Fernando Gaspar =

Portuguese artist

Fernando Gaspar (born 10 March 1966) is a Portuguese visual artist.

Self-taught, Gaspar started his career with drawings and watercolors.

== Career ==
He first participated in exhibitions and awards in 1986. He regularly exhibits in the major cities of Portugal, exploring and adopting other media, materials, and techniques.

Gaspar's first solo exhibition outside Portugal was in 1995 in Belgium. He gathered national awards, participated in more than 40 group exhibitions in Europe, Asia, and South America, and held over 45 solo exhibitions in Portugal and other European countries. The character of his work became increasingly reflective and contemporary.

== Bibliography / Catalogs ==
- Porto 1990 /1997. Aveiro – Portugal: Fernando Gaspar, 1997.
- Bestiário – Touros. Aveiro – Portugal: Enquadrar, 1999.
- Parcours Imaginaire. Brussels- Belgium: Nato, 2000.
- Sítios da Memória. Braga – Portugal: Galeria dos Coimbras, 2000.
- Lugares de uma Viagem. Lisbon – Portugal: Galeria de Arte do Casino Estoril, 2001.
- No Limite da Água. Setubal – Portugal: Arte e Oficina, 2001.
- Personagens para uma História. Lisbon- Portugal: Artemporio, 2002.
- Bestiário – Insectos. Aveiro – Portugal: Enquadrar, 2002.
- Rebelião no Zoo parte I. Lisbon – Portugal: Galeria de Arte do Casino Estoril, 2003.
- Crónicas de um Encontro. Lisbon- Portugal: Galeria de Arte do Casino Estoril, 2005.
- Atlânticas. Aveiro – Portugal: Espaço de Arte do Vera Cruz, 2005.
- Ibéria. Lisboa – Portugal: Galeria de Arte do Casino Estoril, 2006.
- El Afecto el Tiempo y el Río. Salamanca – Spain: Caja Duero / Fundación Duero, 2007.
- Rebelião no Zoo parte II. Lisbon- Portugal: Galeria de Arte do Casino Estoril, 2010.
- Ad Infinitum. Paris – França : FGAC, 2010.
- Sexto Sentido. Macau – RPC : Galeria 57 – Arte Contemporânea, 2012. ISBN 9789728960063.
- Remind 25. Aveiro – Portugal : Banister, 2012. ISBN 9789899761605.
