= Vocon =

American architecture and interior design firm

Practice information
- Founded: 1987
- Location: Cleveland, Ohio, United States

Website
- www.vocon.com

Vocon is an architecture and interior design firm with offices in Cleveland and New York. Siblings Debbie Donley and Paul Voinovich founded the firm in 1987. Currently, the firm has over 200 employees, including workplace strategists, designers, architects, graphics and branding specialists.

== History ==
Founded in 1987, Vocon is a design firm with offices in Cleveland and New York. It provides architectural services for private and public sector clients, covering architecture, interior design, workplace strategy, and experiential brand design. The firm is licensed in all 50 U.S. states and is ranked 41st globally by Interior Design Magazine.

== Notable works ==
- 51W52
- Cleveland Browns Facility
- Cleveland Institute of Art, residence hall source
- Compass headquarters
- Goodyear Tire & Rubber Company's global headquarters
- Key Tower plaza
- Oatey Co. headquarters
- Saucy Brew Works
- Sterling Jewelers Ghent Road headquarters
- Mercedes-Benz of Burlington
- Zashin & Rich office, Oswald Tower

== See also ==
- Interior design
- Retail design
