= Gavriil Gorelov =

Russian painter (1880–1966)

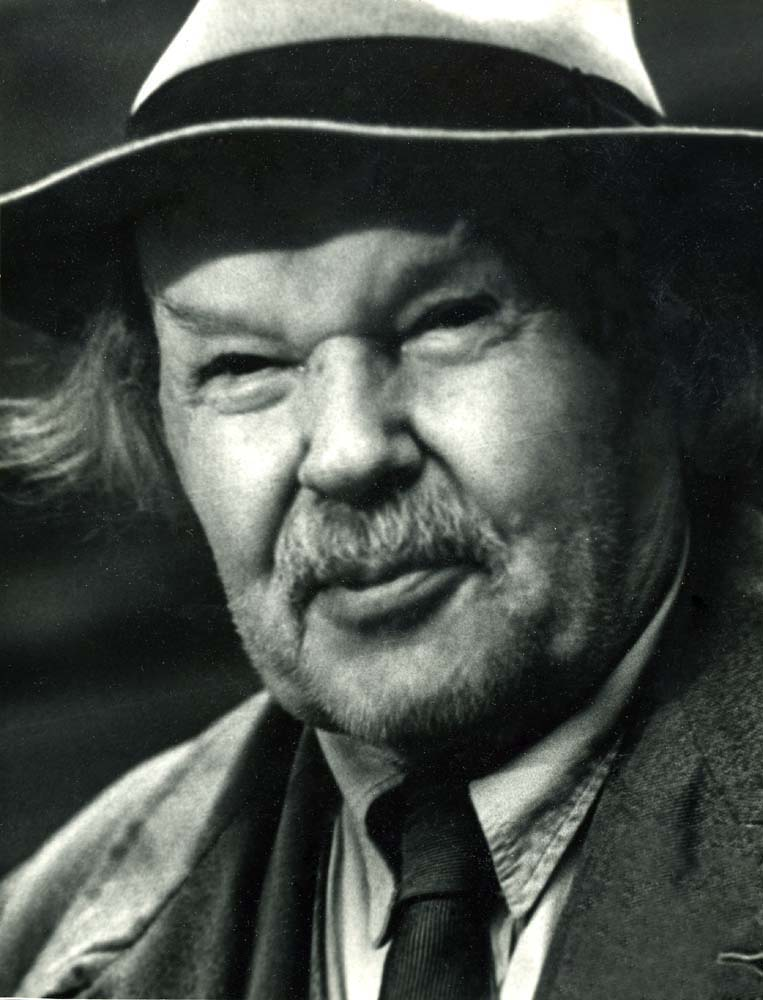
- Gorelov in 1960
- Born: 3 April 1880; Pokrovskoye, Russian Empire
- Died: 16 August 1966 (aged 86); Moscow, Soviet Union
- Known for: Painting
- Movement: Realism

Gavriil Nikitich Gorelov (Russian: Гавриил Никитич Горе́лов; 3 April [O.S. 22 March] 1880, Pokrovskoye – 16 August 1966, Moscow) was a Russian painter.

He was born in Pokrovskoye and studied at the Penza Art College from 1898 to 1903 under the well known Peredvizhniki member Konstantin Savitsky. He subsequently studied at the Imperial Academy of Arts from 1903 to 1911 under the battle-painter Franz Roubaud and the most famous of Russian realists, Ilya Repin. For his diploma work he received the academy's highest honor, the gold medal. The academy also gave him a scholarship which enabled him to study in Germany, Italy, and France from 1911 to 1912. He would later join the AKhRR, which is unsurprising given his contact with the leaders of the Peredvizhniki movement.

== See also ==
- List of Russian artists
- List of 20th-century Russian painters
