= Lou Dorfsman =

American designer (1918–2008)

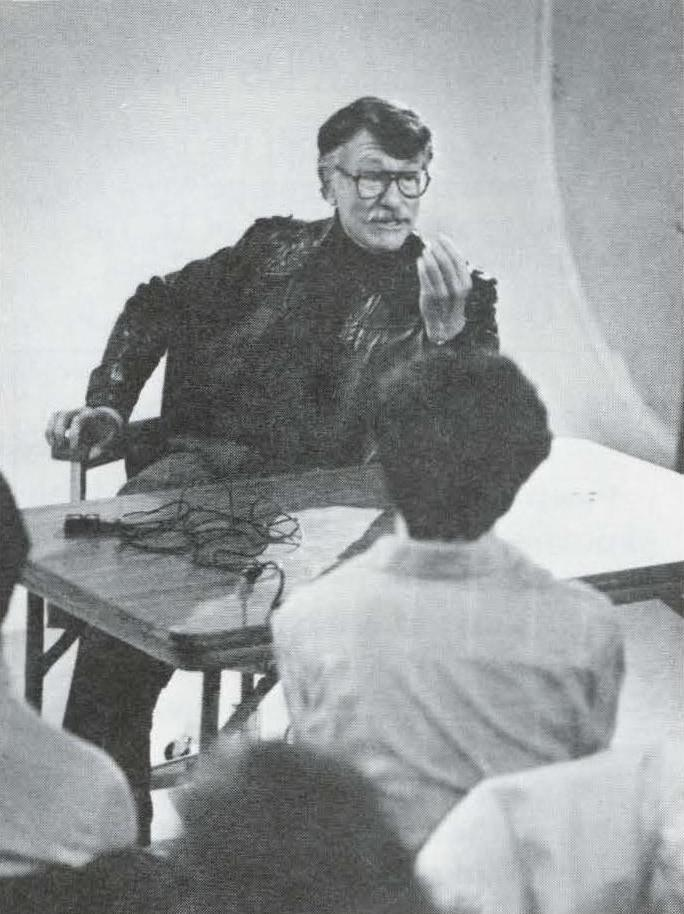
- Dorfsman circa 1983
- Born: April 24, 1918; Manhattan, New York, U.S.
- Died: October 22, 2008 (aged 90); Roslyn, New York, U.S.
- Education: Cooper Union
- Occupation: Graphic designer
- Employer: CBS

Louis Dorfsman (April 24, 1918 – October 22, 2008) was an American graphic designer who oversaw almost every aspect of the advertising and corporate identity for the Columbia Broadcasting System (CBS) in his 40 years with the network between 1946–1987.

== Early life and education ==
Dorfsman was born in 1918 on the Lower East Side of Manhattan, and moved to the Bronx as a child. His parents were Jewish immigrants from Poland. Dorfsman attended Theodore Roosevelt High School, graduating in 1935. Dorfsman had wanted to attend New York University and study bacteriology there, but was unable to afford the tuition. He chose to attend Cooper Union, where he received a four-year scholarship and graduated in 1939. Dorfsman served on Cooper Union's board of directors for many years.

== Career ==
=== Early career ===
After graduation, his design jobs included making displays for the 1939 New York World's Fair.

=== World War II ===
Dorfsman served in the United States Army during World War II, using his design skills.

=== Work with CBS ===
Dorfsman was hired in 1946 as art director for the CBS Radio Network. Dorfsman's designs were described by The New York Times as featuring "clear typography, simple slogans and smart illustration". He commissioned work from portraitist Feliks Topolski and painter Ben Shahn. After William Golden died in 1959, Dorfsman was named creative director of CBS Television. By 1964, he was selected as the director of design for all of CBS and was later promoted to senior vice president and creative director for marketing communications and design in 1968. In this role he maintained creative control over the network's use of the CBS Eye logo to its proprietary CBS Didot typeface. The Times credited the "cleverness and subtle beauty of his advertisements" with drawing viewers to the network's news and entertainment programs.

The print advertising Dorfsman created for CBS created a sense of urgency for the network's news and public affairs programming. A full-page newspaper ad for the series Of Black America showed a black man in black and white, with half his face painted with the stars and stripes of the United States flag. A newspaper ad for The Warren Report: A CBS News Inquiry in Four Parts showed a hand holding the John F. Kennedy assassination's "magic bullet" with a headline stating that "This is the bullet that hit both President Kennedy and Governor Connally. Or did it?" Advertising of CBS News coverage of the 1972 presidential election described CBS News anchorman Walter Cronkite as having been "Re-elected the Most Trusted Man in America".

Dorfsman oversaw design of annual reports for CBS and created promotional commemorative volumes, including a 1969 limited-edition book with a cover embossed to resemble the lunar surface, after the first crewed Moon landing. He designed sets for Walter Cronkite's CBS Evening News and for the CBS Morning News.

In Eero Saarinen's CBS Building on 52nd Street and Sixth Avenue, Dorfsman was responsible for all of the building's graphics, designating the type, design and spacing for wall clocks, elevator buttons, and elevator inspection stickers. He designed a 35-foot-wide (11 m), 8 1/2-foot-tall (2.6 m) mural called Gastrotypographicalassemblage for the building's cafeteria that listed all of the foods offered to patrons in hand-milled wood type. Dorfsman considered this work to be "his magnum opus, his gift to the world". The mural was displayed in the building until early 1990s. In 2014, it went through restoration and was moved to a building on the Hyde Park campus of the Culinary Institute of America in Hyde Park, New York.

== Later life and death ==
Dorfman retired from CBS in November 1987 to establish his own studio. The responsibilities for advertising, which had previously been handled in-house under Dorfsman's supervision, were transferred to Backer, Spielvogel, Bates.

Dorfsman died at age 90 on October 22, 2008, in Roslyn, New York of congestive heart failure.

== Honors and recognition ==
In 1978, Dorfsman was recognized as a medalist by the AIGA, "awarded to individuals in recognition of their exceptional achievements, services or other contributions to the field of design and visual communication". He was awarded the TDC Medal by the Type Directors Club in 1995.

The 1988 book Dorfsman & CBS by Dick Hess and Marion Muller covered his more than 40 years with the network.
