= William Underhill =

American artist (1933–2022)

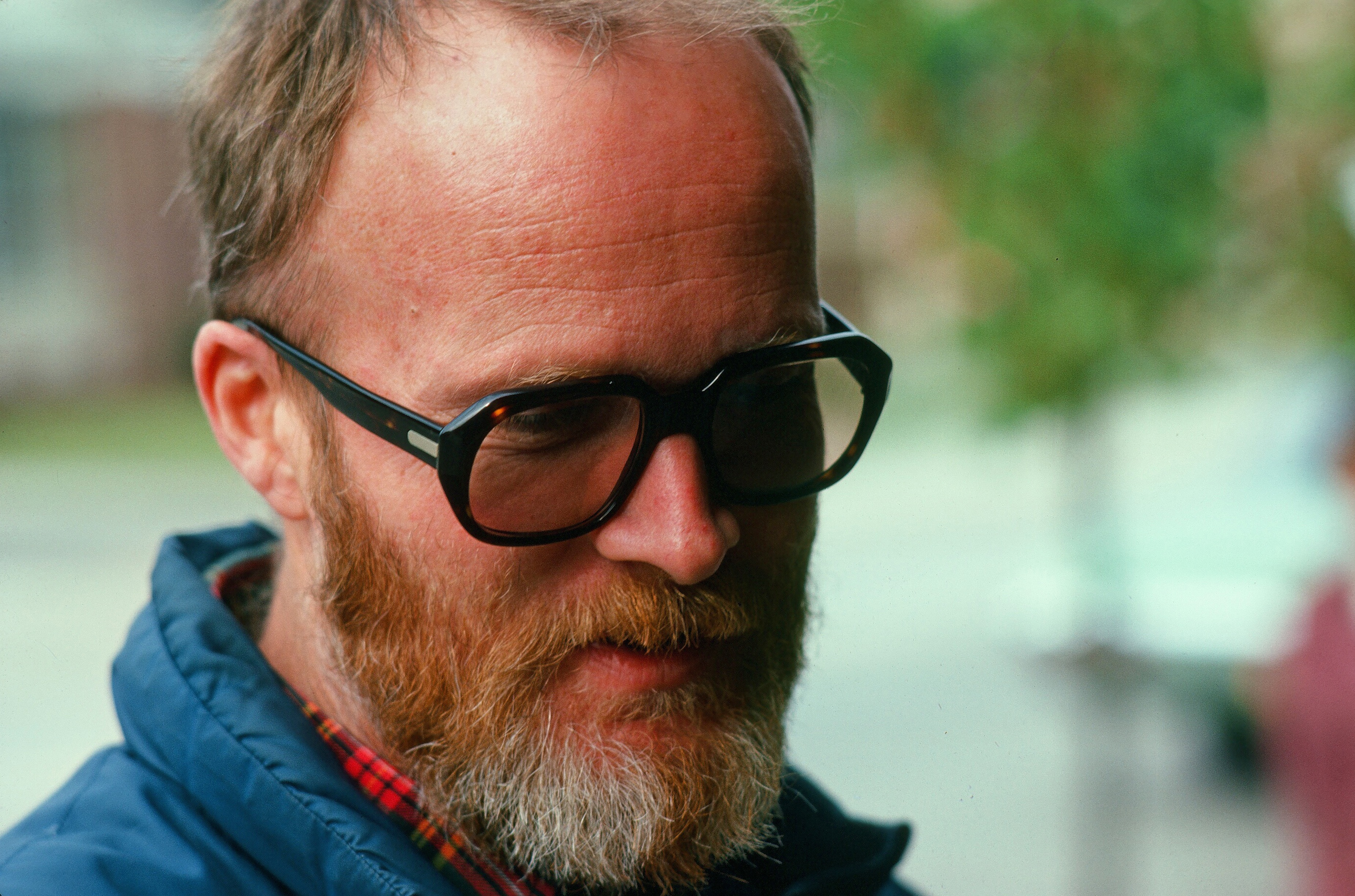
- Underhill c. 1985
- Born: April 13, 1933; Berkeley, California, U.S.
- Died: February 16, 2022 (aged 88); Wellsville, New York, U.S.
- Occupation: Metalsmith
- Spouses: Linn (Baldwin) Underhill (m. 1957; div. 1989) Linda (Leshinski) Underhill (m. 1989; died 2011)
- Children: 3

William Underhill (April 13, 1933 – February 16, 2022) was an American sculptor.

== Biography ==
=== Early life ===
Underhill was born on April 13, 1933, the son of Alfred Underhill and Katharine Gibbs Underhill. He studied at California College of Arts & Crafts, and the University of California, Berkeley. Underhill first majored in architecture, where he studied with Charles Eames and Buckminster Fuller. One of the first Fuller-inspired geodesic domes on the West Coast was designed and built in the 1956 at Lake Merritt Wildlife Refuge in Oakland, CA by a team of architecture students that included Underhill. Before he could finish his undergraduate studies, Underhill was drafted into the US Army in 1957, and served in Germany. After being discharged from the Army in 1959, he returned to the University of California, Berkeley to complete his studies. Underhill changed his major to art, studying with Peter Voulkos and Richard O'Hanlon. While at Berkeley, he also developed "a close, inspiring friendship" with ceramic artist Stephen De Staebler. Underhill received his B.A. in art in 1960 and his art M.A. in 1961, both from the University of California, Berkeley. In 1965, Underhill moved with his family to Brooklyn, New York, where he taught at the Pratt Institute.

=== Academic career ===
Alfred University invited Underhill to conduct a workshop in 1968. In 1969, he was offered a permanent position, where he taught sculpture until 1997. Underhill started Alfred University's first bronze foundry. He received grants from the National Endowment for the Arts and from the New York State Council for the Arts.

=== Work ===
In 1961, Underhill helped establish a foundry at Berkeley where he began to cast bronze sculptural forms. His technique involved using a clay vessel or mold coated with wax, essentially making a negative of the bronze casting. This is known as the lost wax process. Throughout his career, he made distinct geometric pots on stands and legs.

Underhill received several commissions for large steel installations through J. Gordon Lippincott. A significant early work was Ursa Major at the Lynden Sculpture Garden near Milwaukee, Wisconsin. The work is a trapezoidal abstract sculpture made of Cor-Ten [steel] and stands over 16m (53 feet) long and 8m (26 feet) high. Another outdoor installation is The Bride and Groom, at the Museum of the Creative Process in Manchester, Vermont.

In September, 1990, he installed the King Alfred the Great statue on the Alfred University campus. The statue stands as a landmark in the center of AU's quad and has become part of the university's annual traditions.

Underhill's work is held in numerous permanent collections, the Carnegie Institute Pittsburgh, PA; the Oakland Art Museum, Oakland, CA; the Cooper–Hewitt Museum and the Museum of Arts and Design, New York, NY; the Racine Art Museum, Racine WI; and the Los Angeles County Museum of Art, CA.

=== Personal life and death ===
William Underhill married photographer Linn Underhill (née Baldwin) on June 25, 1957. The couple had three children—Sarah, Joseph, and Katherine. The marriage ended in divorce. In 1989, Underhill married author and fellow Alfred University faculty member Linda Underhill, née Leshinski. They remained married until her death in 2011. William Underhill died in Wellsville, New York, on February 16, 2022, at the age of 88.
