= Jessica Hische =

American artist

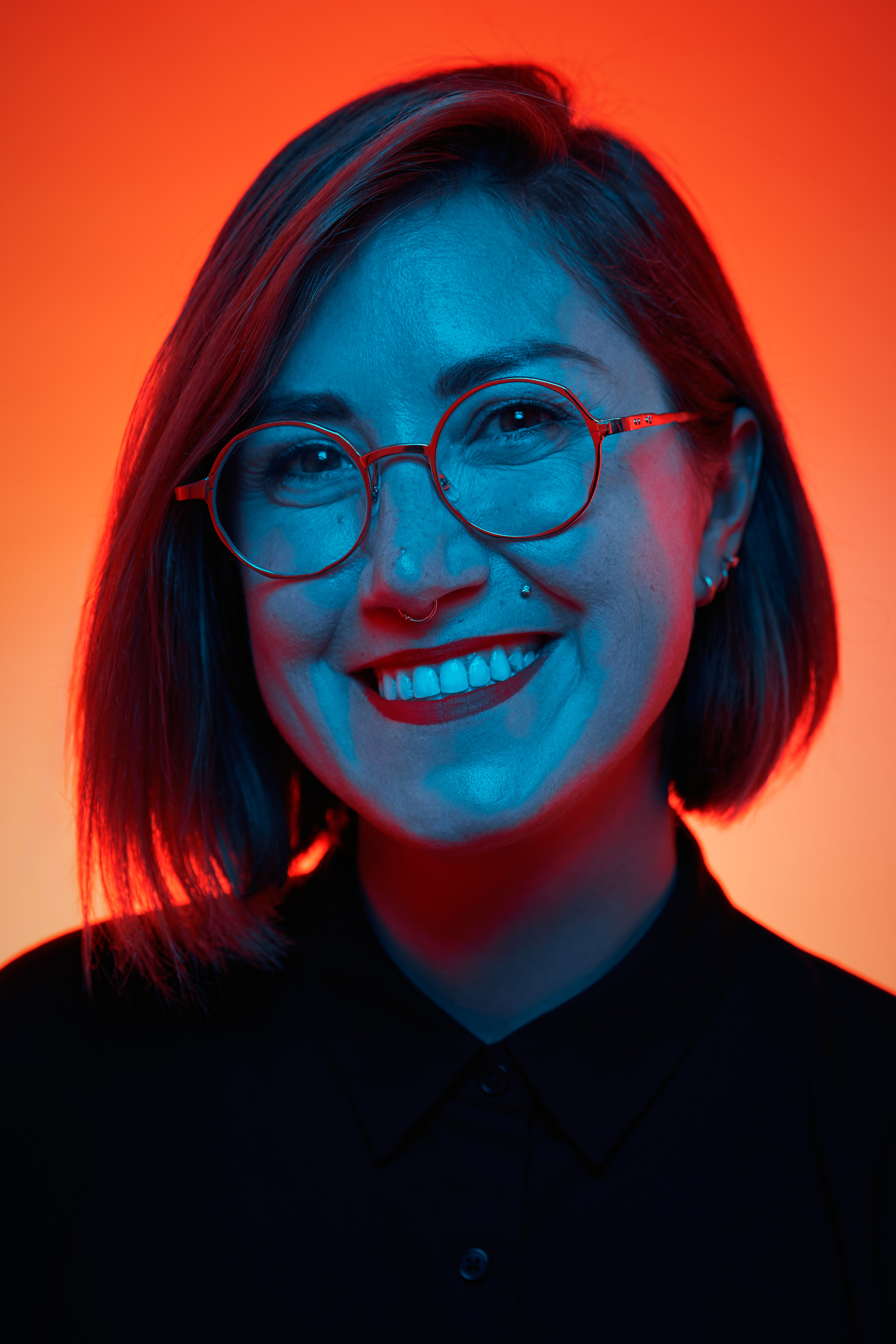
- Born: April 4, 1984 (age 42); Charleston, South Carolina
- Website: http://jessicahische.is/

Jessica Nicole Hische (/hɪʃ/ HISH; born April 4, 1984) is an American lettering artist, illustrator, author and type designer.

Hische published In Progress: See Inside a Lettering Artist's Sketchbook and Process, from Pencil to Vector (2015), covering her creative process and work she has completed as a hand-lettering artist. She has written and illustrated several children's books including Tomorrow I'll be Brave (2018) and Tomorrow I'll be Kind (2019).

== Early life ==
Hische was born in Charleston, South Carolina on April 4, 1984. She was raised in Hazleton, Pennsylvania, graduating from Hazleton Area High School in 2002. She attended Tyler School of Art in Philadelphia, graduating in 2006 with a BFA in Graphic and Interactive Design.

== Career ==
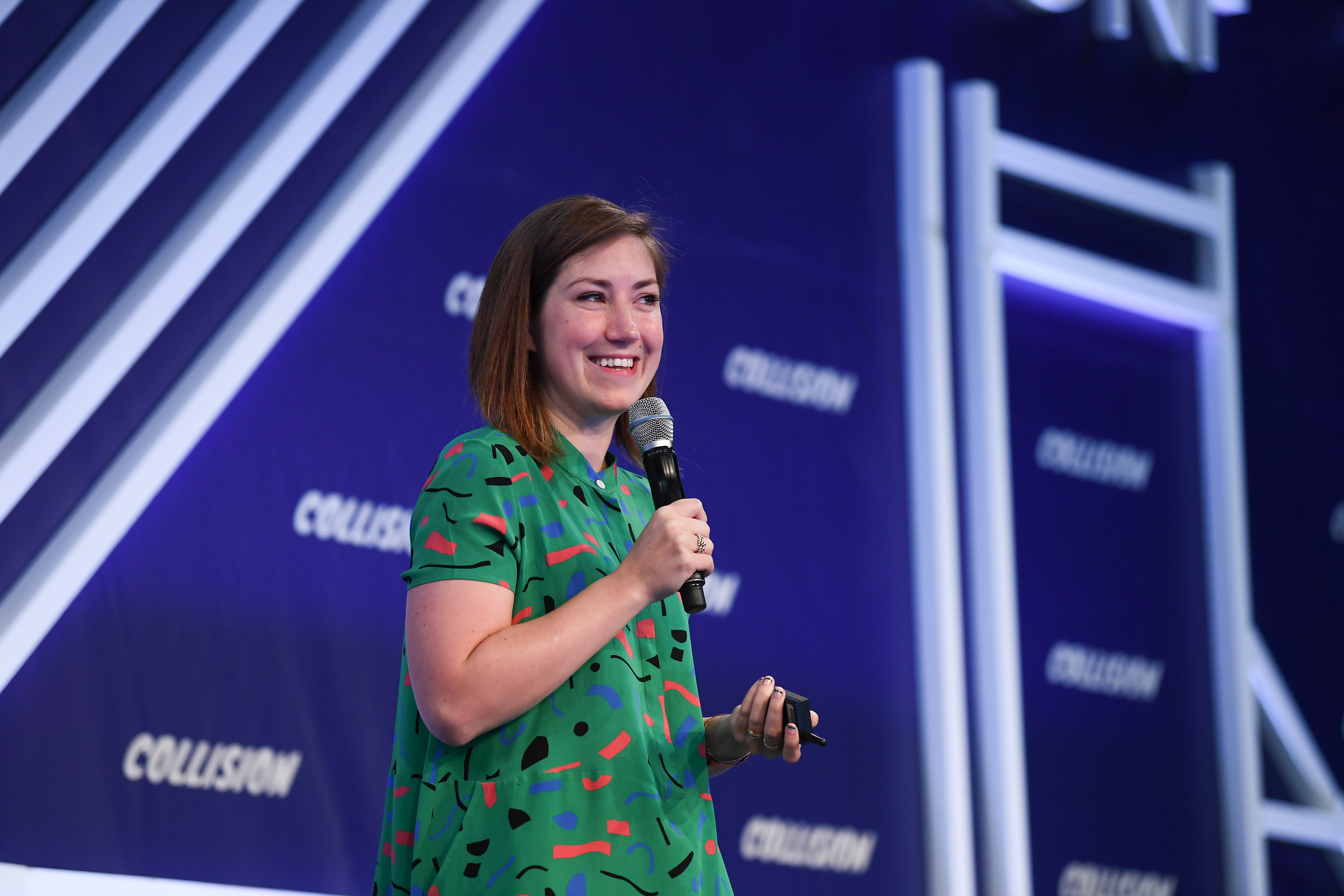
Jessica Hische as a speaker at the 2018 Collision Conf

After graduating in 2006, Hische worked for graphic design studio Headcase Design in Philadelphia, Pennsylvania. She moved to Brooklyn in early 2007 taking a position as Senior Designer at Louise Fili's studio, Louise Fili Ltd, where she worked until late 2009. Hische left Louise Fili Ltd to work independently as a letterer, illustrator, and type designer, citing her appreciation for the balance between work and personal life. During her time in New York, she shared studios with other artists and designers at The Pencil Factory and Studiomates in Brooklyn.

In 2012 Hische moved to the Bay Area, and from 2012 to 2020 worked out of Title Case, a San Francisco studio she shared with fellow letterer and designer, Erik Marinovich. In 2020 she relocated her studio to downtown Oakland in a space that operates as both her office and letterpress printing and laser-cutting workshop.

Hische contributes much of her early career success to a personal project, "Daily Drop Cap" and other side projects including the Should I Work for Free flowchart and "Don't Fear the Internet", a tutorial website that teaches basic HTML and CSS to beginner web designers co-created with her husband Russ Maschmeyer.

Hische was named to the Forbes 30 Under 30 list, was listed in GD USA as a Person to Watch, and has been featured as a Print New Visual Artist. She was honored with the Young Gun award by the Art Directors Club of New York in 2009.

She has worked with clients such as Wes Anderson (designing the titles for his film Moonrise Kingdom), Dave Eggers (designing the book covers for his novels A Hologram for the King (2012) and The Circle (2013).), Penguin Books, The New York Times, Tiffany & Co., OXFAM America, McSweeney’s, American Express, Target, Victoria's Secret, Chronicle Books, Nike, Samsung, Adobe, Apple, Barack Obama, Facebook, HarperCollins, Hershey's, Honda, Kellogg's, Macy's, UNICEF, NPR and Wired Magazine. She designed the packaging for comedian John Hodgman's comedy special John Hodgman: Ragnarok and the Grammy-nominated vinyl release of Wyatt Cenac's comedy album Brooklyn.

Hische has designed or contributed to the design of several postage stamps. Together with Louise Fili, Hische designed the "Love Ribbons" stamp for the US Postal Service, with over 250 million stamps sold. She collaborated with Fili for two other stamp designs: Sealed with Love (2013), and Skywriting (2015). In 2015 she created her first solo stamp for the US Postal Service, a love stamp titled Forever Hearts.

Hische teaches workshops about lettering and creative business practices in-person at her studio and online including through an online subscription-based platform Skillshare.

== Personal life ==
Hische married Russ Maschmeyer in 2012. Their wedding invitation website, a parallax-scrolling timeline of their relationship designed by the couple and contributed to by Hische's former studio mates at The Pencil Factory, was featured by Gawker in an article titled "The World's Most Hipster Wedding Announcement May Justify Outlawing Love". Due to an outpouring of support by Hische's fans, the site issued a retraction the following day. Hische and Maschmeyer have three children, Ramona Maschmeyer (b. 2015), Charlie Maschmeyer (b. 2017), and George Maschmeyer (b. 2019). They live in Oakland, California.

== Influences ==
As a child, Hische loved drawing and drew bubble letters of her friend's names. Her childhood influenced her career in lettering design. She counts designers Matthew Carter, Marian Bantjes, Chris Ware, Doyald Young, Ed Benguiat, and Alex Trochut among her influences in type and lettering.

== Bibliography ==
- Amelia Lost. Schwartz & Wade/Random, 2011. Illustrated by Hische.
- Tomorrow I'll Be Brave. Penguin Workshop, 2018.
- Tomorrow I'll Be Kind. Penguin Workshop, 2019.
- Who Will U Be? Penguin Workshop, 2023.
- My First Book of Fancy Letters. Penguin Workshop, 2024.

== Typefaces ==
Though Hische predominantly works in lettering, she has produced a number of commercial and proprietary typefaces.

- Buttermilk™ (2009)
- Snowflake (2010)
- Brioche
- Minot (2013)
- Silencio Sans (2014)
- Tilda (2014) - the typeface Hische developed for the 2012 Wes Anderson film Moonrise Kingdom.

== Sources ==
- Breuer, Gerda, Meer, Julia (ed): Women in Graphic Design, p. 475, Jovis, Berlin 2012 (ISBN 978-3-86859-153-8)
- Hische, Jessica and Fili, Louise (preface): In Progress: See Inside a Lettering Artist's Sketchbook and Process, from Pencil to Vector. Chronicle Books, 2015 (ISBN 978-1452136226)
