= Mae (given name) =

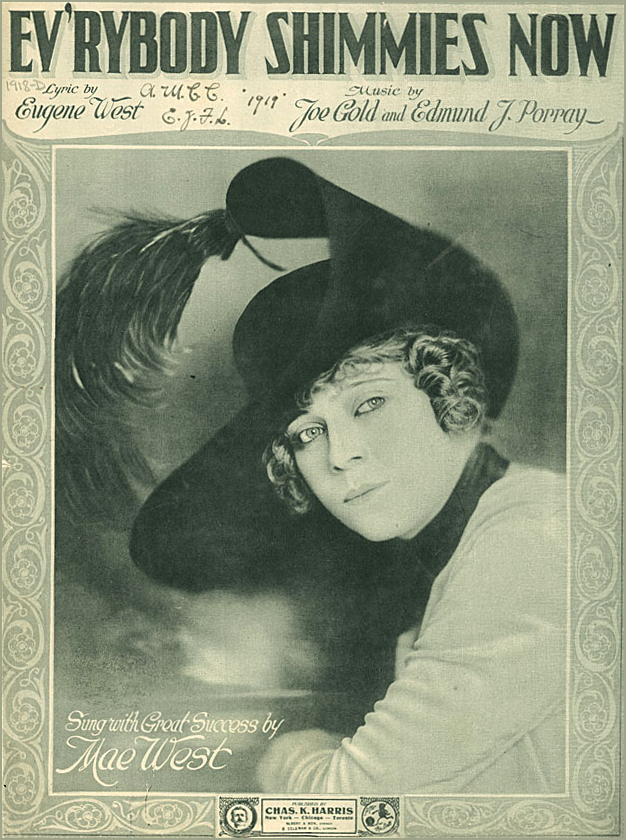
- Mae West in 1918
- Pronunciation: MAY
- Gender: Female
- Language: English

Other names
- Related names: May, Maya, Maia, Mary, Margaret, Mabel, Maeve

Mae is a feminine given name primarily used in English-speaking countries. Often regarded as a variant of May, it is associated with the Roman goddess Maia, symbolizing spring, growth, and fertility. The name gained popularity in the late 19th and early 20th centuries and is frequently used as a vintage-style given or middle name. Mae also serves as a diminutive for several longer names, including Mary (from Hebrew, meaning "beloved" or "bitter"), Margaret (from Greek, meaning "pearl"), and Mabel (from Latin amabilis, meaning "lovable"). In some cases, it is used as a modern or anglicized form of the Irish name Maeve, derived from Old Irish Medb, meaning "she who intoxicates" or "mead-woman."

Mae may refer to:

== People ==
=== Singers ===
- Mae Moore, Canadian singer
- Mae Muller (born 1997), English singer
- Mae Stephens (born 2003), English singer

=== Actors ===
- Mae Bramhall (c.1861–1897), American actress and writer
- Mae Busch (1891–1946), Australian actress
- Mae Clarke (1910–1992), American actress
- Mae Marsh (1894–1968), American movie actress
- Mae Martin (born 1987), Canadian comedian and actor
- Mae Murray (1885–1965), American silent film actress
- Mae Questel (1908–1998), American actress
- Mae West (1893–1980), American actress (after whom are named a variety of otherwise unrelated items)
- Mae Whitman (born 1988), American actress

=== In other fields ===
- Mae Batherson (born 2000), Canadian ice hockey player
- Mae Brussell (1922–1988), American radio personality
- Mae Carroll Fry, American politician and schoolteacher
- Mae Jemison (born 1956), the first African-American woman to travel to space
- Mae Schmidle (1927–2019), American politician
- Mae Schunk (born 1934), the 45th Lieutenant Governor of Minnesota
- Mae Woughter Strack (died 1941), American nurse and artist
- Mae Tischer (1928–2018), American politician

== Fictional characters ==
- Mae the Panda Fairy, a character and in the self-titled novel in the series Rainbow Magic
- Mae Borowski, a character in the video game Night in the Woods
- Mae Holland, a character in the novels The Circle and The Every and the former's film adaptation
- Mary Mae Ward, a character in the soap opera General Hospital
