= Zeitoun (book) =

2009 nonfiction book written by Dave Eggers

- The cover of Zeitoun, illustrated by Rachell Sumpter.
- Author: Dave Eggers
- Language: English
- Subject: Hurricane Katrina
- Genre: Nonfiction
- Published: 2009 (McSweeney's)
- Publication place: United States
- Media type: hardcover, paperback
- Pages: 351
- ISBN: 9781934781630
- OCLC: 332257182
- Preceded by: The Wild Things
- Followed by: A Hologram for the King

Zeitoun is a nonfiction book written by Dave Eggers and published by McSweeney's in 2009. It tells the story of Abdulrahman Zeitoun, the Syrian-American owner of a painting and contracting company in New Orleans, Louisiana, who chose to ride out Hurricane Katrina in his Uptown home.

After the hurricane, he traveled the flooded city in a secondhand canoe rescuing neighbors, caring for abandoned pets and distributing fresh water, but was arrested without reason or explanation at one of his rental houses, along with three others, by a mixed group of U.S. Army National Guard soldiers and local police officers. Zeitoun and the others were accused of terrorist activities, presumably because of the large amount of money found in their possession as well as maps of the city and a storage disc. Zeitoun was freed after 23 days but his companions were incarcerated for as long as 8 months. Zeitoun was refused medical attention and the use of a phone to alert his family. His wife and daughters, who were staying with friends far away from the city, only knew that he had disappeared.

== Plot summary ==
Abdulrahman Zeitoun grew up in Syria. After a few years of apprenticeship in the Syrian port city of Jableh, Zeitoun spent twenty years working at sea as a crewman, engineer and fisherman. During this time he traveled the world and eventually settled in the United States in 1988. Zeitoun met his wife Kathy, a native of Baton Rouge, with whom he founded their business, Zeitoun Painting Contractors LLC. Kathy converted to Islam.

In late August 2005, as Hurricane Katrina approached the city, Kathy and their four children left New Orleans for Baton Rouge. Zeitoun stayed behind to watch over their home, ongoing job sites and rental properties. Once the storm made landfall, their neighborhood (although miles from the nearest levees) was flooded up to the second floor of most houses. Zeitoun began to explore the city in a secondhand canoe, distributing what supplies he had, ferrying neighbors to higher ground and caring for abandoned dogs.

On September 6, Zeitoun and three companions were arrested at one of Zeitoun's rental houses by a mixed group of U.S. Army National Guardsmen, local police and police from out of state. They were detained in a makeshift jail in a Greyhound bus station – "Camp Greyhound" – for three days before being transferred to Elayn Hunt Correctional Center in nearby St. Gabriel, Louisiana. Zeitoun was held at Hunt for 20 more days without trial, but he was given a bond of 75 thousand dollars and read his charges. He was interviewed by officers and later by ICE officials and put in segregated cells.

== Writing procedure ==
Eggers began work on the book in 2006, after meeting Kathy and Abdulrahman through another McSweeney's project called Voices from the Storm. He worked closely with the Zeitoun family while researching and writing the book, meeting with them multiple times in New Orleans and letting them read six or seven versions of the manuscript. Eggers visited members of the Zeitoun family living in Syria, as well as Abdulrahman's brother Ahmad, who lives in Spain. Eggers said he would not personally make money from the book's publication; any funds from the book would be distributed by the Zeitoun Foundation, a nonprofit set up by Eggers and the Zeitoun family.

== Reception ==
Entertainment Weekly put it on its end-of-the-decade "best-of" list, saying of Eggers that, "He kicked off the decade as the look-at-me stylist behind 2000's A Heartbreaking Work of Staggering Genius. The fact that Eggers bookended it with this gut-wrenchingly poignant and selfless Katrina story proves that even boy wonders can grow up."

== Awards ==
- 2009 Los Angeles Times Book Prize, Current Interest)
- 2010 American Book Award
- 2010 Northern California Book Award, Creative Nonfiction (Nomination)
- 2010 Dayton Literary Peace Prize

== Film conversion ==
In 2009, an animated film based on the book was announced, set to be directed by Jonathan Demme. However, in May 2014, The Playlist reported that the film was "percolat[ing] in development".

== Aftermath ==
The book describes the difficulty Kathy had in the years afterward coping with the stress of the jailing and related events. The couple's relationship deteriorated in subsequent years, and they divorced in 2012.

In August 2012, Abdulrahman Zeitoun was charged with plotting to have Kathy Zeitoun, her son, and another man murdered. In July 2013, Zeitoun was tried and found not guilty of charges of attempted first-degree murder and solicitation of first-degree murder. The state's main witness, who had an extensive multi-state criminal record, was found not credible. In 2016, Zeitoun was convicted of felony stalking his ex-wife. In September 2018, after completing his prison sentence, Zeitoun was ordered deported by an immigration judge, but then freed from federal detention, as his native Syria was in the midst of a civil war and had no diplomatic relations in place to facilitate receiving deportees.
