= You Shall Know Our Velocity =

Book by Dave Eggers

You Shall Know Our Velocity!
- First edition
- Author: Dave Eggers
- Language: English
- Genre: Novel
- Published: 2002 (McSweeney's)
- Publication place: United States
- Media type: Print (hardcover & paperback)
- Pages: 371 pp (first edition, hardcover)
- ISBN: 0-9703355-5-5 (first edition, hardcover)
- OCLC: 50752111
- Dewey Decimal: 813/.6 22
- LC Class: PS3605.G48 Y68 2002
- Followed by: "The Only Meaning of the Oil-Wet Water"

You Shall Know Our Velocity! is a 2002 novel by Dave Eggers. It was Eggers's debut novel, following the success of his memoir A Heartbreaking Work of Staggering Genius (2000).

The plot follows Will and Hand, two childhood friends who set out on a week-long around-the-world odyssey, ostensibly to give away a large sum of money.

== Plot summary ==
Will has surprisingly come into a large amount of money, around $32,000. His photograph screwing in a light bulb has been made into a silhouette and is being used as a picture for a lighting company's light bulb boxes. He is uncomfortable having this money since he feels he did nothing to earn it and is left with guilt and purposelessness. Shortly after receiving the sum, Will and Hand's mutual childhood friend, Jack, was involved in a car accident. The pair had delusional ambitions to use the money to save his life, but to no avail. After Jack's death, Will and Hand are asked to help go through Jack's possessions in a storage facility, where Hand decides to wander around and leaves Will.

During Hand's absence, Will is brutally beaten by three men. Will and Hand agree that it is best not to go to the hospital lest the attackers attempt to track them. As a result of his confusion due to a conglomerate of issues, such as the large sum of money, Jack's death, Will's beating, and other personal issues, Will and Hand plan to travel around the world, visiting obscure countries and giving away all the money, bit by bit, to people they arbitrarily decide are most deserving. According to Hand, they gave to people for the benefit of both parties as a sacrament to restore faith in humanity.

The two devise many creative ways of distributing the unwanted money. One plan involves taping money to a donkey in a graph paper pouch that reads "HERE I AM ROCK YOU LIKE A HURRICANE" and another creating a treasure map for Estonian children. While on the journey, the two friends do many wild and spontaneous things, including practicing rolling over cars and jumping from tree to tree while 20 feet in the air. However, their quest proves surprisingly tricky without a solid set of criteria or a definitive direction in their plan. They experience much awkward confusion and moral uncertainty, and they often fear being robbed and killed. Will becomes unstable and begins to lose his composure.

The plot is both a log of the journey and a look into the narrator's mind, Will.

A pseudo-sequel, titled The Only Meaning of the Oil-Wet Water, follows Hand and the minor character Pilar in Central America. This short story is featured in the collection How We Are Hungry: Stories (2004).

== Different editions ==
In February 2003, Eggers and McSweeney's published Sacrament, a retitled hardcover edition of You Shall Know Our Velocity that included a new 48-page section inserted into the middle of the story. The U.S. trade paperback edition of You Shall Know Our Velocity! (with an exclamation point added to the title), released later that year by Vintage, includes this new material. The addition, narrated by Hand, calls into question the reliability of the narrator, and, depending on which version is read, You Shall Know Our Velocity can be viewed as two different stories. In Hand's version, their third friend, Jack, never existed. Instead, he is a metaphorical representation of Will's mother, a device Will used to cope with the loss that occurred several years before the trip (rather than alive and in contact with Will as in his version). Hand also corrects one of the most startling scenes in Will's version, in which Will breaks down emotionally, claiming that Will was too shy to do such a thing. Hand does say that Will's version was 85% true, though he did hate the title, renaming it "Sacrament".

Will narrated the original version entirely. In the world of the revised version, Will's memoirs were published six years earlier. Hand has taken it upon himself to insert his perspective immediately after the story's climax. Hand's meta-narrative is entirely self-contained, and it is as much a personal digression as it is a relevant critique of the story as presented by Will.

For the hardcover version of You Shall Know Our Velocity, the opening paragraph is printed directly on the front cover. In Sacrament, Hand alludes to the opening paragraph being written by a ghostwriter.

== Film adaptation ==
The book was optioned by Process Productions, with Miguel Arteta attached to direct.
