= Anna Mae =

Anna Mae (also Anna May) is a feminine double name, composed of Anna and Mae. Notable people with the name include:

- Anna Mae Aquash (1945–1975), Mi'kmaq activist and member of the American Indian Movement
- Anna Mae Bullock, better known as Tina Turner (1939–2023), American singer
- Anna May Hutchison (1925–1998), baseball player
- Anna Mae Kelly, better known as Mae Stephens, English singer-songwriter
- Anna Mae Hays (1920–2018), brigadier general in the United States Army
- Anna Mae He (born 1999), the subject of a custody battle between He's biological parents and foster parents
- Anna May Hutchison (1925–1998), American baseball player
- Anna Mae O'Dowd (1929–2018), American baseball player
- Anna Mae Pallanck (died 2013), American politician
- Anna Mae Routledge (born 1982), Canadian actress
- Anna Mae Walthall, American actress
- Anna May Waters (1903–1987), Canadian nurse
- Anna Mae Winburn (1913–1999), African-American vocalist and jazz bandleader
- Anna May Wong (1905–1961), Chinese American movie star

== Television ==
- "Anna Mae", the final episode of How to Get Away with Murder's second season.
