= The Captain and the Glory: An Entertainment =

2019 novella by Dave Eggers

- Author: Dave Eggers
- Genre: Satirical fiction, political satire
- Publisher: Alfred A. Knopf
- Publication date: 2019-11-19
- Pages: 128
- ISBN: 978-0-525-65908-2
- OCLC: 1121341883
- Preceded by: The Parade
- Followed by: The Every

The Captain and the Glory: An Entertainment is a satirical novella written by American author Dave Eggers, published by Alfred A. Knopf on November 19, 2019.

== Reception ==
Sandra Newman of The Guardian said "it is successful as a gift book" but "as a significant satire of the political crisis in America, it falls woefully short." The Times reviewer Johanna Thomas-Corr wrote that the book "risks coming over as smug and condescending" and "is funny because it's true".

== See also ==
- Donald Trump in popular culture
