= Camp Greyhound =

Temporary detention center

- Location: New Orleans, Louisiana, U.S.
- Status: Closed
- Population: 220 (at peak)
- Opened: September 2005
- Closed: October 2005
- Managed by: Louisiana Department of Corrections

Camp Greyhound is the nickname of a temporary makeshift jail at the Greyhound Bus station next to the New Orleans Union Passenger Terminal that was operated in the aftermath of Hurricane Katrina of August 29, 2005.

== Operation ==
The construction of Camp Greyhound by the Louisiana Department of Corrections was one of the top priorities in the rebuilding of New Orleans. Sixteen cages of chain-link fencing topped with razor wire were erected at the bus station under the canopies to house up to 700 people. Work was done by prisoners from the Louisiana State Penitentiary at Angola under the direction of Burl Cain. Most suspects had been arrested for looting, while others were detained for curfew violation, vehicle theft, intoxication, or resisting arrest. By September 8, nine inmates had been incarcerated for attempted murder.

An outdoor cage could hold about 45 people. There was no furniture, and inmates had to sleep on the asphalt ground of the bus station without mattresses, using an open portable toilet. Food consisted of military issued meals. The facility was fully lit at night with electric power generated by an Amtrak engine running 24 hours. Inmates were guarded by officers from the Louisiana State Penitentiary at Angola. At least five mercenary companies were enlisted to round up "prisoners" and keep the jail running. The camp was protected by the National Guard on the outside.

The jail had a processing center where inmates were photographed and fingerprinted. The single public defender was unable to offer individual advice; the only options were to plead guilty and agree to community service, or to be sent to a permanent facility and wait a minimum of 21 days for further processing. In the latter case, inmates were bused to permanent facilities.

The first inmates were apparently placed into the facility on Monday, September 5, 2005. Clad in prison-orange, they were not allowed to notify relatives or lawyers, and no phone calls were permitted. A report by The Washington Times from September 9, 2005, indicated that over 220 people suspected of looting were at Camp Greyhound at that time.

Camp Greyhound operated for about six weeks or two months.

== Denial of constitutional rights ==
The collapse of the judicial system after the hurricane affected people held at Camp Greyhound. About 1,200 people, mostly African-Americans, passed through the jail, and regular judicial proceedings were not followed, violating habeas corpus rights. By the end of its operation, exaggerated reports of unrest, looting, and violence started to be revised and retracted. Indeed, a small number of NOPD officers were reported to have participated in the looting.

Reports emerged indicating innocent people being incarcerated for a prolonged time; first at Camp Greyhound and then transferred to outside prisons. James Terry was arrested for "looting" his own apartment. He spent time at Camp Greyhound and then at a permanent jail without ever having access to a lawyer, being charged with a crime, or having a court hearing before his eventual release seven months later. Pedro Parra-Sanchez went through Camp Greyhound on October 13, 2005, and disappeared in the penal system for 13 months. Abdulrahman Zeitoun's case was documented in the eponymous book by David Eggers. He was released after one month, while his companions were held five, six, and eight months more, all without due process. Another inmate, Ashton O'Dwyer, an attorney, claimed that he was pepper-sprayed and shot with beanbag rounds while in custody. He was never charged with a crime, and his lawsuit regarding his incarceration was unsuccessful. In contrast, a jury later awarded $650,000 to two tourists who had been caught in the system.

== Legacy ==
In 2009, Dan Berger argued that journalistic routines and uncritical reporting by the media "legitimated punishment as disaster policy" and "suggested militarized policing and imprisonment as fundamental to restore order". In 2011, James Fox from the New Statesman opined that Camp Greyhound was "known for organized brutality, a little-known, near-exact facsimile of Guantanamo Bay".
