= Marian Bantjes =

Canadian graphic designer

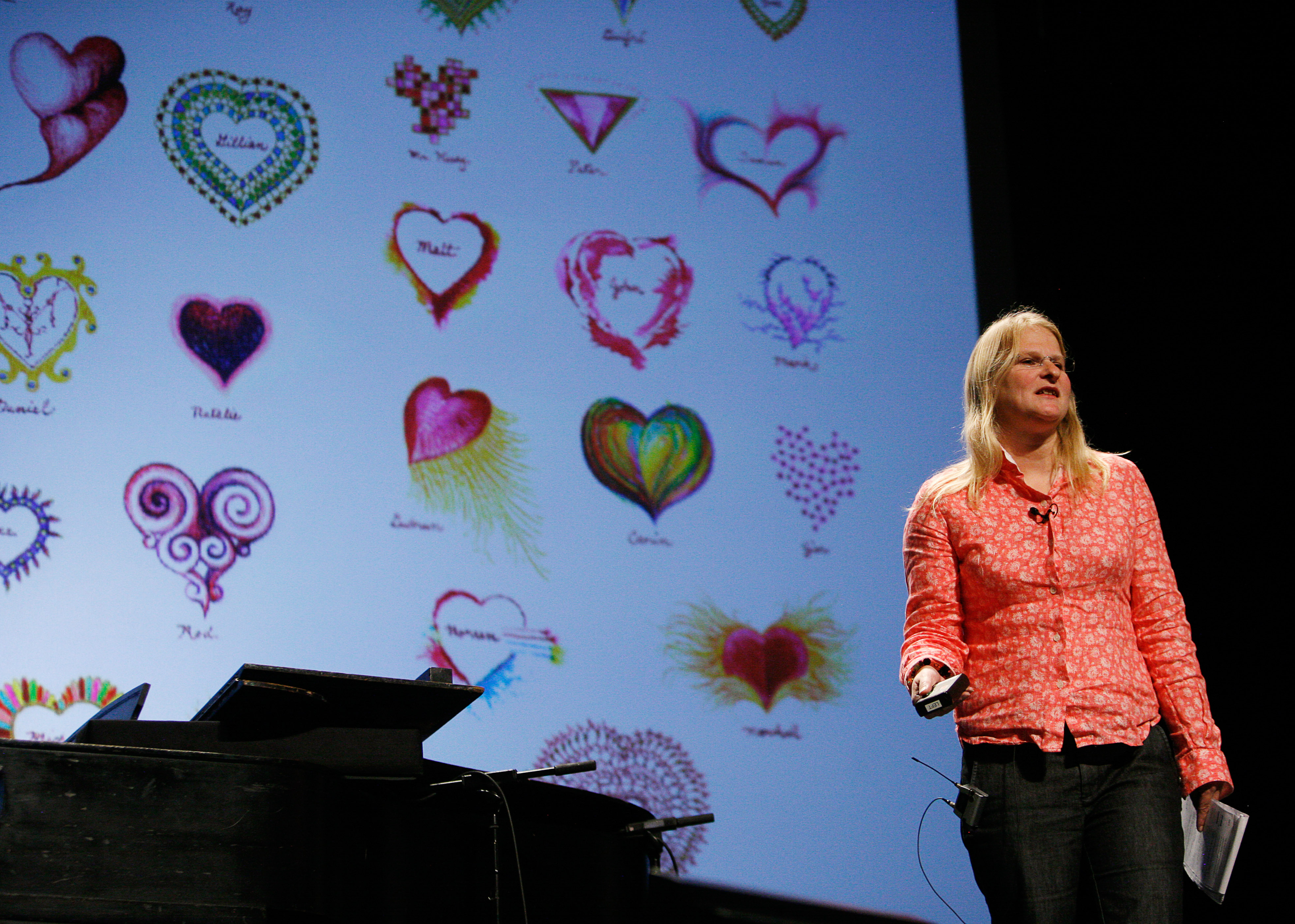
- Designer Marian Bantjes at Pop!Tech 2008.
- Born: 1963 (age 62–63)
- Occupations: Typographer, Illustrator, Graphic Designer
- Website: bantjes.com

Marian Bantjes (born 1963) is a Canadian designer, artist, illustrator, typographer and writer. Describing her work as graphic art, Marian Bantjes is known for her custom lettering, intricate patterning and decorative style. Inspired by illuminated manuscripts, Islamic calligraphy, Baroque ornamentation, Marian Bantjes creates detailed work, often combining the forms of her disparate influences.

Marian Bantjes has published two books.

== Biography ==
Born in 1963, Marian Bantjes grew up in Saskatchewan, Canada. She studied art for a year in 1982, before dropping out.

She started working in the field of visual communication in 1983 and worked as a book typesetter from 1984 to 1994 for Hartley & Marks. She became well known as a talented graphic designer from 1994 to 2003, when she was a partner and senior designer at Digitopolis in Vancouver, British Columbia, Canada, where she created identity and communication designs for a wide range of corporate, education and arts organizations. She owned and ran the design firm, with a small staff.

In 2003, Marian left her firm and "strategic design" behind to embark on the work that she has since become internationally known for. Describing herself as a graphic artist, working primarily with custom type and ornament, Bantjes' highly personal, detailed and sometimes strange graphic work has brought her international recognition and fame as a visual designer. Bantjes is known for her detailed and precise vector art, hand work, patterning and highly ornamental style.

Stefan Sagmeister calls Bantjes "one of the most innovative typographers working today," and Noreen Morioka calls Bantjes "the Doyald Young of her generation." In 2005, Bantjes was named one of 25 up-and-coming Designers to Watch (STEP Magazine, January 2005).

Bantjes' clients include Pentagram, Stefan Sagmeister, Saks Fifth Avenue, Bruce Mau Design, Young & Rubicam Chicago, Anni Kuan, Houghton Mifflin, Print Magazine, Wallpaper* , WIRED, The Guardian (UK), The New York Times, among others. She has also worked on design materials for AIGA, TypeCon 2007, and the Society of Graphic Designers of Canada (GDC).

Her work has been featured in STEP, étapes (Paris), Azure, Matrix (Quebec) Tupigrafia (Brazil) and Print, Fontshop's Font 004, and Eye magazine (#58). She has written the design book "I wonder", published by the Monacelli Press, which was dubbed one of the 13 best design books of 2010 by Fastco design. Bantjes has been honored with numerous awards and her work is now part of the permanent collection at the Cooper-Hewitt National Design Museum.

Bantjes is an accomplished writer on the subjects of typography and design, and was a regular contributor to the popular design website Speak Up. Speak Up is no longer in publication. Bantjes is frequently invited to sit on design award juries and speak at design conferences – such as Trimarchi in 2008 – and design schools around the world. Bantjes says "throwing your individuality into a project is heresy" but she has built a career doing just that, as her signature style is unmistakable. In 2007, she released Restraint, a typeface that integrates her style of ornamentation to be used as shapes and borders.

From 2002–2006, Bantjes served as the Communications VP of the Society of Graphic Designers in British Columbia. She was also the Chair and Creative Director of the 2006 Graphex Canadian design awards. In 2008, Bantjes was invited back to serve as a judge for 'Graphex 2008 Canadian National Design Awards'. Bantjes lives and works internationally from her base on Bowen Island off the west coast of Canada, near Vancouver, British Columbia.

== Shows ==
- March 2008 - Included in the exhibit "Rococo: The Continuing Curve" at the Cooper Hewitt National Design Museum (Smithsonian), New York, NY.
- Jan–Feb 2009 - Solo exhibit at the University Art Gallery, Department of Art and Design, California Polytechnic State University, San Luis Obispo, CA
- December 2009 - Included in the exhibit "Lubalin Now," at The Cooper Union, School of Art, New York, NY.
- April 2010 - One of 14 designers represented in droog’s "Saved by droog" exhibit at the Salone del Mobile in Milan, Italy.
- July–October 2010 - Centraal Museum Utrecht, Netherlands in "Saved by droog" collection.
- March–June 2011 - Solo exhibit - OnSite Gallery at OCAD, Ontario College of Art and Design, Toronto, ON, Canada
- June 2013 - Included in the exhibit "Work at Play," at the Chicago Design Museum, Chicago, IL.

== Awards ==
- Print’s Regional Design Annual, Certificate of Excellence, with Stefan Sagmeister for "The Vanity of Allegory". 2006.
- Communication Arts, Award of Excellence, (as writer) with Pentagram for "The Alphabet." 2007.
- Print’s Regional Design Annual, Certificate of Excellence, with Pentagram for "Yale School of Architecture, Seduction Poster". 2007.
- 26th Annual Western Magazine Awards. For illustration "My Dear Can We Work Together" in Vancouver Review. 2008.
- Type Directors’ Club tdc2. With Ross Mills for the font "Restraint". 2008.
- Type Directors’ Club 54. For the TypeCon 2007 material. 2008.
- Communication Arts Design Annual 2009. With Pentagram for Strathmore paper ream wrap.
