= Heroes of the Frontier =

2016 novel by Dave Eggers

- First edition (US)
- Author: Dave Eggers
- Publisher: Knopf (US); Hamish Hamilton (UK)
- Publication date: July 26, 2016
- Publication place: United States
- Media type: Print (Hardcover)
- Pages: 400 (Hardcover)
- ISBN: 9780451493804

Heroes of the Frontier is a 2016 novel by Dave Eggers. It concerns a dentist who moves with her children to Alaska after a failed relationship with the children's father.
