= Your Fathers, Where Are They? And the Prophets, Do They Live Forever? =

2014 novel by Dave Eggers

- Author: Dave Eggers
- Cover artist: T. S. Hawkins and Stephanie Ross
- Language: English
- Genre: Novel
- Publisher: Alfred A. Knopf, McSweeney's
- Publication date: June 17, 2014
- Publication place: United States
- Media type: Print (hardcover and electronic book) and audiobook
- Pages: 212 pp (first edition, hardcover)
- ISBN: 978-1-101-87419-6 (first edition, hardcover), ISBN 978-0-307-94754-3 (eBook)

Your Fathers, Where Are They? And the Prophets, Do They Live Forever? is a 2014 novel by Dave Eggers. The book's title is a quotation from the Bible (Zechariah 1:5).

== Plot summary ==
The book, told entirely in dialogue, follows the story of Thomas, a troubled man in his thirties haunted by the death of his friend Don Banh in a police shooting two years earlier. In an attempt to resolve the questions in his mind, he kidnaps seven people and brings them to a deserted Army base on the California coast, where he chains them to posts inside the abandoned buildings and forces them to discuss issues of concern to him, principally the lack of purpose and direction granted by American society to young men like him.

Thomas first kidnaps Kev Paciorek, a NASA astronaut he knew slightly in college, who always dreamed of flying on the Space Shuttle but has now lost that opportunity with the end of the Shuttle program. Next, Thomas abducts former Congressman Mac Dickinson, a Vietnam veteran who lost two limbs in a grenade accident during the war. The third kidnap victim is a former middle-school teacher who was accused of molesting students and may have molested Thomas and Don. Thomas also abducts his mother, a longtime addict who failed to protect Thomas from the teacher and her string of boyfriends but places the responsibility for his problems on Thomas himself, claiming that he was always strange. Thomas abducts a police officer to discuss the police procedures that led to Don's death (including the 21 Foot Rule), but is shocked to realize that the officer was one of those who shot his friend. The sixth victim is the director of patient access at the hospital where Don died, whom Thomas blames for her role in the cover-up of the fact that Don was shot seventeen times rather than the three claimed in the official report. Thomas had committed arson at the hospital to protest the cover-up but was never charged with the crime.

Thomas' final kidnapping is of Sara, a young woman he has seen walking on the beach beside the Army base during his time there. He believes that he and Sara are destined to be together and asks her to escape with him in a boat. She initially refuses and then claims she has changed her mind, but Thomas realizes she is lying and wants to escape. As police helicopters approach, Thomas returns to the congressman, the one person he kidnapped who he feels has given him understanding and good advice. The book ends as the police arrive and the congressman tells them everyone is safe.

== Reception ==
Publishers Weekly described the book as "more tedious deposition than gripping drama." Kirkus Reviews said that "Eggers turns this novel's contrivances into an asset, though overall it feels more like a series of philosophy-symposium prompts than a full-fledged story." The Wall Street Journal commented that "Mr. Eggers creates no plausible characters or dramatic tension". USA Today rated the book two stars out of four, describing it as "Insightful, yes, but sadly no more memorable than tomorrow's headlines." Entertainment Weekly gave the novel a grade of "B−", saying that "the belabored message would've better served a short story than this 200-plus-page hammer to the head."
