= The Circle (Eggers novel) =

2013 novel by Dave Eggers

- Book cover of The Circle
- Author: Dave Eggers
- Cover artist: Jessica Hische
- Language: English
- Genre: Science fiction, dystopian fiction
- Publisher: Knopf
- Publication date: October 8, 2013
- Publication place: United States
- Media type: Print (hardback & paperback), audiobook, e-book
- Pages: 504 pp. (first edition, hardcover)
- ISBN: 978-0-385-35139-3 (first edition, hardcover)

The Circle is a 2013 dystopian novel written by American author Dave Eggers. The novel chronicles tech worker Mae Holland as she joins a powerful Internet company. Her initially rewarding experience turns darker.

== Plot summary ==
Mae Holland, a recent college graduate, lands a job at The Circle, a powerful technology company run by the "Three Wise Men." Mae owes her job largely to her best friend and college roommate, Annie, one of the forty most influential people in the company. Mae starts out in Customer Experience (CE), the firm's customer service department, but quickly climbs the company ladder. From the beginning, Mae is impressed by amenities at The Circle, including access to top-notch technology, dorm-like housing, gyms, recreation activities and parties. Mae's very first day at The Circle ends with a party where she encounters Francis, who remains a love interest throughout the rest of the novel. Later, Mae encounters and quickly becomes romantically involved with a mysterious colleague named Kalden, even though she is unable to verify his status at the company, or even obtain his last name.

Meanwhile, The Circle continues to develop a range of sophisticated technologies, including SeeChange: light, portable cameras that can provide real-time video with minimal effort. Eventually, SeeChange cameras are worn all day long by politicians wishing to be 'transparent', allowing the public to see what they are seeing at all times.

Another subplot is the diagnosis of Mae's father with multiple sclerosis, which eventually leads Mae to enroll her parents on her healthcare, which in turn drives them to install SeeChange cameras in their home. After a brief incident with her own legal issues, Mae ends up agreeing to wear a SeeChange device herself (called "going transparent"), representing her own growing role in the company, epitomized by a public talk in which she insists, "secrets are lies," "sharing is caring," and "privacy is theft." Mae's job now mainly consists of touring the campus and showing customers future products; any hints of her own doubts about privacy seem dropped, in contrast to her ex-boyfriend Mercer. He dislikes the internet and eventually insists on going off the grid to escape the more and more far-reaching influence of The Circle and its technologies. Kalden calls Mae, warning her that The Circle must be stopped, but she refuses to listen.

Meanwhile, Annie becomes envious of Mae's success and volunteers to be the test subject for PastPerfect, a new product that tracks a person's family history and activities, to regain her standing within the company. Disturbing facts about Annie's family history come to light and she becomes increasingly stressed, eventually causing her to fall into a catatonic state. Embarrassed both by her parents' distrust of SeeChange monitoring in their home and the conduct of her ex, Mercer – all of which have been publicly accessible to Mae's millions of followers – Mae becomes upset and, while demonstrating a program designed to catch fugitives within minutes, uses it to find Mercer. He attempts to escape using his truck, but after drones prevent him from getting away, Mercer seems to make a decision and ends up driving off a bridge in front of the billion people Mae is streaming to. While initially depressed, Mae soon rationalizes Mercer's death with the help of charismatic 'Wise Man' Eamon Bailey, concluding that he was an extremely depressed, asocial human being who refused society's help, comparing his actions to a person committing suicide by jumping out of the window when being visited by a doctor.

Kalden is, in fact, the elusive "Wise Man" Ty Gospodinov, the original inventor and founder who came up with the idea for the company. Mae agrees to meet him in secret and he tells her that a totalitarian regime will soon arise if nothing is done to stop it, equating it to a surveillance society. He explains the need for privacy in the digital age and asks her to help him take down The Circle, saying he cannot do it alone. Mae thinks that he is insane, but pretends to go along with him, but then betrays him by telling the other founders of The Circle what has happened, who ensure that Ty is silenced. The book ends with Mae looking at Annie in a coma at the hospital, wondering when the time will come that The Circle will develop enough technology to read people's thoughts, saying that "the world deserves nothing less and would not wait".

== Themes ==
=== Corporatocracy ===
By the beginning of the novel, The Circle has subsumed Facebook, Google, Twitter and many other social media sites, giving the company greater influence over the general populace than major politicians. This popularity pressures politicians into going 'transparent', a condition which causes them to be recorded at all times, thereby quashing political corruption. Throughout the novel, it is heavily implied that the company plays an active role in framing politicians in opposition to their vision. The company later develops a system of voting called Demoxie, which requires every citizen to publish their vote through a Circle account. According to Kathrin Maurer and Christian F. Rostbøll, this creates a vision of the future in which "the Web not only supplements democratic institutions but becomes the only institution in society — knowing, organizing, and administering everything."

=== Privacy ===
Paraphrasing George Orwell's 1984, The Circle devises three mantras: “Secrets are lies, sharing is caring, privacy is theft.” This philosophy is chiefly communicated by Eamon Bailey, the face of the company. Many of the ideas in the text at first appear to be utopian, such as the wide-scale reduction of crime and corruption through public mass-market hidden webcams called SeeChange. Bailey argues that denying other human beings the right to see every lived moment gives rise to lies, selfishness, corruption and deceit on a mass scale. However, the cameras soon begin to infringe on civil liberties, with even private sex acts or nature visits being recorded. Once Mae goes transparent, she is unable to have authentic conversations with others, who often use her camera as a means of self-promotion. She also finds herself self-policing mundane behaviors, such as eating junk food, taking pharmaceuticals or telling white lies.

== Reception ==
In the weeks before the book's 2013 release in the United States, Kate Losse, a former Facebook employee, accused Eggers of plagiarizing her memoir The Boy Kings and the media of gender bias in favoring Eggers' novel with more literary praise and attention. In a statement released by his publisher, Eggers said that he had not read Losse's book, nor had Losse read The Circle when she made her claims, aside from an excerpt in the New York Times. Eggers clarified that he "didn't want The Circle to seem to be based on any extant companies or upon the experiences of any employees of any extant companies."

Upon the book's summer 2014 release in German, the weekly magazine Der Spiegel's Thomas Andre gave a favorable review: "The Circle is a genre novel, with its simplistic fabrication meant to be obvious. The symbolism is abundantly clear, because it is Eggers' only way of bringing his message to the ear: How do we mean to handle the right to sovereignty of interpretation over one's own life in the future?" On the other hand, German blogger and internet columnist Sascha Lobo called the book a "demonization" of internet companies that offers no actual arguments.

== Film adaptation ==
A film based on the novel, adapted and directed by James Ponsoldt, was released in April 2017. Emma Watson (Mae Holland), Tom Hanks (Bailey), Karen Gillan (Annie), Ellar Coltrane (Mercer) and John Boyega (Kalden) play the lead roles. The film made over $40 million worldwide but it received negative reviews. The film review website, Rotten Tomatoes, gave the adaptation a rating of 16/100. The Rotten Tomatoes site also offers the following quote as a critic consensus: "The Circle assembles an impressive cast, but this digitally driven thriller spins aimlessly in its half-hearted exploration of timely themes."

Some plot points and characters from the book were changed or removed for the film due to a need to narrow down the story so that it fits into a two-hour film. Smaller details such as Annie dressing up Mae's desk at The Circle to look identical to the one from her previous job were eliminated to make the plot come across as more serious. The character of Francis, Mae's love interest, was removed, as was the episode of Annie falling into a coma. The ending's tone was also changed to make Mae appear more sympathetic as opposed to her depiction in the book, where she does not sympathize with anyone who may be impacted by her choices.

== Sequel ==
In 2021 Eggers released The Every, a sequel to The Circle in which the company has acquired an ecommerce giant and renamed itself The Every, with Mae Holland now the CEO. The story follows a new employee at The Every named Delaney Wells.
