= A Hologram for the King (film) =

2016 film directed by Tom Tykwer

- Theatrical release poster
- Directed by: Tom Tykwer
- Screenplay by: Tom Tykwer
- Based on: A Hologram for the King by Dave Eggers
- Produced by: Stefan Arndt; Gary Goetzman; Arcadiy Golubovich; Uwe Schott; Tim O'Hair
- Starring: Tom Hanks; Omar Elba; Sarita Choudhury; Sidse Babett Knudsen; Ben Whishaw; Tom Skerritt
- Cinematography: Frank Griebe
- Edited by: Alexander Berner
- Music by: Johnny Klimek; Tom Tykwer
- Production companies: Playtone; X-Filme Creative Pool; Primeridian Entertainment; Silver Reel
- Distributed by: Lionsgate; Roadside Attractions; Saban Films (United States); X-Verleih (through Warner Bros.; Germany); Cinépolis Distribución (Mexico)
- Release dates: April 20, 2016 (Tribeca Film Festival); April 22, 2016 (United States)
- Running time: 97 minutes
- Countries: France; Germany; Cayman Islands; Mexico; United States
- Language: English
- Budget: $35 million
- Box office: $11.8 million

A Hologram for the King is a 2016 comedy-drama film written, directed and co-scored by Tom Tykwer, based on the 2012 novel of the same name written by Dave Eggers, and starring Tom Hanks as a washed-up corporate salesman, who goes to Saudi Arabia to propose a business deal.

Sidse Babett Knudsen, Tom Skerritt and Sarita Choudhury also star in this international co-production between France, Germany, the Cayman Islands, Mexico, and the United States. The film was released on April 22, 2016, by Lionsgate, Roadside Attractions and Saban Films.

== Plot ==
American salesman Alan Clay is sent to sell a holographic teleconferencing system to the Saudi government by overseeing a presentation for the King of Saudi Arabia. Clay was offered the job solely because he once met a nephew of the King. Clay is haunted by a previous job at the Schwinn Bicycle Company, where he oversaw the outsourcing of their production to China, which led to hundreds of layoffs in the US. He is also depressed by a messy and costly divorce, which leaves him unable to afford to send his daughter to college.

Oversleeping on his first day in Jeddah, due to jet lag, he misses the shuttle bus to the King's Metropolis of Economy and Trade, a largely unfinished planned city in the desert, where Clay is scheduled to give his sales presentation. He hires a driver, Yousef, who describes being in love with a woman whose wealthy and jealous husband has led Yousef to fear for his life. After arriving, Clay is informed that neither the King nor his direct contact, Karim Al-Ahmed, are there. Clay's team is placed in a tent outside the office building, which lacks food and workable internet access.

Clay repeatedly oversleeps and calls Yousef repeatedly to drive him to the development. They become closer during the long drives. At the development, he is repeatedly put off and confined to the tent. One day, he slips inside the building and meets Danish executive Hanne. She is sympathetic to his plight, but cannot help him get in contact with the King or Karim Al-Ahmed. She offers him alcohol disguised as olive oil, which Clay has missed since arriving in Saudi Arabia.

That night, Clay gets drunk and tries to cut open a lump on his back. Waking the next day, covered with blood from the cut, he goes to a hospital, where he develops an immediate connection with Zahra, the doctor treating him. She performs a biopsy and asks him to return in a few days. After more days without progress, Clay is invited by Hanne to a party at the Danish consulate, where she unsuccessfully tries to seduce him. The next day, after the tent's air conditioning breaks, Clay becomes upset. He again slips into the office building and finally meets Karim Al-Ahmed. Karim assures Clay he will take care of the team's problems but cannot give him a date for the presentation. He shows Clay a new, totally empty condominium development.

Back in Jeddah, Clay has a panic attack at his hotel. Mistaking it for a stroke, he calls Zahra and Yousef. Yousef, arriving shortly after Zahra, notices how close they are and after she leaves, chastises Alan for endangering her by making advances, which Clay vehemently denies. Yousef confesses the jealous husband has threatened him and flees to his home town in the mountains for the weekend to let things cool down. Clay accompanies him, passing through Mecca, a city prohibited to non-Muslims.

After returning, Clay learns his lump contains precancerous cells and should be removed the next day. When returning to the development, Clay notices the technical problems have been resolved, and successfully gives the King his presentation. However, soon after, Clay learns the Saudis have made a deal with a Chinese company, which can offer a similar product at a cheaper rate.

The next day, the operation begins with an unknown male doctor, but at the last moment, Zahra takes over, to Clay's delight. After the procedure, Clay and Zahra exchange increasingly personal and intimate emails, which culminate in a secret meeting. They talk about their families, and Zahra explains she has children and is going through a messy divorce. They are driven to Zahra's beach house, where they go swimming and have sex. Clay writes to his daughter, telling her the deal was unsuccessful but that he has taken a well-paid job selling condominiums in the unfinished city, which will allow him to pay for college for her, and has found a new positive force in his life with Zahra.

== Cast ==
- Tom Hanks as Alan Clay
- Omar Elba as Yousef (credited as Alexander Black)
- Sarita Choudhury as Zahra Hakem
- Sidse Babett Knudsen as Hanne
- David Menkin as Brad
- Megan Mackzko as Rachel
- Christy Meyer as Cayley
- Tracey Fairaway as Kitty Clay
- Eric Meyers as Eric Randall
- Jane Perry as Ruby
- Khalid Laith as Karim Al-Ahmad
- Amira El Sayed as Maha
- Abdullah Al Muslemani
- Jay Abdo as Dr. Haddad
- Waleed Elgadi as Sayed
- Dhaffer L'Abidine as Hasan
- Zaydun Khalaf as Mohammed
- Ben Whishaw as Dave
- Tom Skerritt as Ron

== Production ==
=== Development ===
On June 12, 2013, Tom Tykwer was reported to be developing an adaptation of 2012 novel A Hologram for the King, written by Dave Eggers. Tykwer wrote and directed the film, which stars Tom Hanks as the lead. The film was made by Playtone, Primeridian Entertainment, and X-Filme Creative Pool. On September 5, 2013, Lotus Entertainment began licensing international rights to the film. On March 6, 2014, it was announced that Sarita Choudhury, Alexander Black, Tracey Fairaway, David Menkin, and Tom Skerritt had joined the cast of the film.

=== Filming ===
Production was set to begin in first quarter of 2014. Principal photography commenced on March 6, 2014, in Morocco. Filming also took place in Hurghada in Egypt, as well as in Berlin and Düsseldorf in Germany. Shooting wrapped in June 2014.

== Reception ==
=== Critical response ===
Writing for The New York Times, Stephen Holden called the movie "a story of confusion, perplexity, frustration and panic," praising Tom Hanks's ability to turn it into "an agreeably uncomfortable comedy," meriting a "Critic's Pick" designation. On Rotten Tomatoes, the film has a rating of 70% based on 150 reviews and an average rating of 6.20/10. The site's critical consensus reads, "A Hologram for the King amiably ambles through a narrative desert, saved by an oasis of a performance from the ever-dependable Tom Hanks." On Metacritic, the film has a score of 58 out of 100 based on 35 critics, indicating "mixed or average" reviews.

=== Box office ===
Released alongside The Huntsman: Winter's War and Elvis & Nixon on April 26, 2016. A Hologram for the King made $1.1 million in its opening weekend, finishing 11th at the box office. With a total worldwide gross of $8,244,651 (U.S. domestic gross of $4,212,494), it is the lowest-grossing film to feature Tom Hanks in top billing since Every Time We Say Goodbye in 1986.
