= Contrapposto (novel) =

2026 novel by Dave Eggers

- Author: Dave Eggers
- Publisher: Alfred A. Knopf
- Publication date: June 6, 2026
- Pages: 432
- ISBN: 9780593803509

Contrapposto is a 2026 novel by Dave Eggers published by Alfred A. Knopf. Announced in November 2025, it was released on June 9, 2026. It is considered one of the most anticipated books of 2026 by People, Literary Hub, Oprah Daily, and others.

== Background ==
According to Knopf, the novel was twenty years in the making and follows Eggers' own experiences attending art school and working as a classically trained artist.

== Critical reception ==
Library Journal called Contrapposto "A tender, searching novel" and likened it sentimentally to Normal People by Sally Rooney.
The Guardian called the novel "disappointingly pious", saying "this portrait of an artist falls flat."
