= The Parade (novel) =

Book by Dave Eggers

- Author: Dave Eggers
- Publication date: March 1, 2019
- ISBN: 978-0-241-39449-6

The Parade is a 2019 novel by American writer Dave Eggers. Set in an unnamed nation emerging from civil war, the book follows two foreign contractors, known only as Four and Nine, tasked with paving a road in time for a celebratory parade that is meant to symbolise national unity.

Critics described the short, parable‑like story as "an unassuming but deceptively complex morality play" and "a heartbreaking work of staggering cynicism." Eggers has said the idea arose after witnessing foreign road crews in South Sudan in 2006.

== Plot ==
The story follows two foreign company men known only by their company-assigned numbers: Four, a disciplined and protocol-driven operator of a high-tech paving machine, and Nine, his unpredictable and hedonistic assistant. They are working in an unnamed country that recently experiecned a civil war between the rural South and the developed North. Their mission is to complete a road that will unite the North and South and bring prosperity to the country, but their different approaches complicate the task.

As they progress northward, the contrast between the two men becomes increasingly stark. Four prides himself in following company policy, avoiding all contact with locals and focusing solely on the road. Nine, by contrast, is continuously and recklessly distracted by the different pleasures offered by the locals and their culture. Their differing approaches to the mission and to the people they encounter create escalating tensions and a series of moral and logistical crises that challenges their initial mind frames.

Nine's long absences become more frequent until one day he disappears altogether. Four is told by a local that Nine is severely ill and near death. Four helps Nine, with the assistance of friendly locals, breaking protocol in the process. The villagers nurse Nine back to health, while in the meantime Four begins interacting with the locals more than ever before, seeing glimpses of the culture and people he's been told to ignore.

After completing the road, the duo is welcomed at the capital and given accommodations at an upscale hotel. Nine opts to stay for the parade that was planned to celebrate the connection of the Northern and Southern parts of the country. Four decides to go home immediately to his family.

As he leaves the capital on a private jet, Four sees a parade of villagers from the South heading up the new road. They are met by an army of soldiers and tanks from the North, who begin opening fire on the helpless civilians.

== Critical reception ==
Reviews of The Parade were divided over its stylistic restraint and moral clarity. In The Guardian, Benjamin Evans praised Eggers's style by describing the novel as "a smartly engineered machine" but criticized its allegorical dimension for failing to offer "answers for a world on the brink." Carl Wilkinson of the Financial Times criticized Eggers's more austere tone in comparison with his previous work, calling the novel "a conventional blend of liberal guilt and pessimism". Stuart Kelly of The Scotsman praised the novel's activism and its ability to provoke ethical reflection in obscuring the almost parodic behind parable by employing "chilling little moments" and "sentimentality." In the Times Literary Supplement, Sophie Dess emphasized the ambiguity and "eerie tension" in the novel's "memorable little scenes", arguing that it transcends simple allegory to become a "complex and satisfying novel."

Academic responses have focused on the novel's engagement with the ethics of attention in the digital age. The scholar Miriam Fernández-Santiago situates The Parade within broader debates about the economy of attention, arguing that it challenges readers to oscillate between aesthetic appreciation and ethical reflection.
