= Art + Water =

Non profit organization based in California

Art + Water is a tuition-free, not-for-profit art school in San Francisco, California. It was founded in 2026 by Dave Eggers and artist JD Beltran. The concept for the school was driven by the dual desire to maintain San Francisco as a vital hub for the arts and to re-imagine how to offer an arts education more affordably.

After initial delays, the school is expected to welcome its first cohort of twenty students in January 2027. Applications for residencies closed on June 1, 2026 and were open to emerging artists living in the greater Bay Area, including San Francisco, Alameda, Contra Costa, Marin, San Mateo, Santa Clara, and Solano counties. An initial group of ten more established artists will serve as faculty and receive free studio space in exchange for teaching a set number of hours per week. Co-founder and artist JD Beltran is included amongst the teaching faculty; co-founder Dave Eggers is not.

The school will be located on the waterfront in San Francisco at Pier 29, a space with over 100,000 square feet. It is expected to house a large exhibition hall as well as galleries and artist studios. Once open, it will become San Francisco’s largest combined studio and exhibition space.
