= The Every =

2021 novel by Dave Eggers

- Book cover of The Every
- Author: Dave Eggers
- Cover artist: Eve Weinsheimer and Jessica Hische
- Language: English
- Genre: Science fiction
- Publisher: Vintage
- Publication date: October 5, 2021 (hardcover), November 16, 2021 (paperback)
- Publication place: United States
- Media type: Print (hardcover & paperback), audiobook, e-book
- Pages: 608 pp. (first edition, paperback)
- ISBN: 978-0-593-31534-7 (first edition, paperback)
- Preceded by: The Captain and the Glory

The Every is a 2021 dystopian novel written by American author Dave Eggers. The novel is a sequel to Eggers's 2013 novel The Circle. It tells the story of a woman named Delaney Wells who joins The Every, a company formed by a merger between The Circle and an e-commerce giant known as "the jungle" (a thinly-disguised version of Amazon). Wells feels the company is too powerful, and she joins with the intent of destroying it from the inside.

== Plot summary ==
Delaney Wells, a former forest ranger from Idaho, interviews at The Every, a software company headquartered on Treasure Island in San Francisco Bay. Although she does not have a solid plan, her goal is to destroy the company from within. As part of her interview, she enlists her friend and housemate Wes Makazian to create a prototype for an application that can determine whether a person you are talking to is telling the truth.

Delaney is hired, and the company sets about productizing the idea she presented during her interview. This also results in Wes Makazian being hired as a developer at The Every. As part of her initial time at the company, Delaney is rotated among different teams. During each of these rotations, she proposes ideas, brainstormed by Wes and her, that are meant to be so invasive and offensive to the public that they would damage the reputation of The Every once they are released. However, to her surprise and dismay, the public well-received each idea. Wes's stature at The Every continues to grow, and he tells Delaney that he is no longer interested in working against the company. During this time, she receives increasingly distressed letters from her college professor, Meena Agarwal, an anti-monopolist who strongly opposes The Every and is upset that Delaney is working there.

One of the employees Delaney meets is Gabriel Chu, who eventually subjects her to a private interrogation to determine why she is at The Every. He uses the truth-detector application that grew out of Delaney's interview prototype. Delaney realizes that she has been unable to hide her true intent from Gabriel. However, he later tells her that he is part of an organized resistance within The Every, with goals similar to Delaney's.

Delaney eventually is invited to meet with Mae Holland, the CEO of The Every (and the protagonist of The Circle). After the meeting, Mae proposes that they go hiking alone in Idaho. Delaney detours to Oregon to visit Professor Agarwal and is shocked to learn that she has accepted a job at The Every. Delaney and Mae meet for a hike to a cliff with a view of a waterfall. On the way up, Delaney proposes her most radical idea yet, which involves rolling all of the metrics that The Every is currently privately gathering about people into a single, public score that evaluates a person's total value. At the top of the falls, it is revealed that Mae is aware of Delaney's plans, in coordination with Gabriel Chu, and that the resistance is fake. Mae, who has intentionally turned off all tracking of the hike and has been wearing weighted men's boots on the hike to throw off any investigation, pushes Delaney off the cliff.

The book ends with Mae preparing to present her idea for a radical new application to an audience at The Every.

== Themes ==
The novel continues in the same vein as The Circle, expanding on the notion that privacy is being dramatically weakened. However, as described in Shoshana Zuboff's The Age of Surveillance Capitalism, most people are willing to accept that as a tradeoff for convenience. It also includes themes from Barry Schwartz's book The Paradox of Choice, that people are happier when they have fewer choices.

== Release ==
Consistent with the novel's plot, Eggers dislikes Amazon's role as a bookseller. As a result, he did not allow the hardcover version of the novel to be sold on Amazon; It was sold only through independent booksellers, and was made available 6 weeks before the paperback and e-book became available on Amazon. The hardcover had 32 different covers, all showing the same image but with various color schemes. Eggers stated in an interview with Vanity Fair, "If you are taking away a big chunk of the way a lot of people buy books, you're saying that to get this one, you might have to make a tiny bit more effort outside of the Buy Now button online. And I know that we're exhausted as a species; there's just too much going on, and it's not like we can always avoid aiding and abetting these monopolies—especially during a pandemic. But maybe it'll drive a few people to look around the corner and see that there's a little store there that might benefit from a purchase or two."

== Television series ==
In April 2022, it was reported that HBO is developing a television series adaptation of the novel, with Rachel Axler writing and executive producing; Eggers and David Miner will also executive produce.

== Reception ==
A November 2021 review in The Guardian called Eggers "a wonderful storyteller with an alert and defiant vision", and, comparing the book to The Circle, described it as "longer and baggier, but still fuelled by rage at the power of Silicon Valley and its numbing effect on the human race".

The New York Times described the book as "[moving] relentlessly from one mocking sendup of tech culture to the next" but also stated "for a defense of nuance and unpredictability, 'The Every' exhibits a startling lack of both" and complains "Very little is left to interpretation...I wished, often, to be allowed to come to my own conclusions, exercise my own subjectivity — that same endangered faculty the novel mourns...For a long novel, the story is strikingly static, its message so unchanging that a plot never really develops."
