= Anna Mae Pallanck =

American politician (died 2013)

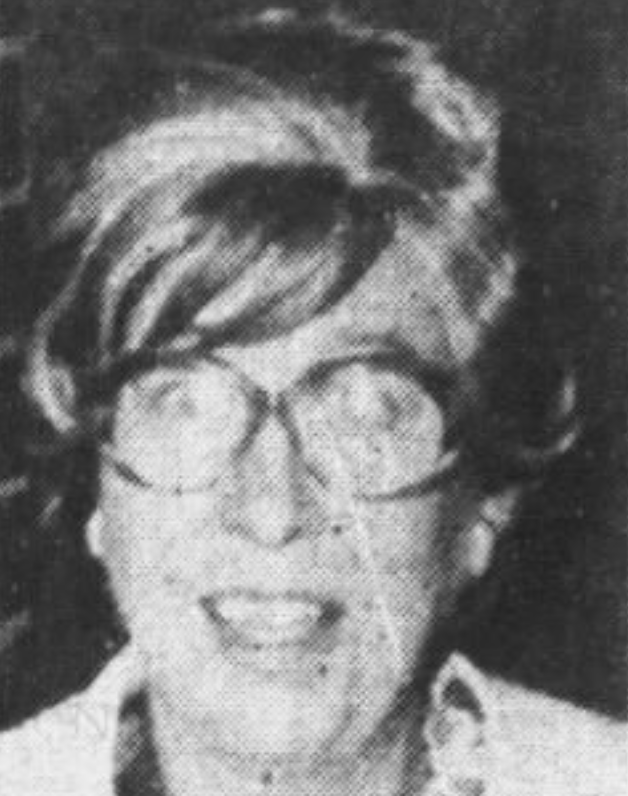

Member of the Connecticut House of Representatives from Union
- In office 1953–1959 Serving with Basil A. Plusnin
- Preceded by: John S. Yoskovich; Lemuel F. Howlett
- Succeeded by: Burton L. Sweet; Ida B. Brown

Personal details
- Born: Anna Mae Goodhall; 1922 or 1923 Stafford Springs, Connecticut, U.S.
- Died: June 19, 2013 (aged 90) Southbridge, Massachusetts, U.S.
- Party: Republican
- Spouse: Ermen J. Pallanck

Anna Mae Pallanck (died June 19, 2013) was an American politician who served in the Connecticut House of Representatives from 1953 to 1959, representing the town of Union as a Republican.

== Personal life ==
Pallanck was born in Stafford Springs, Connecticut, to parents Ruth and Wallace I. Goodhall Sr. She was married to fellow politician Ermen J. Pallanck, who would serve in the Connecticut House of Representatives in the 1960s, and later as a U.S. marshal. Together, the couple owned Marion's Restaurant, located on the Wilbur Cross Highway, which they operated between 1956 and 1957. The Pallancks closed the restaurant in September 1957 and sold it in January 1963.

Pallanck died on June 19, 2013, at Harrington Memorial Hospital in Southbridge, Massachusetts. She was 90.

== Political career ==
=== Connecticut House of Representatives ===
A Republican, Pallanck was first elected to the Connecticut House of Representatives in 1952 as one of two representatives from Union. She served three terms alongside fellow Republican Basil A. Plusnin and did not run for reelection in 1958. She was succeeded by fellow Republicans Burton L. Sweet and Ida B. Brown.

=== Later career ===
Following her service in the Connecticut House of Representatives, Pallanck remained active in politics in Union. From 1957 to 1963, she was vice chairman of the town committee. In 1963 and 1964, Pallanck was an unsuccessful candidate for the Republican State Central Committee's 35th district, both years defeated by candidate Virginia C. Lewis. In 1966, she was named to the town planning and zoning commission to fulfill her husband's unexpired term after his resignation.

Pallanck served as first selectwoman of Union from 1974 to 1981, the first woman to hold the position. She chose not to run for reelection at the end of her final term, citing the town's decision not to raise the salary from $4,000. She was critical of her successor, state trooper James Johnston. Pallanck had previously complained to the State Board of Labor Relations about Johnston's candidacy, claiming that state law permitted state employees to campaign for election, but did not permit simultaneously holding public office and working for the state. The board dismissed her complaint without a hearing.

== Legal issues ==
Pallanck was involved in a dispute with the Connecticut Highway Department between 1957 and 1959. On July 22, 1957, Pallanck was arrested and charged with aggravated assault after firing multiple shots with a .22 caliber rifle at a group of Highway Department employees erecting a fence on what she claimed was her property. Pallanck stated that she had only intended to scare the workers and that the fence cut across her driveway, preventing direct access to the highway. Her counsel argued that the workers were "invading her land", while the state contended that Pallanck had already been provided land to build a new driveway that connected to another road with highway access in November 1956, and that she had been given until June 1957 to construct the new driveway, during which time the Highway Department had delayed its work.

In September 1957, the Pallancks closed their business, Marion's Restaurant, with Anna Mae citing the Highway Department's recent removal of her highway sign as the cause of a sharp decline in business. She claimed she had a permit for the sign and that it had been removed without notice, an issue presented during her trial as evidence that the superintendent of the Highway Department, who testified against her, had been "hostile" towards her. Her counsel claimed the superintendent had initially rejected Pallanck's request for a sign permit, which the commissioner's office later granted. It was then claimed that the superintendent subsequently ordered the sign removed "on orders from the commissioner's office".

Pallanck was convicted of aggravated assault in December 1957 and sentenced on December 17. She was given a suspended sentence of ten days in jail and ordered to pay a fine of $300. She appealed her case to the Connecticut Supreme Court, but her conviction was ultimately upheld in 1959.
