= Mae West (disambiguation) =

Mae West (1893–1980) was an American actress, playwright, and screenwriter.

Mae West may also refer to:

== Arts and media ==
- Mae West (film), a 1982 telefilm
- Mae West (sculpture), a sculpture in Munich
- Lady May or Mae West, American rapper
- Debi Mae West (born 1963), American voice actor

== Technology ==
- Mae West (life preserver)
- MAE-West, a defunct Internet exchange point in California, United States
- M2A2 tank or Mae West, a pre–World War II M2 light tank variant

== See also ==
- Mae West Lips Sofa, a 1937 a surrealist sofa by Salvador Dalí
- May West, dessert cake
