= The Wild Things =

Book by Dave Eggers

- First edition (furry)
- Author: Dave Eggers
- Published: 2009 (McSweeney)
- Publication date: October 13, 2009
- Pages: Hardcover (300 pages)
- ISBN: 1934781630

The Wild Things is a 2009 full-length novel written by Dave Eggers and published by McSweeney's. The book is based on the screenplay of Where the Wild Things Are which Eggers co-wrote. The film is, in turn, based on Maurice Sendak's children's book Where the Wild Things Are.

== Development ==
According to the Acknowledgements of the novel, Eggers, who was asked by Spike Jonze to write the screenplay, was also asked by Sendak to write the novelization. He said his version is different, as Sendak's Max was based on Sendak, Jonze's was based on Jonze, and while writing the book, Eggers incorporated parts of his own boyhood into the character.

== Awards ==
- International Dublin Literary Award longlist (2011)
