= How We Are Hungry =

Book by Dave Eggers

- Author: Dave Eggers
- Language: English
- Genre: Psychological fiction, American fiction
- Published: 2004
- Publisher: McSweeney's
- Media type: Print
- ISBN: 1-932416-13-7 (hardcover first edition)
- OCLC: 812881098

How We Are Hungry is a collection of short stories by Dave Eggers, originally published by McSweeney's in 2004. The hardcover first edition includes the following pieces:

== Stories ==
- "Another"
- "What It Means When a Crowd in a Faraway Nation Takes a Soldier Representing Your Own Nation, Shoots Him, Drags Him from His Vehicle and Then Mutilates Him in the Dust," originally published in The Guardian
- "The Only Meaning of the Oil-wet Water," originally published in Zoetrope All-Story
- "On Wanting to Have Three Walls up Before She Gets Home," originally published in The Guardian
- "Climbing to the Window, Pretending to Dance," originally published in The New Yorker in a slightly different form as "Measuring the Jump"
- "She Waits, Seething, Blooming," originally published in The Guardian
- "Quiet"
- "Your Mother and I," originally published in h2s04
- "Naveed," originally published in The Guardian
- "Notes for a Story of a Man Who Will Not Die Alone," originally published in another form in Ninth Letter
- "About the Man Who Began Flying After Meeting Her," originally published in The Guardian
- "Up the Mountain Coming Down Slowly," originally published in McSweeney's #10
- "There Are Some Things He Should Keep to Himself"
- "When They Learned to Yelp"
- "After I Was Thrown in the River and Before I Drowned," originally published in Speaking with the Angel

== Publication details ==
"There Are Some Things He Should Keep to Himself," which consists solely of five blank pages, is not included in the paperback edition.
