= A Heartbreaking Work of Staggering Genius =

2000 memoir by Dave Eggers

- First edition
- Author: Dave Eggers
- Cover artist: Komar and Melamid
- Language: English
- Genre: Memoir
- Publisher: Simon & Schuster
- Publication date: 2000
- Publication place: United States
- Media type: Print (paperback)
- Pages: 375
- ISBN: 0-684-86347-2
- OCLC: 42667954
- LC Class: CT275.E37 A3 2000

A Heartbreaking Work of Staggering Genius is a memoir by Dave Eggers. Published in 2000, it chronicles his stewardship of his younger brother Christopher "Toph" Eggers following the cancer-related deaths of his parents.

The book was a commercial and critical success, reaching number one on The New York Times bestseller list and being nominated as a finalist for the Pulitzer Prize for General Nonfiction. Time magazine and several newspapers dubbed it "The Best Book of the Year". Critics praised the book for its wild, vibrant prose, and it was described as "big, daring [and] manic-depressive" by The New York Times. The book was chosen as the 12th-best book of the decade by The Times.

== Important characters ==
- Heidi McSweeney Eggers – Eggers's mother, a woman who has to deal with raising her children while suffering from stomach cancer. She dies in January 1992, relatively early in the book.
- John K. Eggers – Eggers's father was a heavy smoker and drinker. When he was a child, Eggers remembers his father as an angry drunk, often chasing after his children, trying to catch them so that he could spank them. Like Eggers's mother, his father has a minor role in the book, as he died November 1991, prior to Eggers's mother.
- William D. Eggers – Eggers's oldest brother. He lives in Los Angeles, and is not mentioned much in the book.
- Elizabeth Anne "Beth" Eggers – Eggers's sister. Beth took care of her dying mother and helped Eggers raise Toph, their younger brother, after their parents died.
- Christopher M. "Toph" or "Topher" Eggers – Eggers's younger brother, whom he must finish rearing after his parents' deaths and his older siblings are unable.
- Shalini – In one part of the book Shalini falls from a building patio and must stay in the hospital until she has recovered from her coma. Eggers visits her often in the hospital. When not visiting her, Eggers goes to the pub to drink and 'check out' girls.
- Sari Locker – A sexologist, with whom Eggers fantasizes about having sex.
- Marny Requa – After Eggers creates a magazine titled Might, he becomes good friends with Marny, a girl with whom he works. He sometimes imagines having sex with her, but Marny always gets Eggers's mind off sex and back on focus with the magazine.
- Kirsten – Eggers and Kirsten remain friends after their relationship is over. Kirsten and Beth help Eggers rear Toph, even after Kirsten and Beth move two hours away from Eggers and Toph.
- John – A friend of Eggers’ who often reaches out to him during crisis moments in his struggles with drugs and alcohol, often leading to Eggers intervening and sending him to rehab.

== Themes ==
The book's primary story is Eggers's learning to be both brother and parent to Toph. It starts out with Eggers, Toph, and Beth dealing with their mother and father's stomach and lung cancer illnesses, respectively. After their parents' deaths, Eggers, Toph, and Beth's lives become complicated. The three children move from Illinois to California.

Beth lives on her own at first, and Toph becomes Eggers's responsibility. Eggers, a man in his early 20s, has to raise a child as if he were his own. Eggers's life can no longer involve things many 20-year-olds would like to do. For example, Eggers cannot stay out of the house all night at the bar and bring home a different girl every week, something which he talks about wanting to do in his book in detail.

With the help of an inheritance and Social Security, Eggers and Toph rent apartments in neighborhoods where Toph can go to private schools and Eggers can work on his magazine venture. Eggers is occasionally self-conscious about the cleanliness of their various homes and worries that other people will mistakenly find him unfit to parent Toph, but counterbalances these images with recollections of including Toph in fun activities (frisbee, for example) and cooking, laundering, and driving for Toph.

Eggers talks thoroughly about how much he loves and cares for Toph. Eggers says he would kill or severely hurt anyone who hurts Toph. In addition, all the times Eggers leaves Toph at home with a babysitter, Eggers is constantly wondering whether or not Toph is okay.

== Summary ==
In Lake Forest, Illinois, Dave Eggers and his siblings, Bill, Beth and Toph (who is 13 years younger than his next-eldest sibling, Dave) endure the sudden death of their father due to lung cancer. Their mother dies a month later from stomach cancer after a long struggle.

Afterwards, Eggers, Beth and Toph move to California. Bill, who does not play a large role in the plot, eventually moves to Los Angeles. The rest of the family live in the San Francisco Bay Area.

Eggers and Toph begin living on their own in a dilapidated, untamed fashion. Eggers struggles between moments of feeling that his approach to parenting is calculated and brilliantly designed to make Toph well-adjusted, to worrying that his hands-off approach and commitment to personal projects will make Toph maladjusted. Eggers's own attempts to lead a normal life as a young adult often involve fairly ordinary encounters with women and alcohol, but are depicted by the author as somewhat surreal. Due to his parents' death and his duty to take care of Toph, he feels robbed of his youth, and this fuels his pursuit of sex and irresponsibility.

Eggers and his friends organize an independent magazine called Might in San Francisco and become engrossed in the Generation X subculture. Much of the magazine's history is portrayed in the book. Eggers also auditions for MTV's The Real World in a development on the theme of exhibitionism.

== Real-life aspects ==
A Heartbreaking Work of Staggering Genius is usually classified as a memoir or autobiography, although it includes tangential fantasy scenes. Eggers occasionally "compresses" time, making events in the book closer in time to one another than they actually were to enhance the flow of the story.

Eggers sometimes has characters lapse into breaking the fourth wall by acknowledging their existence within the book at several points when talking to him. In these cases, the characters often abandon their typical real-life personalities and characteristics, becoming tools with which Eggers can express and analyze his own thoughts and feelings in an "internal" dialogue, or vehicles for self-criticism.

Eggers points out which parts of the book were fictionalized or exaggerated in the course of the book and the preface. One critic has noted that the very title of Eggers’ memoir invites a discussion of how the reader is to engage with the book. In this view, the title, as a so-called "allographic paratext", is seen as an invitation for the reader not to "dismiss the emotionally tinged style as bathos" but rather accept "the premise that this book, in part, is a textualized trauma" and thus the reader is "called upon to be sympathetic to the emotional sincerity found in the book."

== Preface and addenda ==
The book includes lengthy preface and acknowledgement sections, a list of tips to help better enjoy the book (including several tips not to bother reading large sections of the book), and a guide to its symbols and metaphors.

Later printings of the book also include an addendum called Mistakes We Knew We Were Making, which details some of the deliberate omissions and composite events that made the book flow more easily.

== Film adaptation ==
In 2000, New Line Cinema bought the rights to adapt the book into a film. The screenplay was written by novelist Nick Hornby and screenwriter D.V. DeVincentis. Paul Thomas Anderson had met with Hornby to discuss directing and Lasse Hallström also expessed interest. Scott Rudin boarded as producer in 2002. In a 2007 interview, Eggers told Entertainment Weekly that a film version was unlikely to be seen, saying that the studio's option on the film had run out.

== Sources ==
- Altes, Liesbeth Korthals (2008) "Sincerity, Reliability, and Other Ironies — Notes on Dave Eggers’ A Heartbreaking Work of Staggering Genius" in Narrative Unreliability in the Twentieth-Century First-Person Novel (eds. Elke D’hoker and Gunther Martens). Berlin: Walter de Gruyter.
- Funk, Wolfgang (2011) "The Quest for Authenticity – Dave Eggers’ A Heartbreaking Work of Staggering Genius between Fiction and Reality" in The Metareferential Turn in Contemporary Arts and Media: Forms, Functions, and Attempts at Explanation (ed. Werner Wolf). Amsterdam: Rodopi.
- Hamilton, Caroline (2010) One Man Zeitgeist: Dave Eggers, Publishing and Publicity. London: Continuum.
- Jensen, Mikkel (2014) "A Note on a Title: A Heartbreaking Work of Staggering Genius" in The Explicator. Volume 72, Issue 2.
- Nicol, Bran (2006) "'The Memoir as Self-Destruction': Dave Eggers’s A Heartbreaking Work of Staggering Genius" in Modern Confessional Writing (ed. Jo Gill). New York: Routledge.
