= Kathrin Maurer =

Danish-German Professor

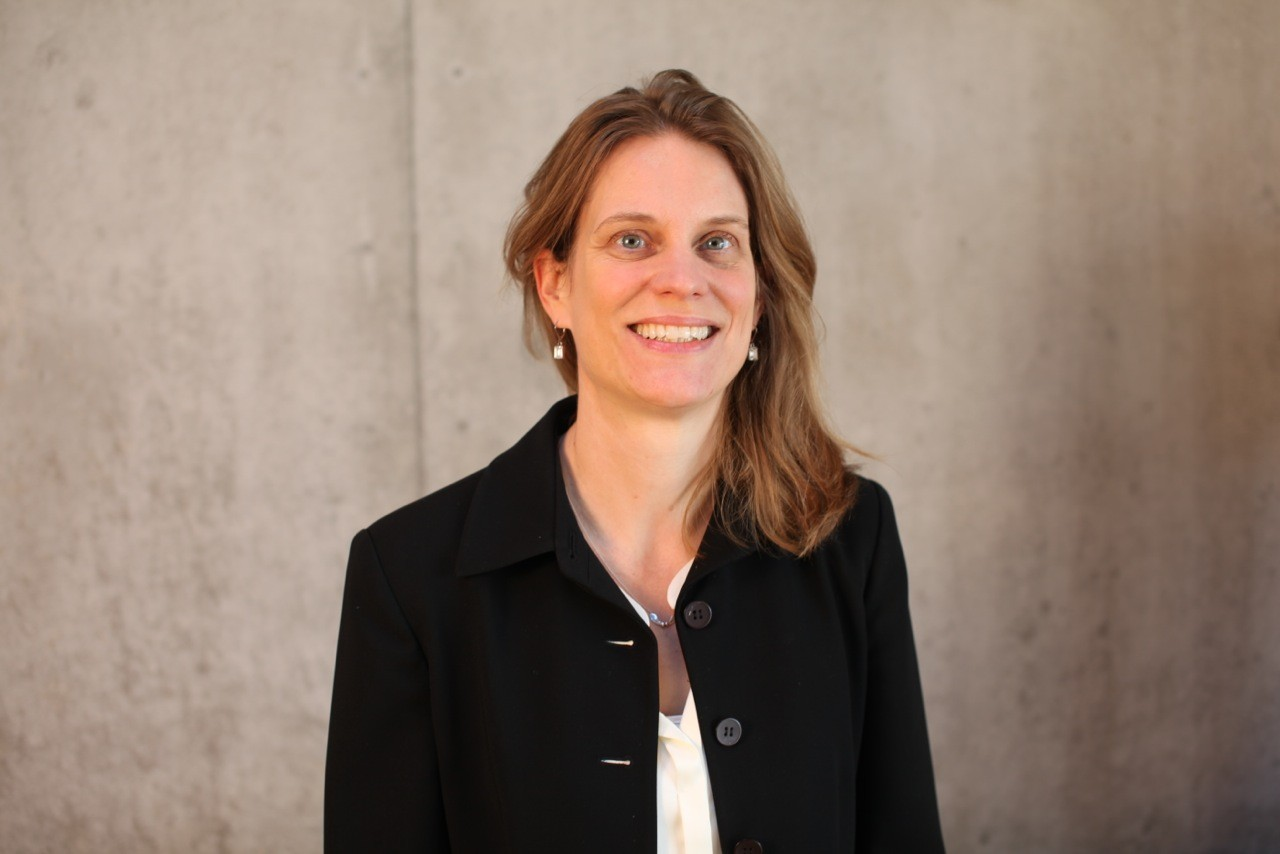

Academic background
- Education: Columbia University
- Thesis: Representing history : literary realism and historicist prose in nineteenth-century Germany (2002)

Kathrin Maurer is professor for culture and technology at the University of Southern Denmark. She is known for her research on surveillance technology, drones, discourses of war, and visual culture. She has also published work on nineteenth-century visual culture in Germany.

== Education and career ==
Maurer attended Droste-Hülshoff-Gymnasium Freiburg and finished her BA in German studies and philosophy at Albert-Ludwigs-Universität in Freiburg 1994. She received her PhD in German studies from Columbia University in New York in 2002 and her Dr. Phil. Habil. in German studies from University of Southern Denmark in 2015.

She served as an assistant professor in German studies at the University of Arizona from 2002 to 2007. She also was employed as an assistant professor at the University of Southern Denmark from 2008 to 2012 before she became an associate professor from 2012 to 2020. Since 2020 she has been professor of culture and technology at the University of Southern Denmark.

== Selected publications ==
- Maurer, Kathrin (2006). Discursive Interaction. Heidelberg: Synchron. ISBN 978-3-935025-87-4.
- Maurer, Kathrin (2010). "Communication and Language in Niklas Luhmann's Systems-Theory". Pandaemonium Germanicum (16): 1–21. doi:10.1590/S1982-88372010000200002. ISSN 1414-1906.
- Maurer, Kathrin (2013-03-22). Visualizing the Past: The Power of the Image in German Historicism. Walter de Gruyter. ISBN 978-3-11-028293-1.
- Maurer, Kathrin (2017). "Visual power: The scopic regime of military drone operations". Media, War & Conflict. 10 (2): 141–151. doi:10.1177/1750635216636137. ISSN 1750-6352.
- Maurer, Kathrin (2020). Drone Imaginaries: The Power of Remote Vision. Manchester: Synchron. ISBN 978-1-526145-93-2.
- Maurer, Kathrin (2021). "The Sensorial Experience of the Drone. Theme issue The Senses and Society". doi:10.1080/17458927.2020.1820195. ISSN 1745-8927.
- Maurer, Kathrin (2022). "Automatizing Visuality". The Journal of Media Art Study and Theory. 3 (1). doi:10.59547/26911566. ISSN 2691-1566.
- Maurer, Kathrin (2023). "Machinic Visions of the Planetary. Theme Issue Media and Environment". Media+Environment. 5 (1). doi:10.1525/001c.88425. ISSN 2640-9747.
- Maurer, Kathrin (2023). The Sensorium of the Drone and Communities. Cambridge, Massachusetts: MIT Press. ISBN 9780262374903.
