= William D. Eggers =

American writer and policy analyst

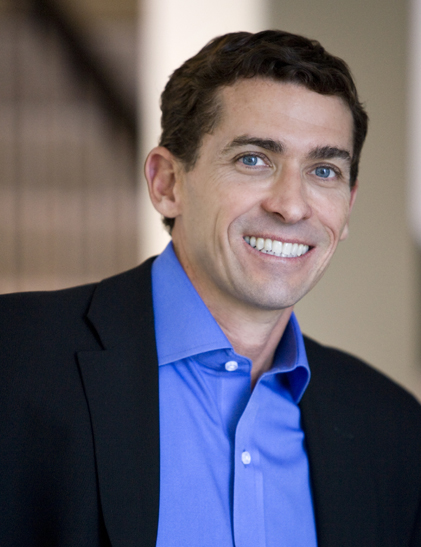
- Eggers in June 2009
- Born: February 14, 1967 (age 58); New York City, U.S.
- Other names: Bill Eggers
- Education: University of California, San Diego
- Occupation(s): Writer, researcher, policy analyst, government consultant, management consultant
- Known for: Business, federal government policy
- Relatives: Dave Eggers (brother)
- Awards: Fellow of the National Academy of Public Administration (2006); Louis Brownlow Award (2005); APEX Award for excellence in business journalism (2002); Roe Award(1996); Sir Anthony Fisher Award (1996)

William Daniel Eggers (born February 14, 1967) is an American writer, researcher, policy analyst, and government and management consultant. Eggers has worked in government reform for more than two decades.

== Early life and education ==
Eggers was born in 1967 in New York City, and grew up in Lake Forest, Illinois, a suburb of Chicago. He is the brother of author Dave Eggers. He attended the University of California, San Diego.

== Career ==
He is a former appointee to the Office of Management and Budget's Performance Measurement Advisory Commission and the former Project Director for the Texas Performance Review and e-Texas initiative. He also served as a Commissioner for the Texas Incentive and Productivity Commission and a designee on the Texas Council on Competitive Government.

He was a former senior fellow at the Manhattan Institute for Policy Research, a conservative think tank, and the former director of government reform at Reason Foundation, a libertarian think tank.

Eggers is currently the Director of the Public Sector Research Group at Deloitte, where he is responsible for research.

== Books ==
- Revolution at the Roots: Making our Government Smaller, Better and Closer to Home (with John O'Leary). The Free Press, 1995. ISBN 0-02-874027-0
- Governing by Network: The New Shape of the Public Sector (with Stephen Goldsmith). Brookings Institution Press, 2004. ISBN 978-0-8157-3129-0
- Government 2.0: Using Technology to Improve Education, Cut Red Tape, Reduce Gridlock and Enhance Democracy. Rowman and Littlefield, 2005. ISBN 978-0-7425-4176-4
- States of Transition: Tackling Government's Toughest Policy and Management Challenges (with Robert Campbell). Deloitte Research, 2006. ISBN 978-0-9790611-0-3
- If We Can Put a Man on the Moon: Getting Big Things Done in Government, Harvard Business Press, 2009. ISBN 978-1-4221-6636-9
- Public Innovator's Playbook: Nurturing Bold Ideas in Government (with Shalabh Singh). Deloitte Research, 2009. ISBN 978-0-9790611-1-0
- Pay for Success (with Paul Macmillan). Ethos Journal, December 2013
- The Solution Revolution: How Business, Government, and Social Enterprises Are Teaming Up to Solve Society's Toughest Problems (with Paul Macmillan). Harvard Business Review Press, 2013. ISBN 978-1422192191
- Delivering on Digital: The Innovators and Technologies That Are Transforming Government. Deloitte University Press and Rosetta Books, 2016. ISBN 978-0795347511
