= Doyald Young =

American typeface designer

- Born: September 12, 1926; Holliday, Texas
- Died: February 28, 2011 (aged 84); Sherman Oaks, California
- Education: Art Center College of Design, Pasadena, California
- Occupation: Typeface designer
- Known for: Logotypes and Script Typefaces, including Young Baroque
- Title: Doctor of Humane Letters
- Website: doyaldyoung.com

Doyald Young (September 12, 1926 – February 28, 2011) was an American typeface designer and teacher who specialized in the design of logotypes, corporate alphabets, lettering and typefaces.

== Work ==
The typefaces designed by Doyald Young include Young Baroque, ITC Éclat, Home Run, and the formal script Young Gallant.

Commissions for logotypes and trademarks include the industrial design firm of Henry Dreyfuss Associates, California Institute of Technology, University of California at Los Angeles, exhibition catalogs for UCLA’s Clark Memorial Library, The Music Center of Los Angeles County, Mattel Toys, Max Factor, Vidal Sassoon and Prudential Insurance. With Don Bartels, designed the font for General Electric Company’s corporate identity program. His life story and working method is profiled in the Lynda.com "Creative Inspirations" video Doyald Young: Logotype Designer.

His entertainment credits include: Liza Minnelli and Frank Sinatra specials, Disney’s 30th Anniversary Celebration, Harry Connick Jr., k.d. lang, Bette Midler, Prince, The Grand Reopening of Carnegie Hall, The Grammy Awards, The Annual Academy of Country Music Awards, The Golden Globe Awards, and The Tony Awards, and most recently, the Art Directors Guild logo.

In later years, he was working on another book, tentatively titled Learning Curves, which was left unfinished with his passing.

== Teaching ==
Young was a teacher at Art Center College of Design, where he taught lettering, logo design, and typographic basics from 1955 to 1978, and again from 1998 until his death in 2011.

== Honors ==
His book Fonts and Logos was awarded a Silver Medal by the Western Art Directors Club, November 2000. In 2001 Art Center College of Design named him Inaugural Master of the School for teaching and his contribution to the field of art and design. In 2009 AIGA awarded him the prestigious AIGA Medal for his contributions to the field of graphic design. On December 18, 2010 Art Center College of Design bestowed on him an honorary Doctorate of Humane Letters.

== Death ==
Young died on February 28, 2011, following complications from cardiac surgery.

== Bibliography ==
- Young, Doyald (1993), Logotypes & Letterforms : handlettered logotypes and typographic considerations, Design Press, ISBN 978-0-8306-3956-4, OCLC 25051268
- Young, Doyald (1999), Fonts & Logos: font analysis, logotype design, typography, type comparison, and history, Delphi Press, ISBN 978-0-9673316-0-7
- Young, Doyald (2003), 40 Mills Place: a collection of type specimens, Archetype Press, Art Center College of Design
- Young, Doyald (2008), Dangerous Curves: Mastering Logotype Design, Delphi Publishers, ISBN 978-0-9673316-2-1

== See also ==
- List of AIGA medalists
- List of type designers
