= Dave Eggers =

American writer, editor, and publisher (born 1970)

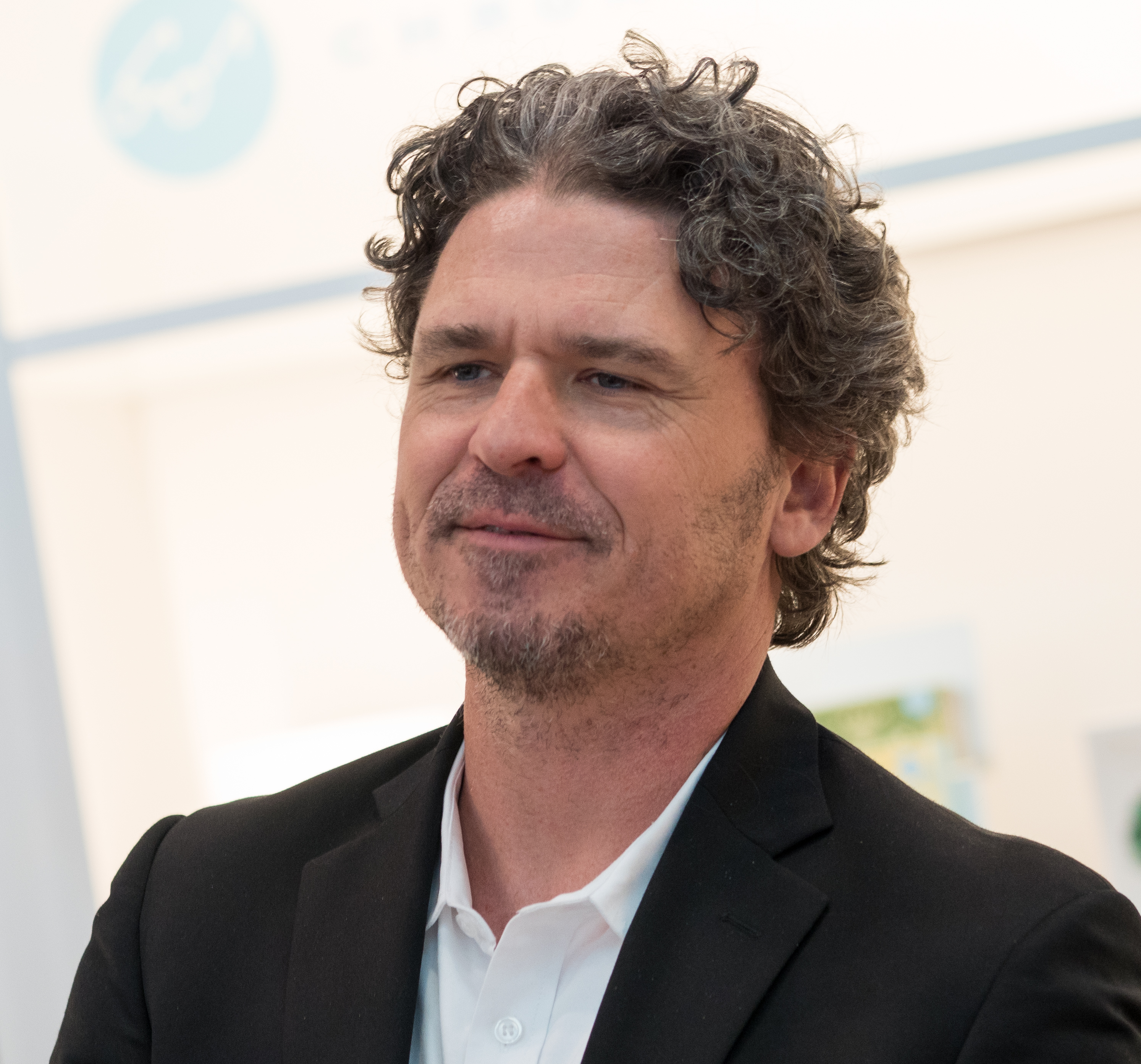
- Eggers in 2018
- Born: March 12, 1970 (age 56); Boston, Massachusetts, U.S.
- Education: University of Illinois at Urbana–Champaign
- Occupations: Writer; editor; publisher; philanthropist
- Spouse: Vendela Vida (m. 2003)
- Children: 2
- Relatives: William D. Eggers (brother); Constance Demby (aunt)
- Writing career
- Period: 1993–present
- Notable works: A Heartbreaking Work of Staggering Genius; You Shall Know Our Velocity; What Is the What; Zeitoun; A Hologram for the King; The Circle
- Movements: Postmodern literature, post-postmodern, new sincerity
- Website: www.mcsweeneys.net www.daveeggers.net

Dave Eggers (born March 12, 1970) is an American writer, editor, and publisher. As an author, he has written fiction, non-fiction, and children's books. His 2000 memoir, A Heartbreaking Work of Staggering Genius, became a bestseller and was a finalist for the Pulitzer Prize for General Nonfiction.

Eggers is also the founder of several literary and philanthropic ventures, including the literary journal Timothy McSweeney's Quarterly Concern, the literacy project 826 Valencia, and the human rights non-profit organisation Voice of Witness.

Additionally, he founded ScholarMatch, a program that connects donors with students needing funds for college tuition.

His writing has appeared in publications including The New Yorker, Esquire, and The New York Times Magazine.

== Early life ==
Eggers was born in Boston, Massachusetts, and raised in a family with three siblings. His father, John K. Eggers (1936–1991), was an attorney, and his mother, Heidi McSweeney Eggers (1940–1992), was a schoolteacher. The family moved to Lake Forest, Illinois, where Eggers attended public high school and was a classmate of actor Vince Vaughn.

Eggers attended the University of Illinois at Urbana–Champaign, pursuing a degree in journalism. At age 21, following the deaths of both his parents from cancer, only 32 days apart, Eggers became the guardian of his younger brother, Christopher ("Toph"), and moved to the San Francisco Bay Area, where their elder sister Beth was attending law school. Eggers' fictionalized memoir A Heartbreaking Work of Staggering Genius was based on these events. His elder brother, William D. Eggers, is a researcher who has worked for several conservative think tanks, promoting privatization. Beth Eggers died by suicide in November 2001.

== Career ==
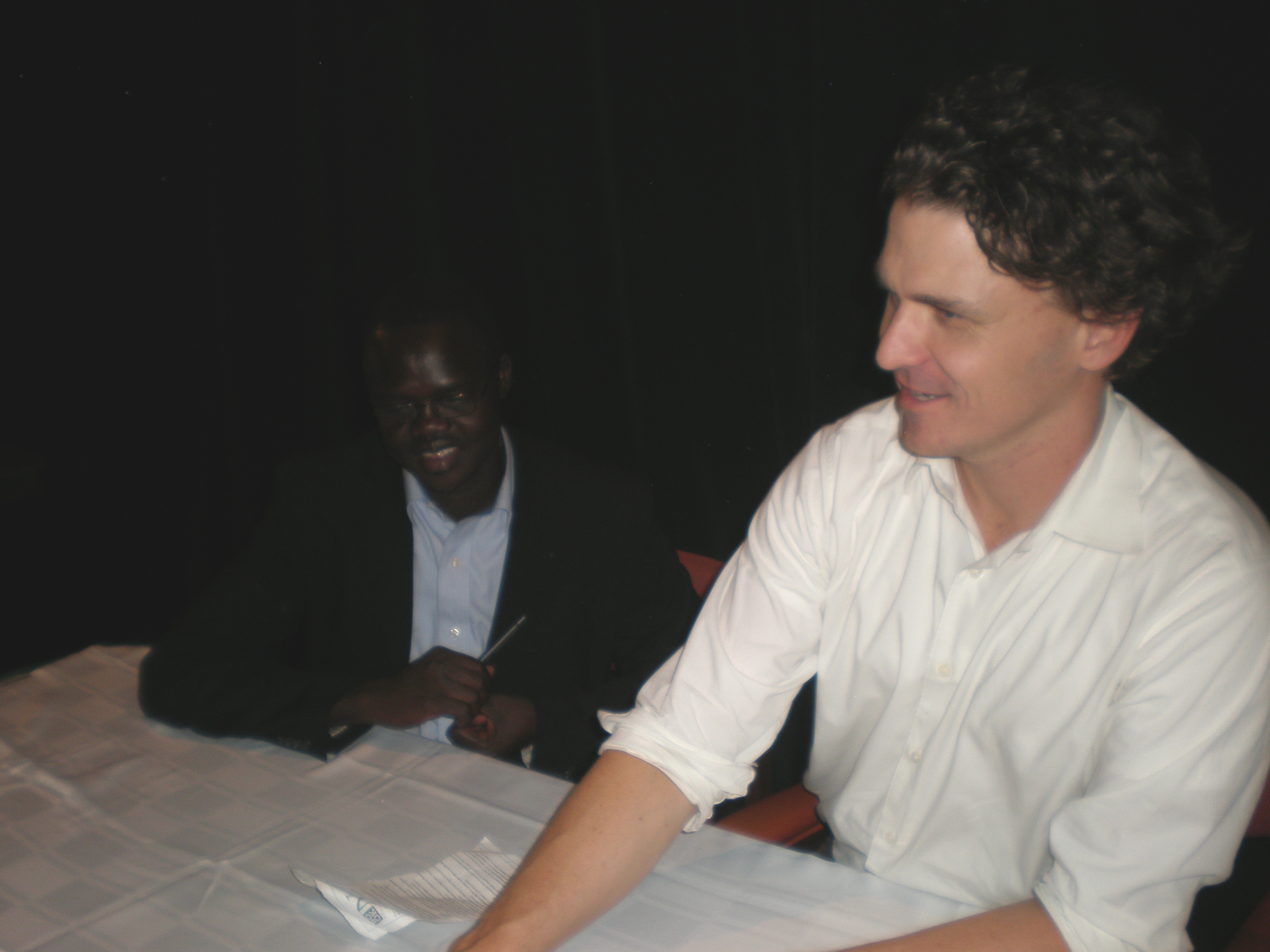
Eggers worked with Sudan refugee Valentino Achak Deng to tell a fictionalized account of Achak's life story.

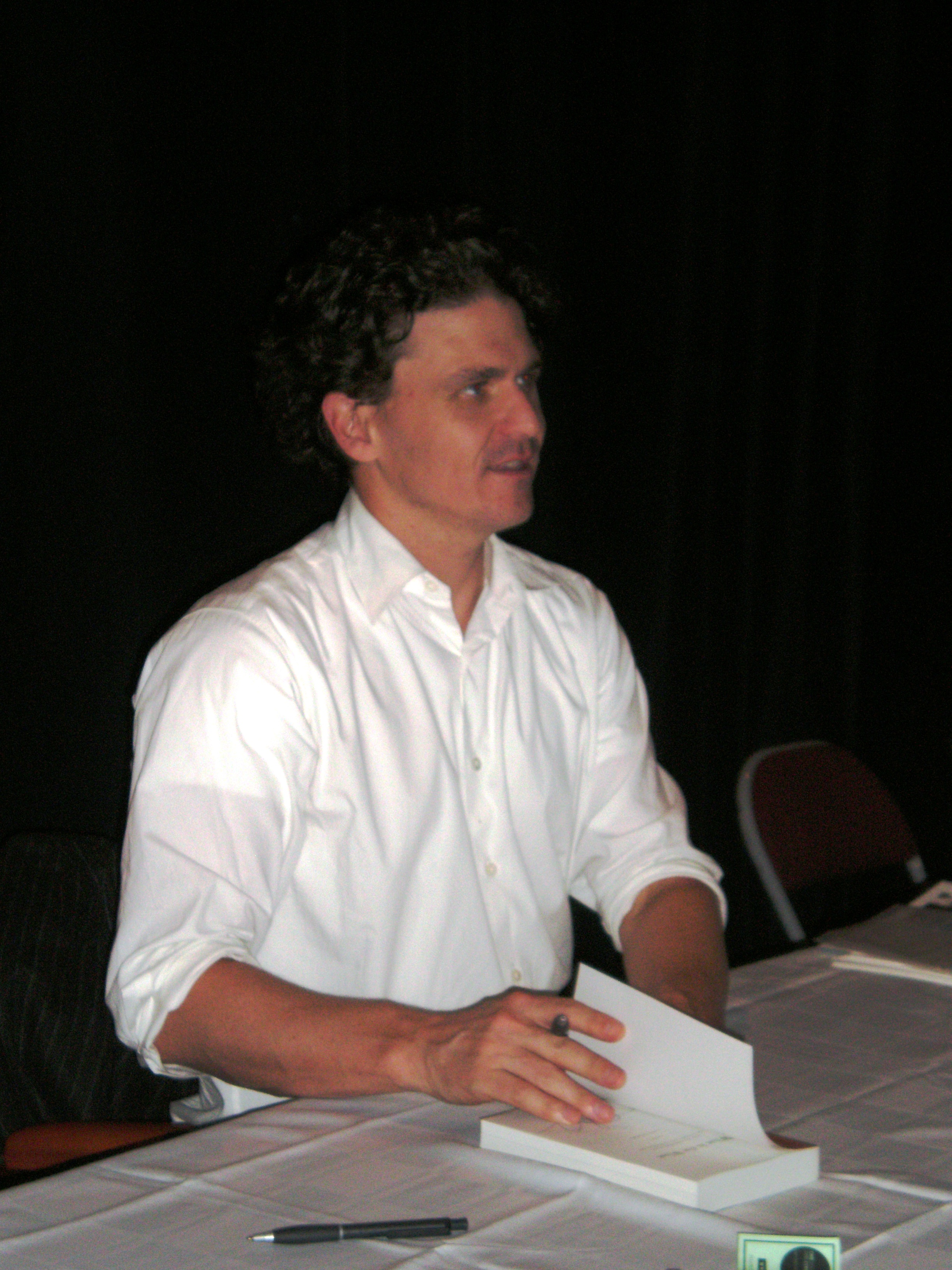
Eggers in October 2008

Eggers began writing as a Salon.com editor and founded Might magazine in San Francisco in 1994 with David Moodie and Marny Requa, while also writing a comic strip called Smarter Feller (originally Swell) for SF Weekly.

Might evolved out of the small San Francisco-based independent paper Cups, and gathered a loyal following with its irreverent humor and quirky approach to the issues and personalities of the day. An article purporting to be an obituary of former 1980s child star Adam Rich (originally intended to be Back to the Future star Crispin Glover until Glover backed out) garnered some national attention. The magazine regularly included humor pieces, and several essays and nonfiction pieces by seminal writers of the 1990s, including "Impediments to Passion", an essay on sex in the AIDS era by David Foster Wallace.

Eggers later recounted in his memoir A Heartbreaking Work of Staggering Genius that the magazine struggled to profit and stopped publication in 1997. An anthology of the best of Might magazine's brief run, 'Shiny Adidas Tracksuits and the Death of Camp' and Other Essays from Might Magazine, was published in late 1998. By this time, Eggers was freelancing for Esquire and continuing to work for Salon.

A Heartbreaking Work of Staggering Genius, published in 2000, is Eggers's first book, a memoir with fictional elements, and it focuses on his struggle to raise his younger brother in the San Francisco Bay Area following the deaths of both of their parents. The book quickly became a bestseller and was a finalist for the Pulitzer Prize for General Nonfiction. The memoir was praised for its originality, idiosyncratic self-referencing, and several innovative stylistic elements. Early printings of the 2001 trade-paperback edition were published with a lengthy postscript entitled, Mistakes We Knew We Were Making.

In 2002, Eggers published his second novel, You Shall Know Our Velocity, a story about a frustrating attempt to give away money to deserving people while haphazardly traveling the globe. An expanded and revised version was released as Sacrament in 2003. A version without the new material in Sacrament was created and retitled You Shall Know Our Velocity! for a Vintage imprint distribution. He has since published How We Are Hungry, a collection of short stories, and three politically themed serials for Salon.

In November 2005, Eggers published Surviving Justice: America's Wrongfully Convicted and Exonerated, a book of interviews with former prisoners sentenced to death and later exonerated. The book was compiled with Lola Vollen, a specialist in the aftermath of prominent human rights abuses and a visiting scholar at the University of California, Berkeley's Institute of International Studies.

Eggers' 2006 novel What Is the What: The Autobiography of Valentino Achak Deng was a finalist for the 2006 National Book Critics Circle Award for Fiction. Eggers also edits the Best American Nonrequired Reading series, an annual anthology of short stories, essays, journalism, satire, and alternative comics.

Eggers was one of the original contributors to ESPN The Magazine and helped create its section "The Jump". He also acted as the first anonymous "Answer Guy", a column that continued to run after he stopped working for the publication.

On November 7, 2009, he was presented with the "Courage in Media" Award by the Council on American–Islamic Relations for his book Zeitoun. Zeitoun was optioned by Jonathan Demme, who considered an animated film-rendition of the work. To Demme, it "felt like the first in-depth immersion I'd ever had through literature or film into the Muslim-American family. ... The moral was that they are like people of any other faith, and I hope our film, if we can get it made, will also be like that." Demme, quoted in early 2011, expressed confidence that when the script was finished, he would be able to find financing, perhaps even from a major studio. However, in May 2014, The Playlist reported that the film was "percolat[ing] in development". Demme died in April 2017, and the project has not been heard of since.

In the early 2010s, after six years without publishing substantive literary fiction following What is the What, Eggers began a three-year streak of back-to-back novels, each broadly concerned with pressing social and political issues facing the United States and the world in the twenty-first century. Eggers published his novel of the Great Recession and the 2008 financial crisis, A Hologram for the King, in July 2012. In October of that year, the novel was announced as a finalist for the National Book Award.

Eggers followed this with The Circle, which was released in October 2013. The novel tells the story of a young employee at a fictional technology company based in San Francisco. As she navigates her job, she begins to doubt her career when despite the company's seemingly benevolent innovations, a more sinister underlying agenda is ultimately revealed. Critics said the fictional company seemed to be a blend of Facebook, Google and other social media outlets.

Your Fathers, Where Are They? And the Prophets, Do They Live Forever? was published in June 2014. In November 2015, the book was longlisted for the 2016 International Dublin Literary Award, Eggers's fifth nomination for the award following earlier nominations for The Circle, A Hologram for the King, The Wild Things, and What is the What.

In April 2016, Eggers visited Israel as part of a project by Breaking the Silence to write an article for a book on the Israeli occupation and the 50th anniversary of the Six-Day War. The book was edited by Michael Chabon and Ayelet Waldman and published under the title Kingdom of Olives and Ash: Writers Confront the Occupation in June 2017.

In July 2016, Eggers published Heroes of the Frontier. Earlier the same year, a film adaptation of Eggers's earlier novel A Hologram for the King was released to mixed reviews and middling commercial performance. The Circle, a film version of Eggers's book, starring Emma Watson, John Boyega, and Tom Hanks (who had starred in the Hologram for the King adaptation), was released in April 2017. Eggers followed Heroes of the Frontier with The Monk of Mokha (2018), another nonfiction biography in a similar vein to Zeitoun, billed by the publishers as "the exhilarating true story of a young Yemeni American man, raised in San Francisco, who dreams of resurrecting the ancient art of Yemeni coffee but finds himself trapped in Sana'a by civil war."

Eggers ended the decade by publishing two stylistically different novellas written concurrently. The Parade, published by Knopf in March 2019, was a spare, minimalist novella reflecting Eggers's long-standing concerns with humanitarian issues, global development, and Western perceptions of the developing world. According to the advance blurb from the publisher, the novel concerns "two men, Western contractors sent to work far from home, tasked with paving a road to the capital in a dangerous and largely lawless country." Reviews were mixed: Positive notices included Andrew Motion's writing in The Guardian that "[Eggers'] novel may be sternly reduced in terms of its cast and language, but this leanness doesn't diminish the strength of its argument", and Ron Charles in The Washington Post wrote that The Parade is "a story that conforms to the West's reductive attitudes about the developing world. Writers and politicians have long generalized about those individual cultures. A novel that lumps them together into a nameless, primitive nation only plays into that tendency."

The Parade was followed in November 2019 by another short novella, The Captain and the Glory, billed by Eggers himself as an "allegorical satire" of the Trump administration. In an interview with the publishers Knopf published on the McSweeney's website, Eggers described the novel as "an attempt to understand this era by painting it in the gaudy and garish colors it really deserves... This is part farce, part parable, and I do hope, though the Captain bears more than a passing resemblance to Trump, that the book will be readable when Trump is gone. That's part of the reason I called it 'An entertainment' on the title page. It's a nod to Graham Greene but also the way I hope people will read it. It was cathartic to write, and I hope cathartic to read." As with The Parade, reviews were decidedly mixed, with much criticism noting that Eggers's satire struggled to keep up with or do justice to the events of the Trump era. In a review for the Financial Times, Carl Wilkinson expressed bemusement about the purpose of the book and its intentions, Hannah Barekat in The Spectator was critical of the "heavy handed" nature of the book's satire, and The Guardian, The Times Literary Supplement, and Kirkus Reviews also found the book wanting.

In 2021, his novella The Museum of Rain was published, and according to the McSweeney's website, the "elegiac" short story concerns "an American Army vet in his 70s who is asked to lead a group of young grand-nieces and grand-nephews on a walk through the hills of California's Central Coast. Walking toward a setting sun, their destination is The Museum of Rain, which may or may not still exist, and whose origin and meaning are elusive to all." The Museum of Rain was the first in a series of novellas that Eggers has published since 2021 under the banner 'The Forgetters', billed as a "grand experiment in serialized publishing" that "will someday be a probably-overlong novel" Entries in the 'Forgetters' series published since 2021 to-date are The Honor of Your Presence (November 2023); Keeper of the Ornaments, The Comebacker and Where The Candles are Kept (October 2024); Sanrevelle (August 2025); The Ocean is Everyone's But Not Yours (October 2025); and Uncle Patrick's Secessionist Breakfast (December 2025).

The novel The Every was released in October 2021 as a follow-up to his 2013 novel The Circle.

Contrapposto, a novel about art and a 60-year friendship, was published in June 2026. New York Times reviewer Alexandra Jacobs called it "a romance of epic and goopy proportions" that also explores "the meaning of art and the unfairness, pretensions and occasional skulduggery of the art world."

=== McSweeney's and other ventures ===
Eggers is the founder of McSweeney's, an independent publishing house known for its literary journal Timothy McSweeney's Quarterly Concern, which he began in 1998. McSweeney's also publishes The Believer, a monthly journal edited by Eggers's wife, Vendela Vida, and the now-defunct DVD magazine Wholphin.

In addition to his literary pursuits, Eggers is a philanthropist. In 2002, he and educator Nínive Clements Calegari co-founded 826 Valencia, a nonprofit writing and tutoring center for children and young adults. The project has since expanded into a national organization, 826 National, with chapters in cities across the United States (Los Angeles, New York City, Chicago, Ann Arbor, Washington, Boston, New Orleans and Minneapolis–Saint Paul). In April 2010, under the umbrella of 826 National, Eggers launched ScholarMatch, a nonprofit organization that connects donors with students to make college more affordable.

In 2006, he appeared at fundraising events, dubbed the Revenge of the Book–Eaters tour, to support these programs.

In September 2007, the Heinz Family Foundation awarded Eggers a $250,000 Heinz Award (given to recognize "extraordinary achievements by individuals") in the Arts and Humanities. In accordance with Eggers's wishes, the award money was given to 826 National and The Teacher Salary Project.

=== Visual arts ===
While at the University of Illinois, Urbana-Champaign, Eggers attended art classes. After the publication of A Heartbreaking Work of Staggering Genius, he focused mainly on writing. Still, he publicly returned to visual art in 2010, with a solo gallery show at Electric Works in San Francisco, called "It Is Right to Draw Their Fur". The show featured many drawings of animals often paired with phrases, sometimes out of the Bible. In conjunction with that exhibition, McSweeney's published a catalog featuring 25 loose-leaf prints of the work featured in the show. In 2015, Eggers had his first solo museum exhibition at the Nevada Museum of Art called "The Insufferable Throne of God". Eggers is represented by Electric Works, a fine art gallery in San Francisco.

Outside of exhibitions, Eggers' visual art contributions include the following:

- Provided album art for Austin rock group Paul Banks & the Carousels' album Yelling at the Sun.
- Designed the artwork for Thrice's album Vheissu.

=== Art+Water ===
In May 2026, shortly before he released Contrapposto, Eggers announced the formation of a new tuition-free art school in San Francisco called Art + Water via his blog on McSweeney's. The school will offer free studio space to ten artists who serve as faculty to the inaugural class of 20 emerging artists, slated to begin in January 2027 following delays in the initial proposed timeline. Eggers co-founded Art + Water with artist JD Beltran. The school will be located at Pier 29 on the waterfront in San Francisco, and feature a large exhibition space, galleries and a store along with artist studios.

=== Other ===
Ahead of the 2006 FIFA World Cup, Eggers wrote an essay about the U.S. national team and soccer in the United States for The Thinking Fan's Guide to the World Cup, which contained essays about each competing team in the tournament and was published with aid from the journal Granta. According to The San Francisco Chronicle, Eggers was rumored to be a possible candidate to be the new editor of The Paris Review before the Review selected Lorin Stein.

== Activism ==
Eggers's book The Every was released in 2021, but he refused to sell the hardcover edition on Amazon, limiting the release to independent bookstores only. Since its release, paperback editions of The Every have been available on Amazon.

In 2022, Eggers's books were among several titles banned in South Dakota schools because of sexual content. Eggers went to South Dakota to speak to authorities and students and offered any student who wanted one of the banned books a copy for free via his website.

In December 2022, Eggers traveled on behalf of PEN America to Kyiv, Ukraine. He published "The Profound Defiance of Daily Life in Kyiv" in The New Yorker based on his time in the war-torn country.

In May 2025, Eggers published a short story entitled Uncle Patrick's Secessionist Breakfast calling on California to secede from the USA and become an independent country. Eggers contends in the story that the new California wouldn't need a military to defend itself as Russia would never attack a member of NATO and China would never attack a Western nation.

== Personal life ==
Eggers lives in the San Francisco Bay Area with his wife, Vendela Vida, who is also a writer. The two met at a wedding in San Francisco in 1998 and married in 2003. They have two children together. Eggers was the primary guardian of his youngest brother, Toph, with whom he co-authored children's books.

== Awards and recognition ==
Eggers has won numerous annual awards for specific works as well as lifetime achievement awards. A Heartbreaking Work of Staggering Genius was among the Time Best Books for 2000 and was an Editors' Choice at The New York Times Book Review. It won the Addison Metcalf Award in 2001. What Is the What: The Autobiography of Valentino Achak Deng won the Salon Book Award in 2006. Zeitoun received the PEN Center USA Award of Honor in 2012. A German version of Zeitoun, with German translators Ulrike Wasel and Klaus Timmermann, won the Albatros Literaturpreis in 2012. The Eyes and the Impossible won the Newbery Medal in 2024.

Eggers himself received an honorary degree from Brown University in 2005. In 2007 he won the Heinz Award (Arts and Humanities), and in 2009, the Innovator's Award of the Los Angeles Times Book Prize. In 2015 he was inducted into the American Academy of Arts and Letters.

== Works ==
=== Fiction ===
==== Novels ====
- Mistakes We Knew We Were Making. Vintage Books. 2001. ISBN 9780375725784.
- You Shall Know Our Velocity. Vintage Books. 2002. ISBN 9780970335555.
- Sacrament. Vintage Books. 2003. ISBN 9781932416008.
- The Unforbidden Is Compulsory; or, Optimism. McSweeney's. 2004. ISBN 9781932416107.
- What Is the What: The Autobiography of Valentino Achak Deng. McSweeney's. 2006. ISBN 9781932416640.
- The Wild Things. McSweeney's. 2009. ISBN 9781934781616.
- A Hologram for the King. McSweeney's Books. 2012. ISBN 9781936365746.
- The Circle. Alfred A. Knopf. 2013. ISBN 9780385351393.
- Your Fathers, Where Are They? And the Prophets, Do They Live Forever?. Alfred A. Knopf, McSweeney's. 2014. ISBN 9781101874196.
- Heroes of the Frontier. Alfred A. Knopf. 2016. ISBN 9780451493804.
- The Parade. Alfred A. Knopf. 2019. ISBN 9780525655305.
- The Captain and the Glory. Alfred A. Knopf. 2019. ISBN 9780525659082.
- The Every. Vintage Books. 2021. ISBN 9780593315347.
- Contrapposto. Alfred A. Knopf. 2026. ISBN 9780593803509.

==== Short stories ====
===== Collections =====
- How We Are Hungry. McSweeney's Books. 2004. ISBN 9781932416138.
- Short Short Stories (Pocket Penguins series). Penguin. 2005. ISBN 9780141023083.
- How the water feels to the fishes. A part of One Hundred and Forty-Five Stories in a Small Box. McSweeneys Books. 2007. ISBN 9781932416824.

====== The Forgetters series ======
- The Museum of Rain. McSweeney's. 2021. ISBN 9781952119354.
- The Honor of Your Presence. McSweeney's. 2023. ISBN 9781952119903.
- The Keeper of the Ornaments. McSweeney's. 2024. ISBN 9781963270006.
- The Comebacker. McSweeney's. 2024. ISBN 9781963270013.
- Where the Candles Are Kept. McSweeney's. 2024. ISBN 9781963270037.
- The Ocean Is Everyone's But It Is Not Yours. McSweeney's. 2025. ISBN 9781963270020.
- Sanrevelle. McSweeney's. 2025. ISBN 9781963270419.
- Uncle Patrick's Secessionist Breakfast. McSweeney's. 2025. ISBN 9781963270433.
- The Minister of Color and Light. McSweeney's. 2026. ISBN 1963270428.

==== Children's fiction ====
- Hello Children. McSweeney's. 2006. ISBN 9781932416329.
- When Marlana Pulled a Thread. McSweeney's. 2011. ISBN 9781936365425.
- The story of Captain Nemo. Save the Story. Illustrated by Fabian Negrin. Created by Jules Verne. Pushkin Children's Books. 2013. ISBN 9781782690184.
- The Bridge Will Not Be Gray. Illustrated by Tucker Nichols. McSweeney's. 2015. ISBN 9781940450476.
- Her Right Foot. Illustrated by Shawn Harris. Chronicle Books. 2017. ISBN 9781452162812.
- The Lifters. Illustrated by Aaron Renier. Alfred A. Knopf. 2018. ISBN 9781524764166.
- What Can a Citizen Do?. Illustrated by Shawn Harris. Chronicle Books. 2018. ISBN 9781452173139.
- Abner & Ian Get Right-Side Up. Illustrated by Laura Park. Little, Brown and Company. 2019. ISBN 9780316485869.
- Most of the Better Natural Things in the World. Illustrated by Angel Chang. Chronicle Books. 2019. ISBN 9781452162829.
- Tomorrow Most Likely. Illustrated by Lane Smith. Chronicle Books. 2019. ISBN 9781452172781.
- Faraway Things. Illustrated by Kelly Murphy. Little, Brown and Company. 2021. ISBN 9780316492195.
- We Became Jaguars. Illustrated by Woodrow White. Chronicle Books. 2021. ISBN 9781452183930.
- The Eyes and the Impossible. Illustrated by Shawn Harris. Alfred A. Knopf. 2023. ISBN 9781524764203.
- Moving the Millers' Minnie Moore Mine Mansion. Illustrated by Júlia Sardà. Candlewick Press. 2023. ISBN 9781536215885.
- Soren's Seventh Song. Illustrated by Mark Hoffmann. Cameron Kids. 2024. ISBN 9781951836733.
- The Eyes, the Fire & the Avalanche Kingdom. Illustrated by Shawn Harris. Alfred A. Knopf. 2026. ISBN 9798217028566.

===== The Haggis-on-Whey World of Unbelievable Brilliance series =====
Eggers and his brother, Christopher, authored this series using the joint pseudonym Benny and Doris Haggis-on-Whey.

- Giraffes? Giraffes!. Simon & Schuster. 2003. ISBN 9780743267267.
- Your Disgusting Head. Simon & Schuster. 2004. ISBN 9780743267250.
- Animals of the Ocean: In particular the Giant Squid. McSweeney's. 2006. ISBN 9781932416398.
- Cold fusion : colder than ever before; better than hot fusion or even fission. McSweeneys. 2008. ISBN 9781934781210.
- Children and the Tundra. McSweeney's. 2014. ISBN 9781940450049.

=== Nonfiction ===
- A Heartbreaking Work of Staggering Genius. Simon & Schuster. 2000. ISBN 9780684863474.
- Teachers have it easy : the big sacrifices and small salaries of America's teachers. Written with Daniel Moulthrop and Nínive Clements Calegari. New Press. 2005. ISBN 9781565849556.
- Zeitoun. McSweeney's. 2009. ISBN 9781934781630.
- It Is Right to Draw Their Fur: Animal Renderings. McSweeney's. 2010. ISBN 9781934781982.
- Visitants. McSweeneys. 2013. ISBN 9781938073243.
- Ungrateful Mammals. Contributions by Natasha Boas. Abrams Books. 2017. ISBN 9781419724633.
- The Monk of Mokha. Alfred A. Knopf. 2018. ISBN 9781101947319.

=== Photobooks ===
- Understanding the Sky. McSweeney's. 2016. ISBN 9781944211257.

=== Works edited/prefaced/contributed ===
- Kreuter, Holly (2002). Drama in the Desert: The Sights and Sounds of Burning Man. Foreword by Dave Eggers. Raised Barn Press. ISBN 9780972178907.
- Eggers, Dave (2016). "Twenty Thousand Leagues Under the Sea". Stories Upon Stories. McSweeney's. ISBN 9781940450018.
- Hawkins, T.S. (2016). Some Recollections from a Busy Life: The Forgotten Story of the Real Town of Hollister, California. A reprint of an autobiography by Dave Eggers' great-great-great-grandfather, originally published in 1913. Introduction by Dave Eggers. McSweeney's. ISBN 9781940450896.

==== Voice of Witness series ====
Voice of Witness, founded by Dave Eggers and Lola Vollen, is a non-profit organization that uses oral history to illuminate contemporary human rights crises in the U.S. and around the world through an oral history book series and an education program. M.D. Mimi Lok joined in 2008 as Executive Director & Executive Editor.

- Eggers, Dave; Vollen, Lola, eds. (2005). Surviving justice : America's wrongfully convicted and exonerated. Introduction by Scott Turow. McSweeney's. ISBN 9781932416237.
- Eggers, Dave, ed. (2015). The voice of witness reader : ten years of amplifying unheard voices. McSweeney's. ISBN 9781940450773.
- Eggers, Dave, ed. (2023). The Voice of witness reader : the first ten. Haymarket Books. ISBN 9781642595390.

=== Film contributions ===
- Away We Go (Motion picture). Screenplay by Dave Eggers and Vendela Vida. 2009.
- Where the Wild Things Are (Motion picture). Screenplay by Dave Eggers and director Spike Jonze. 2009.
- Promised Land (Motion picture). Story by Dave Eggers. Screenplay by Matt Damon and John Krasinski. 2012.
- A Hologram for the King (Motion picture). Directed by Tom Tykwer. Story based on Egger's novel A Hologram for the King. 2016.
- Your Mother and I (a short film). Screenplay by Dave Eggers, Julia Jackman, and Anna Maguire. Story based on Eggers’ short story "Your Mother and I". 2016.
- The Circle (Motion picture). Screenplay by Dave Eggers and James Ponsoldt. Story based on Egger's novel The Circle. Performed by Emma Watson, Tom Hanks, and John Boyega. 2017.

=== Music contributions ===
- Eggers can be heard talking with Spike Jonze during "The Horrible Fanfare/Landslide/Exoskeleton", the final track on Beck's 2006 album The Information. The third section of the track features Eggers and Jonze responding to Beck's question, "What would the ultimate record that ever could possibly be made sound like?"
- Eggers contributed lyrics to the song "The Ghost of Rita Gonzolo" on One Ring Zero's album As Smart as We Are (2004).
- Eggers wrote the lyrics for the song "The Clown" for his project 30 Days, 30 Songs with music by Guster's Ryan Miller.

=== Short fiction ===
Title	Publication	Collected in
"After I Was Thrown in the River and Before I Drowned"	Speaking with the Angel (2000)	How We Are Hungry
"Where Were We"	The New Yorker (August 12, 2002)	from You Shall Know Our Velocity
"Up the Mountain Coming Down Slowly"	McSweeney's 10 (2002)	How We Are Hungry
"Marrakesh"	Punk Planet 55 (May–June 2003)	from You Shall Know Our Velocity
"The Only Meaning of the Oil-Wet Water"	Zoetrope: All-Story 7.2 (Summer 2003)	How We Are Hungry
"Something Might Plummet. Something Might Soar"	The Guardian (August 2, 2003)	Best American Nonrequired Reading 2003
"Climbing to the Window, Pretending to Dance" aka "Measuring the Jump"	The New Yorker (September 1, 2003)	How We Are Hungry
"Notes for a Story of a Man Who Will Not Die Alone"	Ninth Letter 1 (Spring-Summer 2004)	How We Are Hungry
"About the Man Who Began Flying After Meeting Her"	The Guardian (March 27, 2004)	How We Are Hungry
"On Wanting to Have Three Walls Up Before She Gets Home"	The Guardian (April 3, 2004)	How We Are Hungry
"You'll Have to Save That for Another Time"	The Guardian (April 10, 2004)	Short Short Stories
"What It Means When a Crowd in a Faraway Nation Takes a Soldier Representing Your Own Nation, Shoots Him, Drags Him from His Vehicle and Then Mutilates Him in the Dust"	The Guardian (April 17, 2004)	How We Are Hungry
"The Young Woman Appreciates Having Food Even Though She Has Never Gone Hungry"	The Guardian (April 24, 2004)	-
"On Making Someone a Good Man by Calling Him a Good Man"	The Guardian (May 1, 2004)	Short Short Stories
"Naveed" aka "Stephanie Can't Do 13"	The Guardian (May 8, 2004)	How We Are Hungry
"Madeline Smiles at the Thought"	The Guardian (May 15, 2004)	-
"Woman Waiting to Take a Photo"	The Guardian (May 22, 2004)	-
"When He Started Saying 'I Appreciate It' After 'Thank You'"	The Guardian (May 29, 2004)	Short Short Stories
"You Know How to Spell Elijah"	The Guardian (June 5, 2004)	Short Short Stories
"The Definition of Reg"	The Guardian (June 12, 2004)	Short Short Stories
"She Waits, Seething, Blooming"	The Guardian (June 19, 2004)	How We Are Hungry
"On Seeing Bob Balaban in Person Twice in One Week"	The Guardian (June 26, 2004)	Short Short Stories
"Older Man Tries Not to Groan in an Overly Desperate Way While Holding His Younger Girlfriend"	The Guardian (July 3, 2004)	-
"How Do the Koreans Feel About the Germans?"	The Guardian (July 10, 2004)	Short Short Stories
"The Heat and Eduardo, Part I"	The Guardian (July 17, 2004)	Short Short Stories
"The Heat and Eduardo, Part II"	The Guardian (July 24, 2004)	Short Short Stories
"Of Gretchen and de Gaulle" aka "Gretchen the Squid"	The Guardian (July 31, 2004)	Short Short Stories
"They Decide to Have No More Death"	The Guardian (August 7, 2004)	Short Short Stories
"The Weird Wife"	The Guardian (August 14, 2004)	Short Short Stories
"The Woman Wondered How People Did It"	The Guardian (August 21, 2004)	-
"When They Learned to Yelp"	The Guardian (August 28, 2004)	How We Are Hungry
"The Boy They Didn't Take Pictures Of"	The Guardian (September 4, 2004)	-
"Woman, Foghorn"	The Guardian (September 11, 2004)	Short Short Stories
"How Long It Took"	The Guardian (September 18, 2004)	Short Short Stories
"Your Mother and I"	h2so4 19 (Autumn-Winter 2004)	How We Are Hungry
"But Is That Irony or Something Else?"	The Guardian (September 25, 2004)	-
"A Whispered Hello"	The Guardian (October 2, 2004)	-
"Sleep to Dreamier Sleep Be Wed"	The Guardian (October 9, 16 & 23, 2004)	Short Short Stories
"She Needed More Nuance"	The Guardian (October 30, 2004)	Short Short Stories
"Alameda"	The Guardian (November 6, 2004)	-
"Georgia Is Lost" aka "Rodney Is Looking for His Daughter"	The Guardian (November 13, 2004)	Short Short Stories
"This Flight Attendant (Gary, Is It?) Is on Fire!"	The Guardian (November 20, 2004)	Short Short Stories
"True Story, 1986, Midwest, USA, Tuesday"	The Guardian (November 27, 2004)	Short Short Stories
"This Certain Song" aka "Catchy, But Not Danceable"	The Guardian (December 4, 2004)	Short Short Stories
"A Circle Like Some Circles" aka "A Perfect Circle"	The Guardian (December 11, 2004)	Short Short Stories
"Another"	How We Are Hungry (2004)	How We Are Hungry
"Quiet"	How We Are Hungry (2004)	How We Are Hungry
"There Are Some Things He Should Keep to Himself"	How We Are Hungry (2004)	How We Are Hungry
"It Is Finally Time to Tell the Story"	The Guardian (January 1, 2005)	Short Short Stories
"What the Water Feels Like to the Fishes"	The Guardian (January 8, 2005)	Short Short Stories
"The End of Tejada"	The Guardian (January 15, 2005)	-
"Roderick Hopes"	The Guardian (January 22, 2005)	Short Short Stories
"Should You Lie About Having Read That Book?"	The Guardian (January 29, 2005)	-
"Tracy and Her Loyalty"	The Guardian (February 5, 2005)	-
"A No on Debussy"	The Guardian (February 12, 2005)	-
"Outside This One Time"	The Guardian (February 19, 2005)	-
"I Will Always Love You"	The Guardian (February 26, 2005)	-
"No Safe Harbor"	The Guardian (March 5, 2005)	-
"Unlikely Meetings, Part XXIV"	The Guardian (March 12, 2005)	-
"Fecal Matter of the USA"	The Guardian (March 19, 2005)	-
"The Immortal Fly Is Tired"	The Guardian (March 26, 2005)	-
"These Certain Young People"	The Guardian (April 2, 2005)	-
"Types of Pain, Their Duration and Intentions"	The Guardian (April 9, 2005)	-
"Accident"	The Guardian (April 16, 2005)	-
"We Can Work It Out"	The Guardian (April 23, 2005)	-
"When the Fishes Were Stopped by a Policeman"	The Guardian (April 30, 2005)	-
"These Two Cousins"	The Guardian (May 7, 2005)	-
"About the Man Uglier and Scarier Than Ratzinger"	The Guardian (May 14, 2005)	-
"True Story, Kansas City, 2003"	The Guardian (May 21, 2005)	-
"And Built Like a Little Bodybuilder"	The Guardian (May 28, 2005)	-
"The End Is Nigh"	The Guardian (June 4, 2005)	-
"The Battle Between the Giant Squid and the Bears of Yosemite"	The Guardian (June 11, 2005)	-
"Theo"	The Book of Other People (2007)	-
"A Fork Brought Along"	The Guardian (August 1, 2009)	-
"Max at Sea"	The New Yorker (August 24, 2009)	from The Wild Things
"Who Knocks?"	Shadow Show: All-New Stories in Celebration of Ray Bradbury (2012)	-
"We Like You So Much and Want to Know You Better"	The New York Times (September 22, 2013)	from The Circle
"The Alaska of Giants and Gods"	The New Yorker (November 17, 2014)	from Heroes of the Frontier
"The Museum of Rain"	The Museum of Rain (2021)	-
"Where the Candles Are Kept"	Small Odysseys: Selected Shorts Presents 35 New Stories (2022)	-
"The Honor of Your Presence"	One Story 302 (June 22, 2023)	-
"The Comebacker"	The Atlantic (September 2023)	-
"The Keeper of the Ornaments"	The Keeper of the Ornaments (2024)	-
