= Sebastian Suhl =

American fashion industry executive

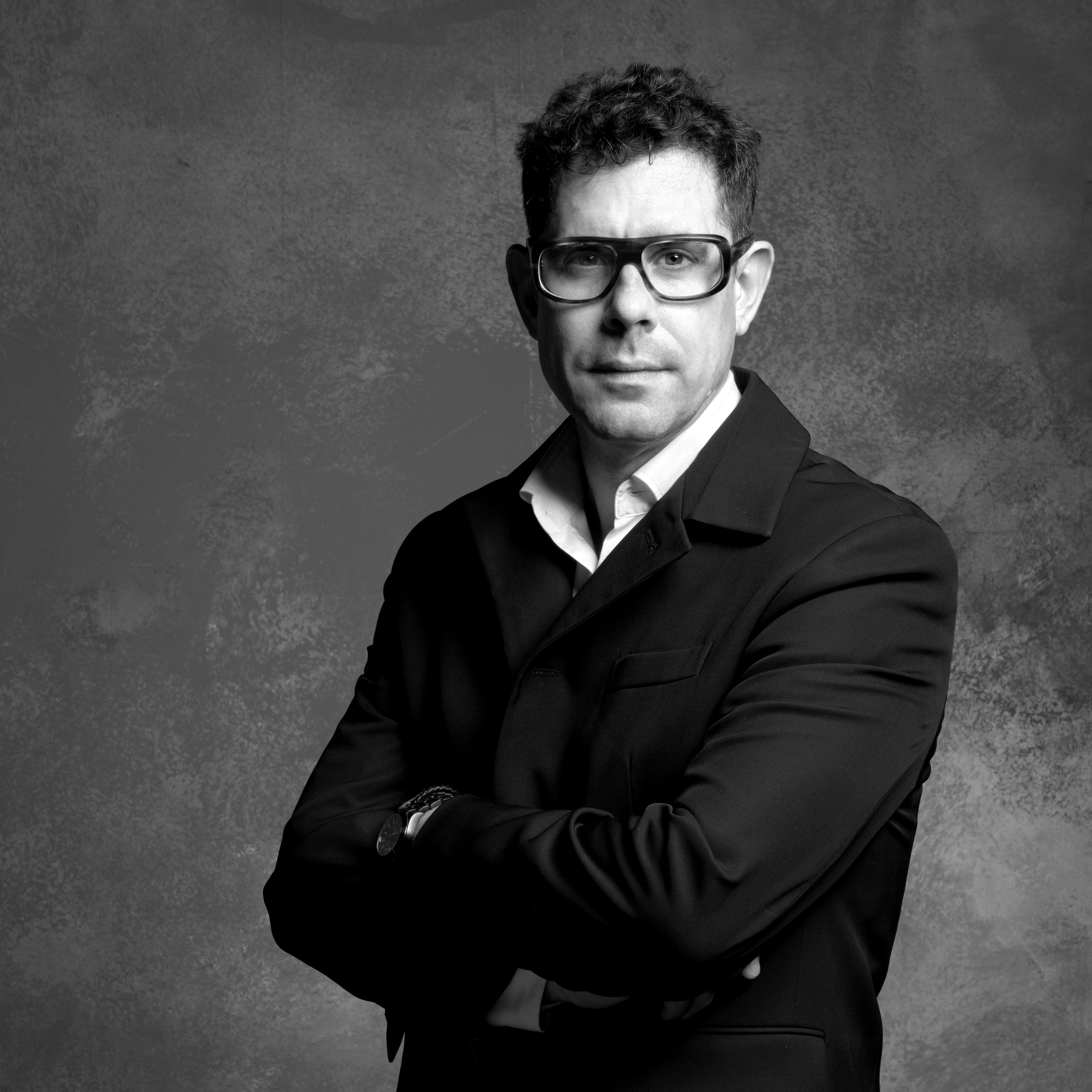
- Suhl in 2024
- Born: December 5, 1967 (age 58); New York City, U.S.
- Education: Colorado College, ESADE
- Occupation: CEO
- Years active: 1997 - present
- Employer(s): Prada, Givenchy, Marc Jacobs, Valentino, Trussardi, Mosaiq Group, END. Clothing

Sebastian Suhl (born 1967 in New York City, USA) is an American fashion executive who was instrumental in Prada's retail expansion and 2011 initial public offering and who later became chief executive officer of Givenchy.

Suhl was chief executive officer of the Milanese luxury brand Trussardi from 2020 to 2023. Previously he facilitated Valentino’s international brand expansion as the Managing Director of global markets from 2017. He was chief executive officer of the New York-based fashion company Marc Jacobs from September 2014. Suhl was chief executive officer of French fashion House Givenchy, also part of the LVMH Group, from early 2012. From 2001 to 2011 he held various positions in Prada Group, the latest as Chief Operating Officer.

== Education ==
After earning a bachelor's degree in world political economy from Colorado College (USA) in 1989, Suhl completed his master's degree in Business Administration at Esade in Barcelona in 1992.

== Career ==
Suhl started his career in 1992 as a senior auditor with Deloitte & Touche in Barcelona, before moving to Paris in 1996 to take up a position as engagement manager at strategy consultancy firm, Solving International.

In 1997 Suhl was co-founder and managing director at Thimister, a start up couture house. Two years later, in 1999, he was appointed director of business development at Courreges.

During the early 2000s Suhl carried on his career at Prada Group (which incorporates the Prada, Miu Miu, Church's and Car Shoe brands). In 2001 he was appointed General Manager in France. In 2005, he became Chief Executive Officer Asia Pacific & China for the Prada Group, in Hong Kong. In 2009 he was appointed Prada Group's Chief Operating Officer and moved to Milan. Suhl was involved in the success of the IPO of the brand on the Hong Kong Stock Exchange in 2011.

Suhl joined Givenchy, the LVMH-owned label, in 2012. Suhl had planned to open 24 new stores within the year 2014.

In September 2014, he was appointed chief executive officer of Marc Jacobs, coinciding with Jacobs's departure from Louis Vuitton and announcement that he would concentrate on his own brand.

In 2018 Suhl joined Valentino as Managing Director – Global Markets. In this role, Suhl was in charge of the global commercial function – retail, e-commerce and sales.

In 2020 Suhl was appointed chief executive officer of Italian house Trussardi. Trussardi had recently been acquired by an Italian private equity fund and Suhl was tasked with the revival of the house. He named new creative directors and set out a new brand identity. He also reopened the historic Palazzo Trussardi in Milan, in a joint venture with Michelin chef Giancarlo Perbellini.

In 2024 Suhl participated with a group of Italian entrepreneurs and the private equity fund Arca Space Capital in the creation of Mosaiq Group, a new entity aggregating companies that specialize in luxury and sustainable packaging. He was named chief executive officer and member of the Board of Directors of Mosaiq Group in June 2024.

In September 2024, Suhl was appointed as a Non-Executive Director of the Board of END., a UK-based retailer specializing in luxury streetwear and sportswear. On May 1, 2025, he became CEO of the company. His appointment was confirmed following a global executive search and was unanimously approved by the board.

== Public speaking ==
Suhl has spoken at the Financial Times Business of Luxury Summit in Los Angeles as well as the Business of Design Week Forum in Hong Kong.
