= Amir Soghrati =

Iranian painter, art researcher, critic, and curator

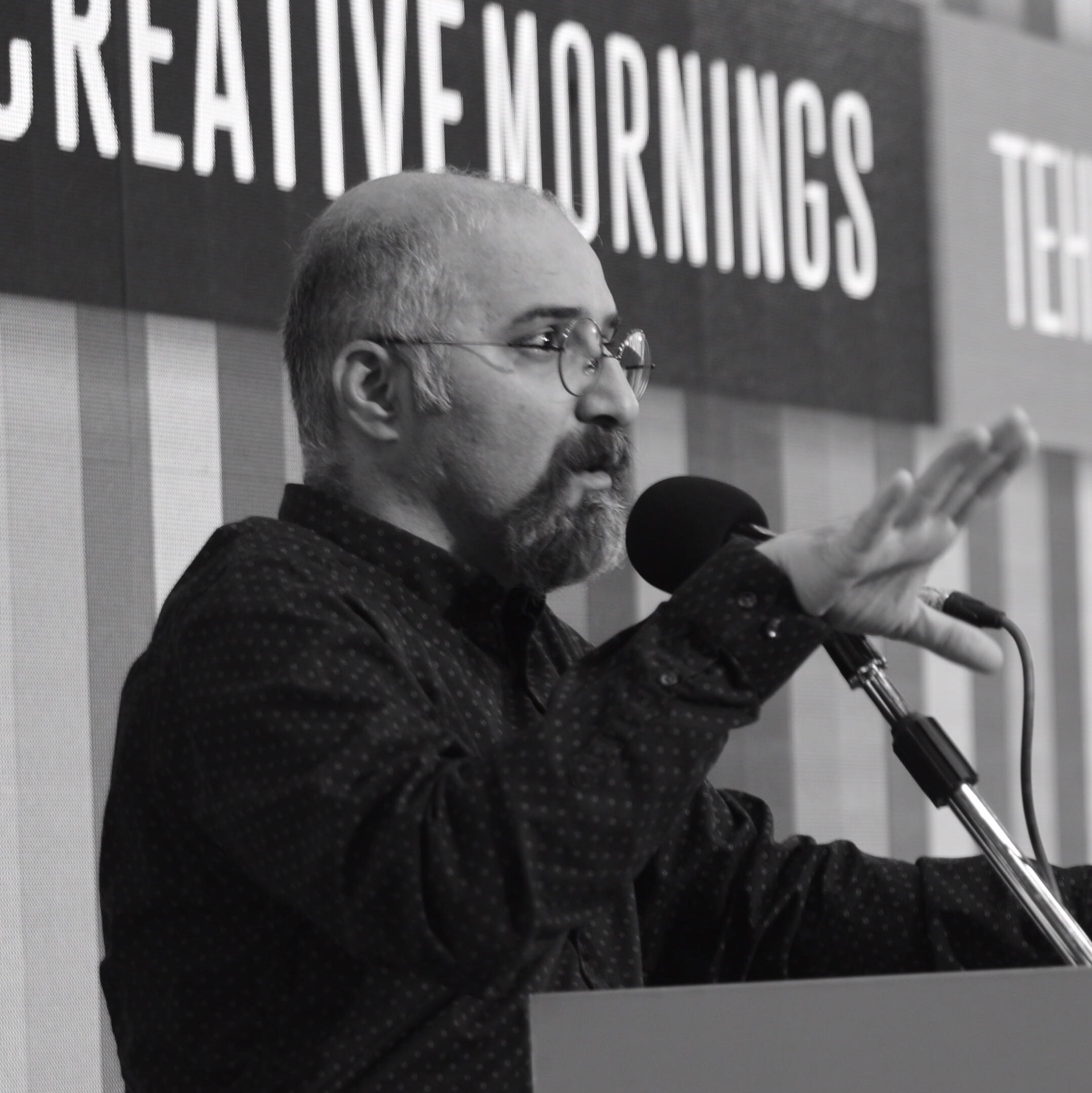
- Amir Soghrati speaking at the CreativeMornings event in Tehran
- Born: 22 June 1979 (age 46); Rasht, Iran
- Education: Press Graphic Design, Center for Media Studies and Research, Tehran
- Years active: 1990s–present
- Known for: Painting, Art Research, Art Criticism, Curatorship

Amir Soghrati (born 22 June 1979 in Rasht) is an Iranian painter, art researcher, critic, and curator. His works and writings on the history and criticism of Iranian visual arts have been published, and he has held numerous solo and group exhibitions both in Iran and abroad. He is the author and compiler of several books on Iranian artists and the visual history of Tehran, and in 2020, he wrote and directed the documentary series A Century of Visual Arts; One Hundred Years of Iranian Visual Arts.

== Early life and education ==
Soghrati was born in Rasht and studied Press Graphic Design at the Center for Media Studies and Research in Tehran. His earliest works were published in the mid-1990s in periodicals, and over time he became known as a writer and critic in specialized visual arts publications.

== Professional career ==
=== Journalism and art criticism ===
Soghrati has collaborated for many years with specialized art publications, and columns such as Gallery Visits and Studio Visits have been published in specialized magazines. In November 2018, he was appointed Artistic Director of the 11th Fajr Visual Arts Festival and conducted interviews with the media about the festival’s new approaches.

=== Curatorship and art management ===
Soghrati’s curatorial works include exhibitions such as Design as Living (Iran Artists Forum, 2018) and Forty Index (Imam Ali Museum, 2018). He also participated in the policy council of the second edition of the program A Gallery as Vast as the City (2016).

== Exhibitions ==
=== Solo (selected) ===
- Unmarked Memories, Golestan Gallery, October 2011.
- Living; Creation and Destruction, Golestan Gallery, December 2013.
- Khatranj, Design Exhibition, Dena Gallery, November 2015.
- Frequency of Silence, Design Exhibition, Dastan Basement Gallery, June 2017.
- Tasian or Unknown Anxiety, Painting Installation, Homa Gallery, July 2019.
- Pseudo-Memories, Painting, Sales Gallery, July 2022.
- Wings of Icarus, Painting, Sales Gallery, October 2024.

=== Group (selected) ===
- Micro–Macro, Fornaresio Gallery, Turin, 2021.
- Above & Beyond, Arta Gallery, Toronto, 2023 (Curator: Parham Didavar).
- Poetry of Nature, two Iranian artists, Paris (Marché Dauphine / Maryam Ahi Gallery), 2023.

== Selected Bibliography ==
- Living; Creation and Destruction (Selected Paintings), Idea Creativity, 2013.
- Parviz Shapour (Golestan Art), Peykare, 2014.
- Ardeshir Mohasses (Golestan Art), Peykare, 2015.
- One Hundred Years of Painting in Tehran; Tehran in Painting from Qajar to Contemporary, Elmi & Farhangi, 2020.
- Standing Amid Chaos and Beauty; Dialogue with Ali Nasir (Bilingual), 009
