= Design Museum of Chicago =

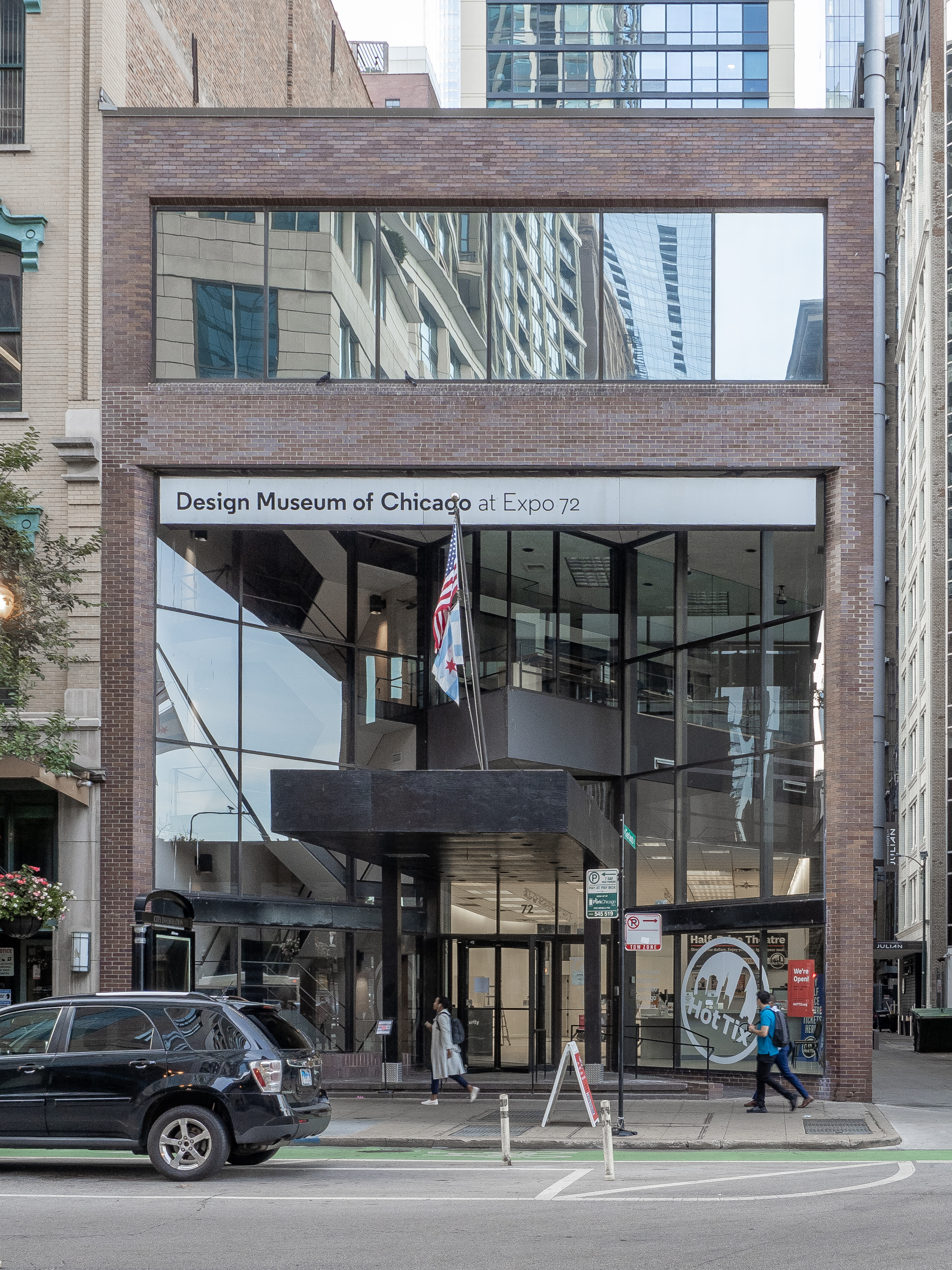
- As Seen from Randolph St (2021)
- Former name: Chicago Design Museum
- Established: 2012
- Location: Chicago, Illinois, United States
- Coordinates: 41.8846153°N 87.6276773°W
- Type: Design museum
- Director: Tanner Woodford
- Public transit access: State & Lake Station, Chicago Transit Authority
- Website: designchicago.org

The Design Museum of Chicago or "DMoC" (formerly Chicago Design Museum) is a museum of design in Chicago. It was founded by Tanner Woodford in 2012 as a pop-up museum, and hosted exhibitions in different venues around Chicago in 2012 and 2013. Following a successful Kickstarter crowdfunding campaign in 2014, the museum opened a permanent location in the Block 37 building. In late 2018, the museum moved to Expo 72 (72 E. Randolph St). After fourteen years, Tanner Woodford stepped down as executive director to found Iterative Work, an independent design studio.

== Mission and purpose ==
The mission of the Design Museum of Chicago is to "educate, inspire, and foster innovation through design."

Its programs are collaborative and community-based, largely relying on local volunteers for exhibit design, curation, registration, marketing, and other core museological functions. With a small staff, its foundation is "in its many volunteers' visions and labor."

The museum is a non-profit 501(c)(3) organization that believes design has the capacity to fundamentally improve the human condition. It fosters free, open, and honest engagement with diverse audiences through a permanent collection, rotating exhibitions, and educational programming.

== Exhibitions ==
Exhibitions focus on a broad, cross-disciplinary definition of design, encompassing graphic design, architecture, urban planning, interior design, systems thinking, and more.

- Letters Beyond Form: Chicago Types (November 9, 2024 – April 4, 2025)
- Voices Embodied: Reverberations (July 13 – October 13, 2024)
- Chicago Public Schools All-City Visual Arts Exhibitions 2024 (May 3 – June 2, 2024)
- SOLVE: Puzzle Design Exhibit (December 8, 2023 – March 31, 2024)
- At the Precipice: Responses to the Climate Crisis (July 14 – October 30, 2023)
- Chicago Public Schools All-City Visual Arts Exhibitions (April 29 – June 2, 2023)
- Free & Open Chicago: Cheers to 10 Years! (November 17, 2022 – April 2, 2023)
- ID@85: 85 Years of Making the Future (October 19, 2022 – Ongoing)
- The Correct Time: One Clock Per Minute (July 16, 2022 – October 17, 2022)
- Chicago Public Schools All-City Visual Arts Exhibition 2022 (May 11, 2022 – June 22, 2022)
- Tomorrow, and Tomorrow and Tomorrow (April 15, 2022 – April 16, 2022)
- All Together Now: Sound x Design (November 13, 2021 – April 3, 2022)
- Chicago Public Schools All-City Visual Arts Exhibition 2021 (January 1, 2021 – December 31, 2021)
- A Designed Life (June 12, 2021 – September 19, 2021)
- Chicago: Home of House at The Catacombs (May 8, 2021 – June 30, 2021)
- Chicago Public Schools All-City Visual Arts Exhibition 2020 (May 29, 2020 – December 31, 2020)
- Great Ideas of Humanity: Passing the Torch (February 25, 2020 – December 31, 2020)
- Setting the Stage: Objects of Chicago Theatre (June 29, 2019 – January 5, 2020)
- Chicago Public Schools All-City Visual Arts Exhibition 2019 (April 10, 2019 – May 12, 2019)
- Keep Moving: Designing Chicago's Bicycle Culture (October 27, 2018 – March 3, 2019)
- Keep Moving: Shifting Gears (November 17, 2018 – January 18, 2019)
- Great Ideas of Humanity: Out of the Container (April 20, 2018 – August 18, 2018)
- HEY! PLAY! Games in Modern Culture (October 20, 2017 – March 10, 2018)
- Confluence • 20+ Creative Ecologies of Hong Kong (October 14, 2017 – November 4, 2017)
- Dan Friedman: Radical Modernist (April 28, 2017 – August 12, 2017)
- City of Ideas: Architects' Voices and Visions (October 22, 2016 – February 25, 2017)
- ChicagoMade: Great Ideas of Humanity (December 1, 2016 – December 3, 2016)
- Unfolded: Made with Paper (April 5, 2016 – August 26, 2016)
- New Horizon: Architecture from Ireland (October 2, 2015 – January 30, 2016)
- The State of Detroit (April 28, 2015 – August 29, 2015)
- Deborah Sussman Loves Los Angeles! (November 13, 2014 – February 28, 2015)
- Starts/Speculations: Graphic Design in Chicago Past and Future (June 12, 2014 – September 30, 2014)
- Work at Play (June 1, 2013 – June 30, 2013)
- A—Z: Art on Track (September 22, 2012)
- Inaugural Exhibition: 700 N Sacramento (June 1, 2012 – June 30, 2012)

== Notable projects ==
=== VaxChiNation Artist campaign ===
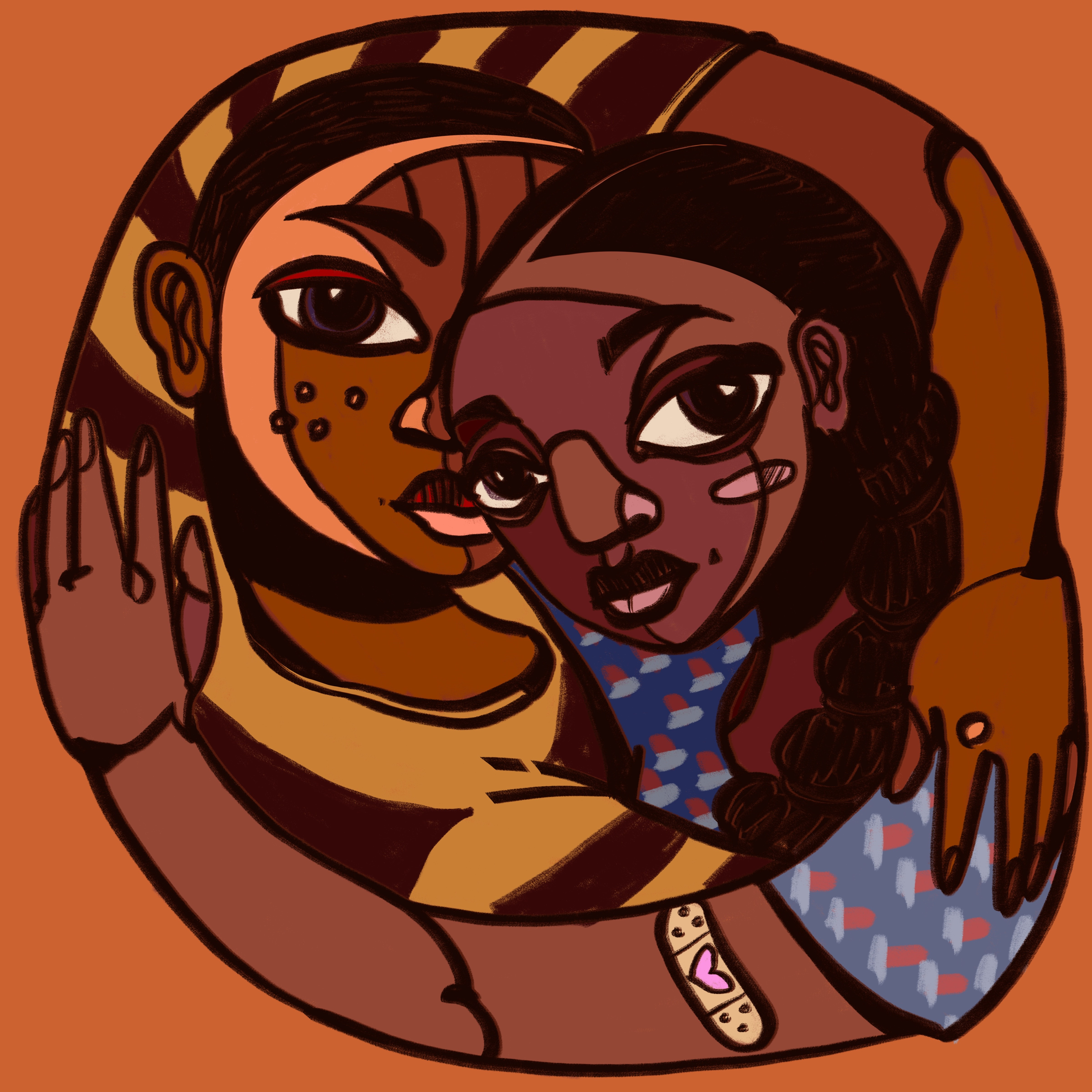
Artwork by Langston Allston

In 2021, the Design Museum joined with the Chicago Department of Public Health and the Chicago Department of Cultural Affairs and Special Events to commission more than 80 local artists to "design original art exploring themes of health, vitality, community, and vaccine distribution to encourage everyone to get vaccinated." The commissioned art is featured on print and digital billboards throughout Chicago neighborhoods and on social media channels.

Some artists in the campaign include: Afrokilla, Alice Hargrave, Anthony Lewellen, Ashley Lin, Bob Faust, CZR PRZ, Carlos Rolón, Carlos Segura, Cody Hudson, Cristi López, Dan Grzeca, Dont Fret, Elloo, Emmy Star Brown, Esther Garcia, Gabriel Villa, Hector Duarte, Jason Pickleman, Jeff Zimmerman, Johnny Sampson, Kelly Knaga, Langston Allston, Lori Seidemann, Moises Salazar, Penny Pinch, Pouya Ahmadi, Rosemary Holiday Hall, Rubén Aguirre, Shannon Downey, Sonnenzimmer, Substance Collective, The Kid From Pilsen, Thomas Williams, Unyimeabasi Udoh, William J. O’Brien, and Won Kim.

=== Great Ideas of Humanity ===
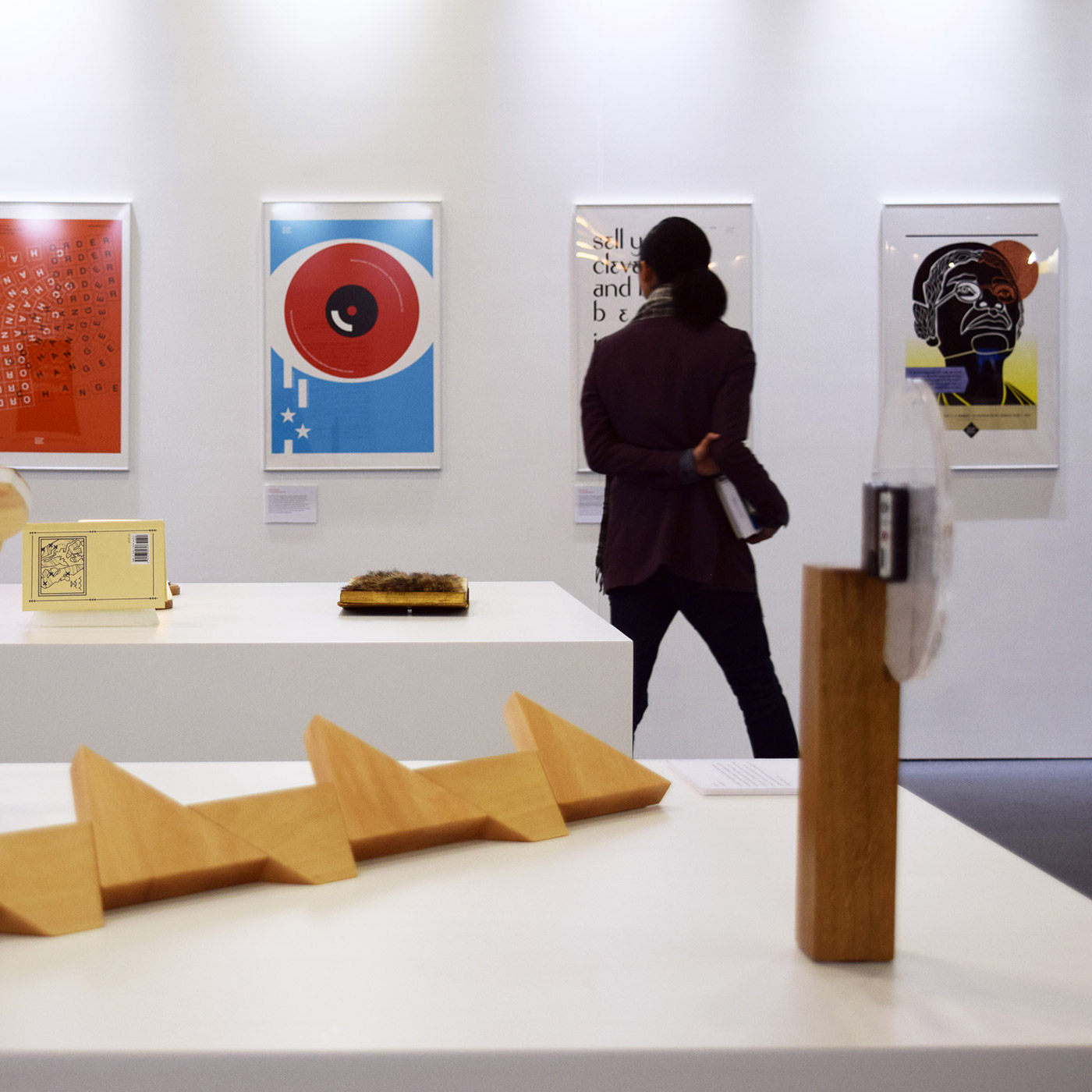
Great Ideas of Humanity exhibition in Hong Kong

Great Ideas of Humanity is a series of advertisements in which contemporary artists and designers are asked to create artwork that responds to quotes by leading scientists, philosophers, and academics. The series serves as "an acknowledgment of the increasing globalization or our world and resulting cross-pollination of ideas, philosophies, societies, and culture," and is inspired by the Great Ideas of Western Man campaign by Chicago's Container Corporation of America. Advertisements from this series have been displayed downtown Chicago on its bus rapid transit advertisement stanchions, and in Hong Kong at the Business of Design Week InnoTech Design Expo.

Contributors include Matthew Hoffman on Susan B. Anthony, Andy Gregg on Mary Wollstonecraft, Renata Graw on Hypatia, 50,000feet on Goethe, Margot Harrington on Sojourner Truth, Cocu Liu on George Sand, Pouya Ahmadi on Rumi, Patternbase on Lucy Larcom, Eileen Tjan on Goethe, Kimberly Terzis on Anne Sophie Swetchine, Alexander Skoirchet on Buddha, Marcus Norman on Lucy Larcom, Tanner Woodford on Edith Wharton, Veronica Corzo-Duchardt on Goethe, LaShun Tines on Frederick Douglass, Matthew Terdich on Benjamin Franklin, Bibliothèque on Alfred North Whitehead, Hugh Dubberly on John Dewey, and Ivan Chermayeff on Oliver Wendell Holmes Sr.

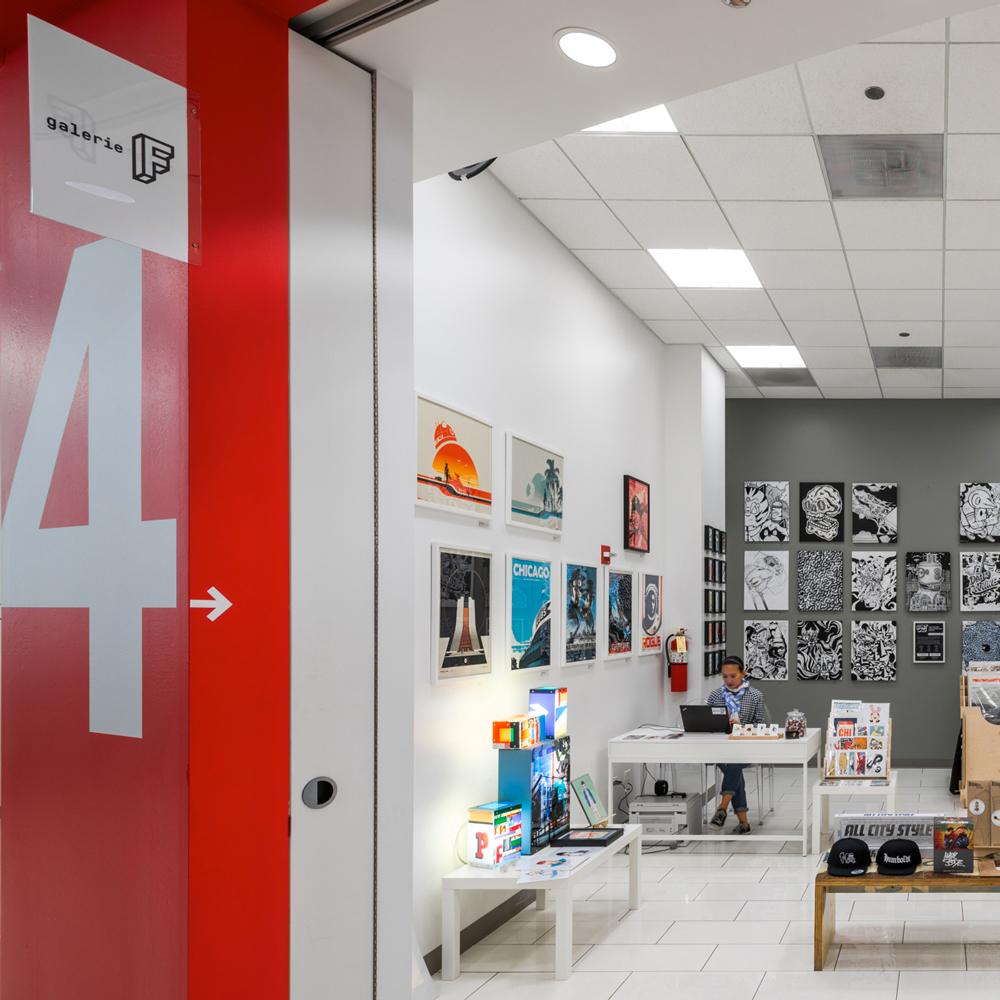
Chicago Design Market

=== Chicago Design Market ===
The Chicago Design Market is "a rotating series of pop-up shops that create the unexpected by placing small emerging artists alongside larger established businesses. Located on the third floor of Block 37, "shops are not charged for utilities and do not pay a fixed monthly rent. Instead, the museum takes a sales commission. This allows small designers or businesses, such as Aviate Press, to market in a retail space, while allowing larger establishments, such as Cards Against Humanity, to experiment with both the space and their business model."

Stores are selected via an application process. They include: Cards Against Humanity, The Colossal Shop, You Are Beautiful, Fourneau Bread Oven, School of the Art Institute of Chicago, Resketch, Sweetwater Foundation, Shawnimals, Aviate Press, AIA Chicago, Dock 6 Collective and mercer & winnie.

=== The Design Pack ===
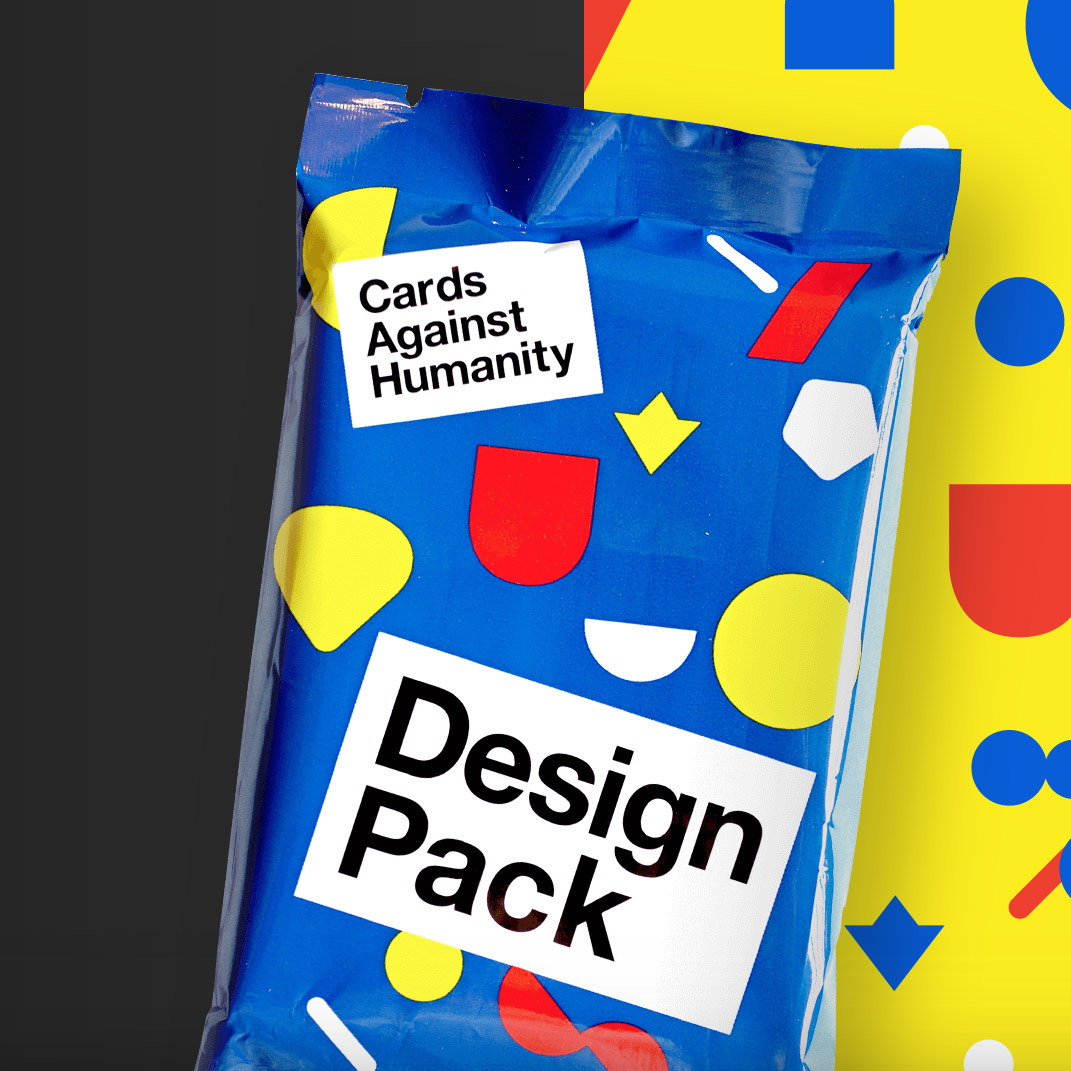
Cards Against Humanity Design Pack

The Design Pack is a Cards Against Humanity expansion pack that includes 30 illustrated cards that interpret George Carlin's infamous 1972 monologue, "Seven Words You Can Never Say on Television." All proceeds from the Design Pack benefit the Design Museum of Chicago, with sales surpassing $130,000 in its first few days on the market. Similar non-profit packs by Cards Against Humanity have raised nearly millions of dollars for partner organizations DonorsChoose.org, the Wikimedia Foundation, and the Sunlight Foundation.

Contributors to the Design Pack include Laura Park, Shawna X, Chad Kouri, Susan Kare, Yann Legendre, Paula Scher, Jay Ryan, Mike McQuade, Paul Octavious, Erik Spiekermann, Max Temkin, Debbie Millman, Art Paul, Simon Whybray, Mike Mitchell, Scott Thomas, Matthew Terdich, Jez Burrows, Jason Polan, Jessica Hische, Cody Hudson, Nick Adam, Matthew Hoffman, Magdalena Wistuba + Anna Mort, Eric Hu, Olly Moss, Tanner Woodford, Milton Glaser, and Sonnenzimmer.

== Brand identity ==
The Design Museum of Chicago’s current logo was designed by Chicago-based Substance Collective. Its inspiration was the city’s notable urban grid organizing “the interconnectivity of streets, thoroughfares, blocks and diverse neighborhoods.”

== Leadership ==
After nearly fourteen years, Tanner Woodford chose to step down as executive director on January 31, 2026, and then remain involved as founder and board member.

== See also ==
- List of design museums
