= Anna Bond (illustrator) =

Chief creative officer, illustrator

- Occupations: Creative director, illustrator and co-owner and co-founder of Rifle Paper Co.
- Spouse: Nathan Bond
- Website: riflepaperco.com

Anna Bond is the chief creative officer, illustrator and co-owner of Rifle Paper Co, an international stationery and gift brand. She founded the company with her husband in 2009. As of 2016 the company reported $21.4 million in company revenue and has more than 90 product offerings.

== Career ==
Bond received a bachelor's degree in graphic design. After graduation, Media Group hired Bond as an art director. In 2008, she worked as a freelance illustrator and designed posters for Band Marino, her husband's band, as well as multiple clubs. Bond developed a line and established a company after designing wedding invitations for her friends. In November 2009, Bond founded Rifle Paper Co. with her husband Nathan Bond.

Anna Bond spoke at a CreativeMornings event in January 2013. In February 2015, Bond illustrated the 150th edition of Alice's Adventures in Wonderland. She received the ADC Young Guns 12 award the following month. The award recognizes promising art directors under the age of 30. Bond's illustrations have been featured in publications including Martha Stewart Living; O, The Oprah Magazine; Southern Living; InStyle;Lucky and Real Simple Wedding.

== Personal life ==
Anna Bond is married to Nathan Bond and resides in Winter Park, Florida.
