= Yoseka Stationery =

Stationery store in Greenpoint

- Interactive map of Yoseka Stationery

General information
- Location: 63 West Street, Brooklyn, New York City, United States
- Coordinates: 40.7285°N 73.9592°W

Yoseka Stationery is a stationery store in Greenpoint, Brooklyn. Creative Boom named it one of the best "online shops for stationery addicts."

== History ==
In 2017, husband and wife duo Neil and Daisy Chen founded Yoseka Stationery in order to provide Asian stationery goods in the United States. Neil Chen, a native of Taiwan, had grown up in his family's stationery store, also called Yoseka, and wanted to recreate that experience for Americans. They initially ran pop-ups and ran a monthly subscription service, after which they opened a brick-and-mortar store in Sunnyside, Queens in 2018. It relocated to Greenpoint, in Brooklyn, in 2020.

In 2024, Yoseka Stationery hosted a stationery festival from August 7–9 on the block of their Greenpoint location.
