= SaulPaul =

American rapper

- Born: Houston, Texas, United States
- Genres: Rap, acoustic hip hop
- Occupations: Rapper, singer-songwriter
- Instrument: Guitar
- Years active: 2002–present
- Website: saulpaul.com

SaulPaul is an American artist and rapper from Houston, Texas. He has garnered much attention with his freestyles. SaulPaul's music has been considered unique, in comparison to mainstream rappers.

He is most recognized for his "recap raps" that were featured weekly on ESPN Radio.

South by Southwest also taped SaulPaul for their annual SXSW conference and festivals, and his participation as the recap rapper for the SXSW keynotes for 2010, to the present.

== Early life ==
Hailing from Houston, Texas, SaulPaul grew up without a mother and father. His mother died when he was 3 years old, and he was raised by his grandmother in the ghetto of Houston. Later on in his life, he moved from house to house, living with different relatives.

Although he made it to college, by the second semester, he was expelled due to bad grades. Shortly thereafter, he went to the streets. SaulPaul committed credit card fraud and robberies, and was incarcerated at the Texas State Penitentiary. After serving two years, SaulPaul was readmitted to the University of Texas at Austin, and went on to graduate with honors.

== Personal life ==
SaulPaul's career in music production began when he placed a flyer, promoting his services in exchange for guitar or keyboard lessons. A storyteller at heart, SaulPaul shares his story as a musician, filmmaker, and author, with the goal of changing peoples lives positively.

He is a film producer and motivational speaker who has traveled across the United States, sharing his story of inspiration, and the message of his autobiographical film, Tower to Tower. The film traces his "journey from prison, where he ended up after flunking out of college, and then back to UT, where he eventually graduated with a degree in Radio-Television-Film in 2002."

Since graduation in 2002, "He traveled to Texas schools to inspire kids with similar backgrounds to stay out of trouble and go to college."

By 2010, SaulPaul's career was looking promising. He made a successful transition from being a hip hop artist and producer, to a multi-faceted musician, and full service music publisher. His music had been featured in commercials, film trailers, and movies, as well as on numerous websites.

SaulPaul has gained notoriety in various avenues, including the Austin South by Southwest Festival. He was featured as a rapper during the interactive session, and was recruited to "rap songs that recap keynotes."

In 2011, he moved to Atlanta {{Citation needed}}

As of the present, SaulPaul is getting paid to do what he loves, after growing up in an environment where it was just about getting paid. He continues to play the acoustic guitar, while rapping and singing. He is known for his on-the-spot freestyles for an ESPN affiliate. While dropping three albums, he has started and developed his own multimedia company, ReRoute Productions.

== Music career ==
=== Albums and Singles ===
- "Dream In 3D" (2015) received Grammy nomination consideration
- "Texas Two Step" (2015)
- "Mama" (2014)
- "I Can Only Be Me" (2013)
- "Rise" (2013)
- “Do That Hula Hoop” (2010)
- "Tower to Tower" (2010)
- "Remember The Name" (2004)
- "Get Ya Mind Right" (2004)

=== Music videos ===
- "Do That Hula Hoop ft.Rachael Lust" (2015)
- "Ima Tell The Truth" (2014)
- "RISE" (2013) screened at the first annual Austin Music Video Festival in 2015.
- "Shine Right Now" (2011)

=== Collaborations and Features ===
- "Johnson & Johnson Gateway to Health Initiative" (2015)
- "Honey Bunches of Oats: This Is For You" (2015)
- "Welcome to Austin, Texas" #IAMBLACKAUSTIN Campaign (2015)
- "Motivation" #Action2015 +SocialGood Campaign (2015)
- "What's the Cost" Touch of the King ft. Trampia, SaulPaul, and Adrien Austin of D'tour (2014)
- "Smilebooth Rap" (2013)

==== SXSW Keynote Recap Raps ====
- Princess Reema Bint Bandar Al-Saud, CEO of Alfa, Intl. (2015)
- Logan Green, CEO and co-founder of Lyft (2015)
- Dr. Astro Teller, GoogleX (2015)
- Chelsea Clinton, Vice Chair of the Clinton Foundation (2014)
- Adam Savage, Executive Producer and Co-Host of MythBusters (2014)
- Anne Wojcicki, CEO and co-founder of 23andMe (2014)
- Dr. Neil deGrasse Tyson, Astrophysicist and Author (2014)
- Austin Kloen, Author (2014)
- Elon Musk, SpaceX (2013)
- Tina Roth Eisenberg, Swiss Miss and Tattly (2013)
- Julie Uhrman of OUYA and Josh Topolsky of The Verge (2013)
- Matthew Inman, The Oatmeal (2013)
- David Grohl, Musician (2013)

== Production Portfolio ==
Film: Star of the autobiographical film Tower to Tower "Tower to Tower paints a textured picture of the 'hood' in which Neal grew up that was rich with pathos and struggle. The 35-minute-long film is not a typical documentary, but more of an MTV reality show."

Book: Author of Tower to Tower: Dream in 3-D SaulPaul was a featured speaker at the African American Book Festival in Austin, Texas during their "Black Men Writers Inspiring Change," themed conference. He held a workshop and shared how people can turn their passion into their profession.

Television: Star in #TourLife: Reality TV series that aired on AmericanED TV in 2014 documenting SaulPaul's summer tour during which he performed at the most notable music festivals of the season.

Mobile Gaming App: Main character in "SaulPaul: Dream in 3D," and educational game made for urban youth available on iPhone and Android.

Conference: Founder and host of Music Career Expo, a day of music industry professionals talking to middle school students about the career opportunities available outside of being a musician.

== Awards and recognition ==
- Seedling Foundation, Fab5 Award (2015)
- Austin City Council, June 12 SaulPaul Day Proclamation (2014)
- Austin Convention and Visitors Bureau, Creative Ambassador (2014)
- Deli Magazine, Artist of the Month (2014)
- Austin Music Foundation, Artist of the Month (2013)
- University of Texas at Austin, Young Alumnus of the Year (2012)
- Austin Under 40 Awards, Austinite of the Year and Arts, Music & Entertainment (2017)

== Notable Appearances ==
Year	Event	Location
2015		
	Texas on Tour at Union Square	San Francisco, CA
	Ohio State Fair	Columbus, OH
	Atlanta Hawks, Philips Arena	Atlanta, GA
	San Diego County Fair	San Diego, CA
	Core DJ Conference	Atlanta, GA
	NFL Draft Sports Career Expo	Chicago, IL
	Austin City Hall, SXSW Arts +SocialGood	Austin, TX
	Hollywood and Highland Center	Los Angeles, CA
	NFL Super Bowl XLIX Sports Career Expo	Phoenix, AZ
	SXSW United Nations Foundation Panel - How Art can Motivate Social Change	Austin, TX
2014		
	Moms +SocialGood	New York City, NY
	NFL PREP Super Bowl XLVIII Sports Career Expo	New York City, NY
	TEDxYouth@Austin	Austin, TX
	TEDxAustinWomen	Austin, TX
	Multnomah County City Hall	Portland, OR
2013		
	Music Career Expo	Austin, TX
	Houston Fringe Festival	Houston, TX
	Shop.org Annual Summit	Chicago, IL
	Cutting Edge Music Festival	New Orleans, LA
	Chicago Navy Pier - Austin Convention & Visitors Bureau's #ATXAirstream Tour	Chicago, IL
	Arts Edge Summit at the Kennedy Center for Performing Arts	Washington D.C.
	NFL PREP Super Bowl XLVII Sports Career Expo	New Orleans, LA
	Rachel Ray Feedback Party at Stubb's	Austin, TX
	Making Money AND a Difference with Mobile Game Apps	Austin, TX
