= Jan Kaláb =

Czech artist

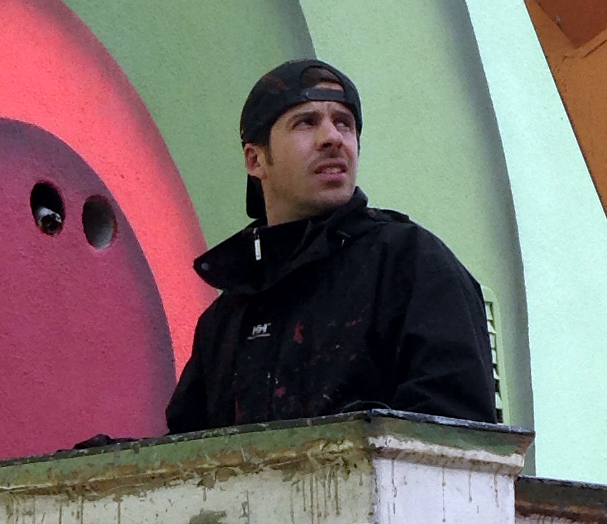
Jan Kaláb in 2013

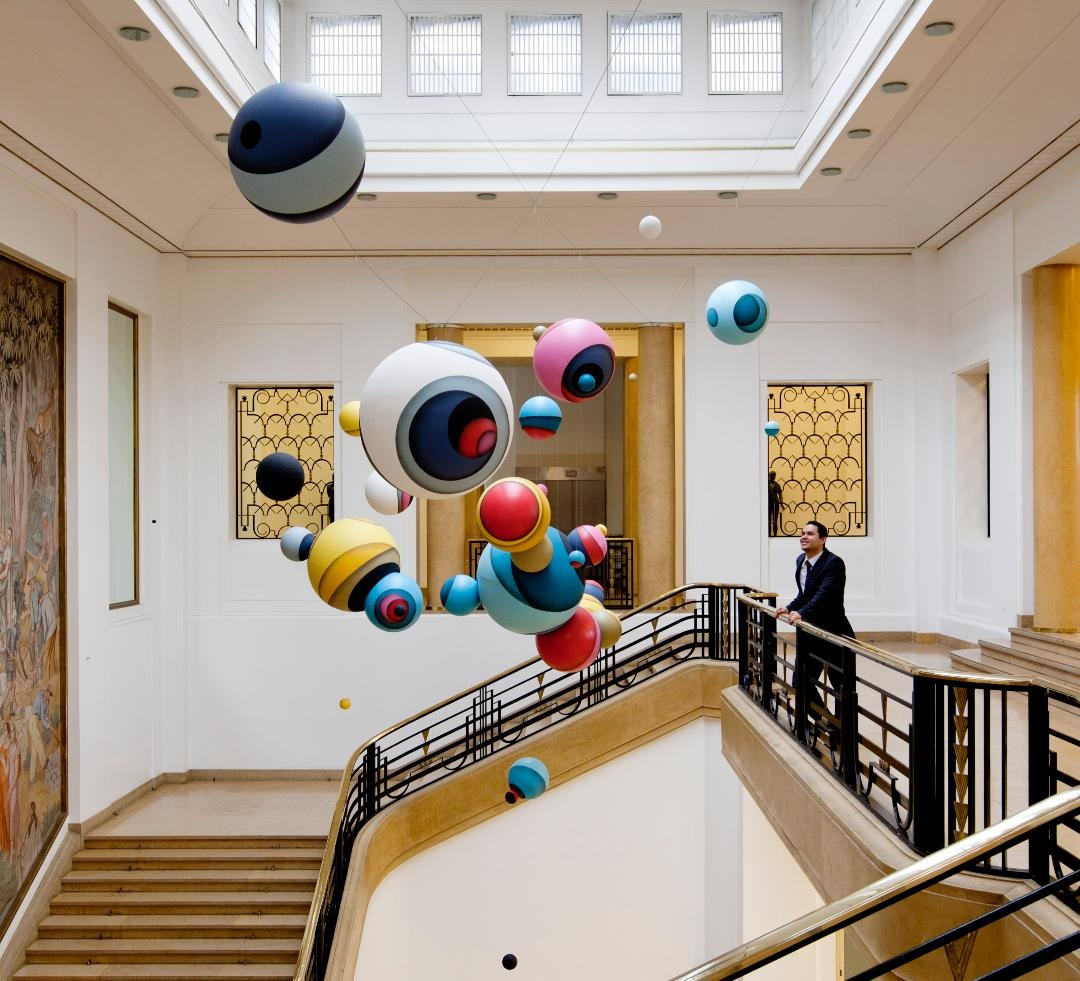
My Cosmos, a sculpture by Jan Kaláb

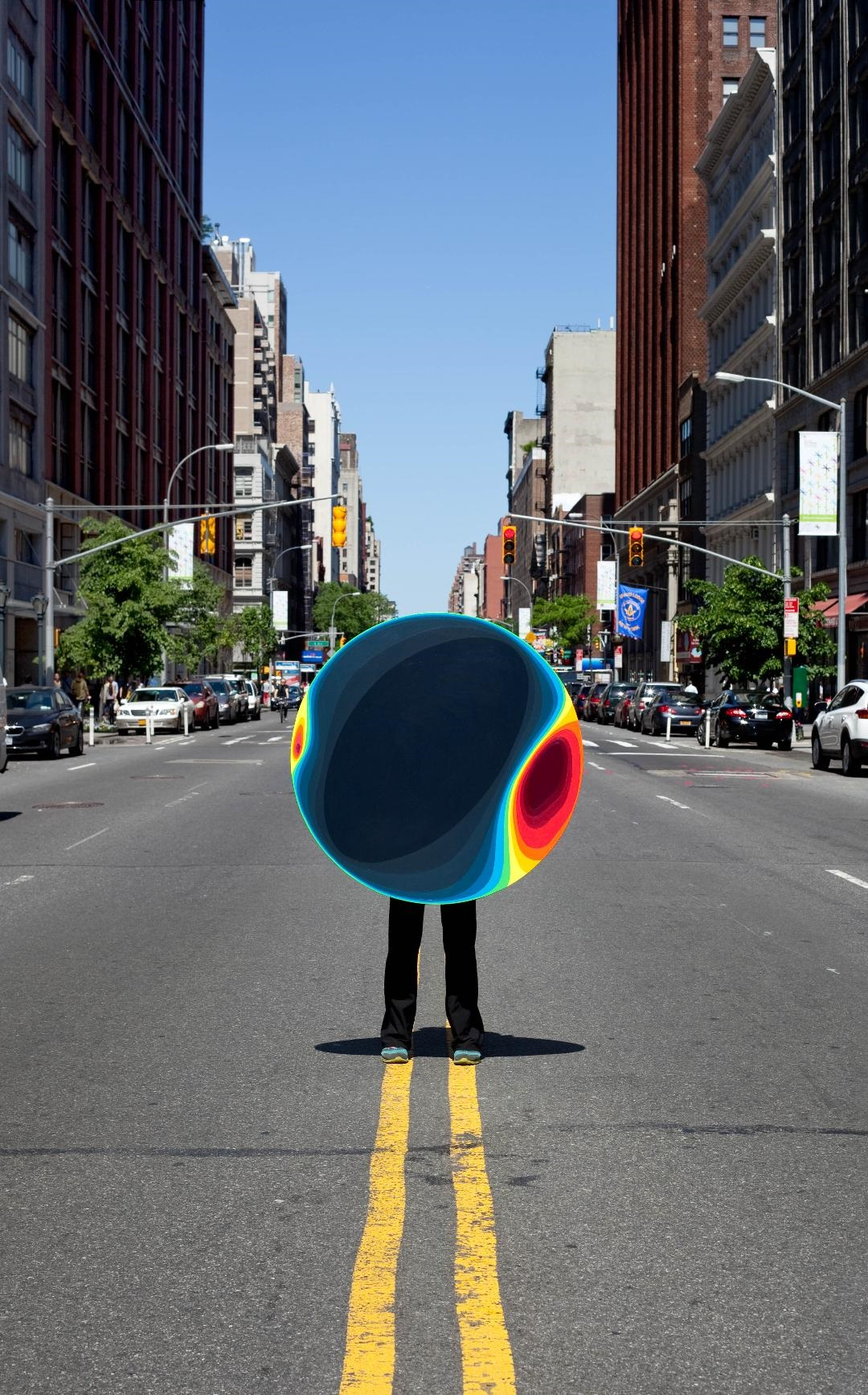
Acrylic painting by Jan Kaláb on a New York Street

Jan Kaláb (born 20 June 1978 in Prague) is a Czech visual artist, whose art features vibrantly colored, abstract designs of organic shapes in various formats, including paintings, sculptures, installations, and street murals. Having started as a graffiti artist, Kaláb's artwork has appeared in Albin Polasek Museum, the National Czech & Slovak Museum & Library, the MAXXI National Museum of 21st-Century Arts (Rome), and the Czech Radio. His art has been reviewed in art news media including Novinky.cz, Lidové noviny, Creative Boom, Aktuálně.cz, and iDNES.cz.

== Career ==
In his youth, Kaláb made street art in Prague, signing his works under the pseudonyms Cakes or Point. After several years as a graffiti artist, Kaláb entered the Academy of Fine Arts, Prague, earning a master's degree in 2006. Attracted by abstract Neoplasticism, his work moved from straight-lined sculptures and 3D alphabetic letter designs to work with the painted canvas, characterised by objects in organic shapes.

== Exhibitions ==
Kaláb had his first solo exhibition at the Trafo Gallery in Prague in 2008. Other solo shows of Kaláb's art in Prague took place in 2011, 2013, and 2015. Further solo exhibitions of his art have taken place in other cities, including Sofia (2011), Buenos Aires (2014), Bogota (2016), Berlin (2015), Paris (2016), Bologna (2017, 2019), London (2015, 2020), San Francisco (2018), Winter Park, FL (2018), Valencia (2019), Taipei (2019), and Miami (2019). Kaláb's artwork has also been included in collective art exhibitions in Amsterdam, Brno, Brooklyn, Göteborg, Hamburg, Krakow, Los Angeles, Manchester, Milan, Orebro, Putaux, Roma, Roudnice nad Labem, São Paulo, Shanghai, Stockholm, Völkliner, and Zlín.

== Murals ==
Mural painting is also a part of Kaláb's repertoire. His work was included in a monograph on mural art around the world published in 2010.
