= Zuzana Snow =

Slovakian model (born c. 1994)

- Born: 1994 (age 31–32); Slovakia
- Modeling information
- Height: 5 ft 10 in (1.78 m)
- Hair color: Dark brown
- Eye color: Blue

Zuzana Snow (born 1994) is a Slovak model.

== Career ==
She has walked the runways for Armani, Balmain, Dior, Chanel, Hugo Boss, Jean Paul Gaultier, Christian Lacroix, Van Cleef & Arpels, Chopard, Louis Vuitton, Gucci, Issey Miyake, and Trussardi.

Snow has appeared in editorials and advertisements in Vogue, Harper's Bazaar, Elle, Marie Claire, Amica, Soon, Black magazine, and Cosmopolitan. She was also featured on the covers of Harper's Bazaar, Zoot, Tribute, Univers Cannes, Vizon, and Femme.

== Agencies ==
- Major – Paris
- Major – Milan
- New York Model Management - New York City
- Model Management – Hamburg
- Sky Management - Tokyo
- Next Company – Vienna
- Group Models – Spain
- Chic Management – Sydney
- Elite Model Management - Amsterdam
- Option – Switzerland
- Elite – Stockholm
