= Debbie Millman =

American writer, educator, artist and designer

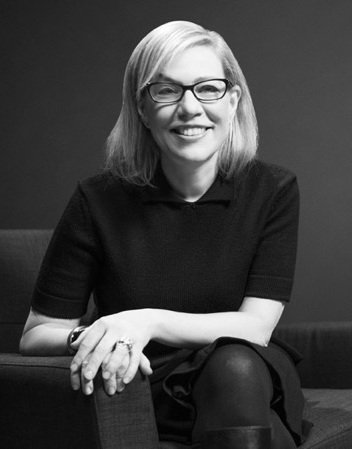
- Born: 1961 (age 64–65); New York, U.S.
- Education: University at Albany, SUNY (BA)
- Occupations: Artist; Writer; Designer
- Known for: Host of Design Matters
- Spouse: Roxane Gay (m. 2020)
- Website: debbiemillman.com

Debbie Millman (born 1961) is an American writer, educator, artist, curator, and designer who is best known as the host of the Design Matters. She is the chair and co-founder (with Steven Heller) of the Masters in Branding at the School of Visual Arts, and President Emeritus of the American Institute of Graphic Arts (AIGA). In 2024, Millman was appointed an Executive Fellow at the Harvard Business School.

Millman has authored eight books. She is a co-owner and editorial director of Print magazine, and co-owner and co-publisher of The Rumpus. Her writing and illustrations have appeared in many major publications, including the New York Times, the Washington Post, the Philadelphia Inquirer, New York Magazine, The Baffler, and Fast Company and more. Her artwork has been included in many museums and institutes including the Design Museum of Chicago and the Boston Biennale.

== Early life and education ==
Millman born in 1961 in Brooklyn, New York. Her father owned a pharmacy business and her mother was a seamstress. She attended the University at Albany, SUNY, where she earned a Bachelor of Arts degree in English with a minor in Russian literature in 1983. During her university years, Millman wrote for the student newspaper and later became the arts and features editor in her senior year. It was in this role, particularly through tasks involving the layout and design of the paper, that she first developed an interest in design.

== Career ==
=== 1983–2004: Early career, Hot 97, and Sterling Brands ===
Millman began her career in media, working for a cable magazine and a real estate firm before entering the design and branding industry with a role at Frankfurt Balkind.

In 1993, Millman became the off-staff creative director of HOT 97 in New York City, where she worked with Emmis Broadcasting general manager Judy Ellis and Promotion Director Rocco Macri to turn the dance music radio station into a hip-hop radio station. Millman created the HOT 97 logo in 1994 and then redesigned it again in 1999. Millman remained the creative director of the organization until 2005.

In 1995, Millman joined Sterling Brands in New York City, where she eventually became a partner, the president of the Design Division, and chief marketing officer. She worked on the redesign of Burger King, merchandising for Star Wars, and the positioning and branding of the NO MORE movement. In 2008, Millman and her partners sold Sterling Brands to Omnicom and she continued to work there until 2016.

In 2002, Millman became the editorial and creative director of Print.

=== 2004–present: Design Matters, School of Visual Arts, curation ===
In 2004, Millman founded a design podcast named Design Matters. The show started out at VoiceAmerica Business Radio, an internet radio network, where Millman paid them for airtime. Bill Drenttel of Design Observer asked her in 2009 to bring the show over and introduced her to Curtis Fox, who has remained the producer every since. Design Matters guests have included Massimo Vignelli, Steven Heller, Marian Bantjes, Tina Roth Eisenberg, and Stefan Sagmeister, Milton Glaser, Malcolm Gladwell, Daniel H. Pink, Barbara Kruger, and Seth Godin, among others.

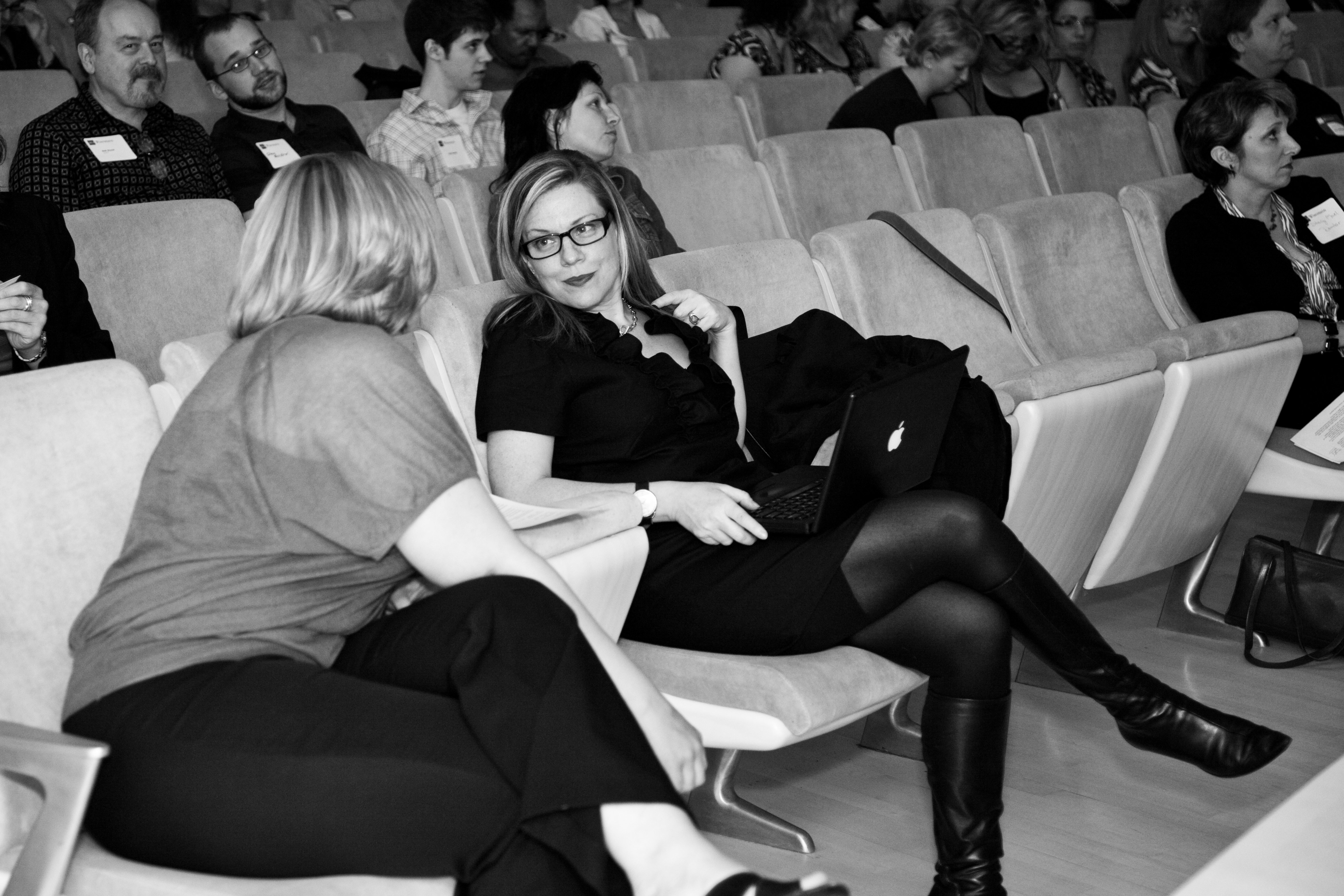
Millman at AIGA Wisconsin, 2009

In 2009, Millman and Steven Heller founded a graduate program in branding at the School of Visual Arts in New York City. She serves as chair of the program.

In 2014, Millman became the president emeritus of American Institute of Graphic Arts (AIGA). She is a former board member and treasurer of the New York Chapter.

She designed campaign buttons for Hillary Clinton during her 2016 presidential campaign, wrapping paper and beach towels for One Kings Lane, greeting cards for Mohawk Paper and MOO Paper, as well as playing cards for DeckStarter and various others.

In September 2017, Millman curated a show for the Museum of Design in Atlanta titled Text Me: How We Live In Language, featuring artists and designers including Ed Ruscha, Jean-Michel Basquiat, Shepard Fairey, Neil Gaiman, Deborah Kass, and Lesley Dill. Arts Atlanta called the show a bold first curation. Millman co-curated conferences, such as HOW DESIGN LIVE, the 2017 AIGA National Conference. Since 2013, she has curated 30 Covers, 30 Days for National November Writing Month.

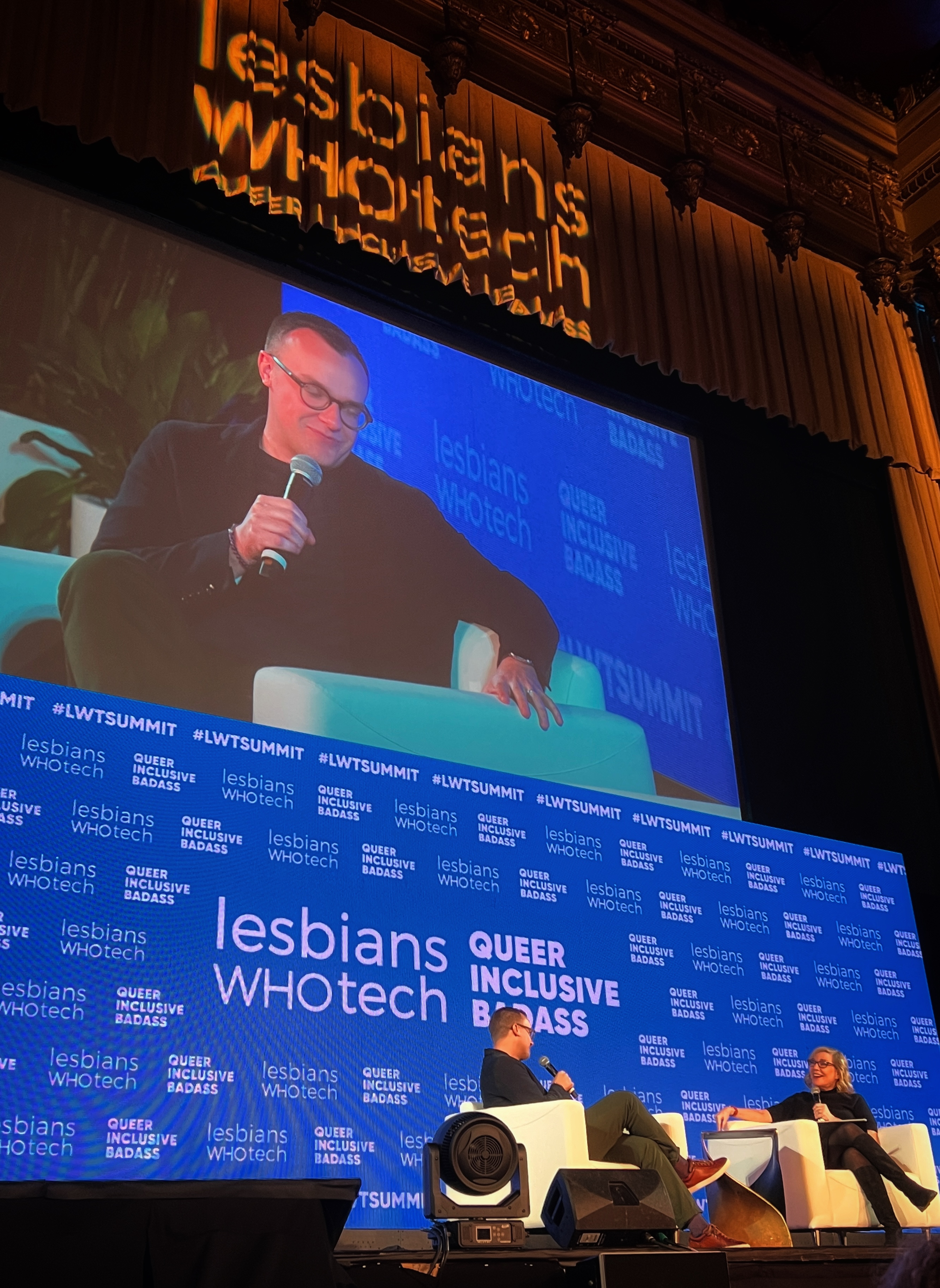
Chasten Buttigieg and Debbie Millman talk during their keynote session at the Lesbians Who Tech & Allies Summit, October 20, 2023

In 2022, Millman appeared on Storybound reading from her new book, Design Matters.

During her career, Millman has written articles for publications such as The New York Times, New York Magazine, Print Magazine, Design Observer and Fast Company.

== Reception and awards ==
Millman's artwork has been exhibited at the Boston Biennale, Chicago Design Museum, Anderson University, School of Visual Arts, Long Island University, The Wolfsonion Museum and the Czong Institute for Contemporary Art. In the past, she was an artist-in-residence at Cranbrook University, Old Dominion University and Notre Dame University, and has also conducted visual storytelling workshops at the Academy of Art University in San Francisco, the University of Utah, Anderson University, Albuquerque Academy, the High School of Art and Design in Manhattan and the Type Directors Club in New York City.

In 2014, she received the Type Directors Club Certificate of Typographic Excellence for her entry in TDC61, 'Austin Initiative for Graphic Awesomeness' poster. Her book Self-Portrait As Your Traitor was awarded a Gold Mobius, a Print Typography Award, and a medal from the Art Directors Club.

Her podcast, Design Matters has received a number of awards, including the Cooper Hewitt National Design Award and the People's Design Award. In 2015, iTunes named it one of the best podcasts of the year. It was recognized as a Webby Honoree in 2018.

In 2021, she was named to Fast Company's Queer 50 list.

Millman's 2019 TED talk, "How symbols and brands shape our humanity", received over 2.4 million views in its first six years. The talk described how symbols and brands spread in both a top-down manner from corporations, and in a bottom-up manner from the people.

== Advocacy ==
Millman was involved with the creation of the NO MORE movement and worked on the team to design a new visual symbol to express universal support for ending domestic violence and sexual assault.

Millman is also on the board of the Joyful Heart Foundation and created the identity for the non-profit with her students at the School of Visual Arts.

== Personal life ==
Millman is married to author Roxane Gay. On July 9, 2020 Gay tweeted that they had already eloped but planned to have a proper ceremony officiated by Gloria Steinem in 2021. She is a lesbian.

== Published works ==
- How To Think Like A Great Graphic Designer. New York: Allworth Press. 2007. ISBN 9781581156355. OCLC 181142646.
- The Essential Principles of Graphic Design. Cincinnati, Ohio: How Books. 2008. ISBN 9781600610479. OCLC 176923189.
- Look Both Ways: Illustrated Essays on the Intersection of Life and Design. Cincinnati, Ohio: HOW Books. 2009. ISBN 9781600613210. OCLC 299713300.
- Brand Thinking and Other Noble Pursuits. New York: Allworth Press. 2011. ISBN 9781581158649. OCLC 696099142.
- Self-Portrait As Your Traitor. Cincinnati, Ohio: HOW Books. 2012. ISBN 978-1440334610. OCLC 865535167.
- Brand Bible: The Complete Guide to Building, Designing, and Sustaining Brands. Beverly, Massachusetts: Rockport Publishers. 2012. ISBN 9781610581981. OCLC 795526435.
- Why Design Matters: Conversations with the World's Most Creative People. New York: Harper Design. 2021. ISBN 978-0062872968. OCLC 1276799504.
