= Creative Boom =

British art magazine

- Founding editor: Katy Cowan
- Categories: Creative industries, design, art, culture
- Frequency: Daily
- Publisher: Creative Boom
- Founder: Katy Cowan
- Founded: 2009; 16 years ago
- Company: Creative Boom Ltd
- Country: United Kingdom
- Based in: Manchester, England
- Language: English
- Website: creativeboom.com

Creative Boom is an art, design and visual culture magazine and website aimed at the creative industries. The UK-based platform includes general articles, industry news, features, tips and inspiration pieces for various creative sectors including advertising, animation, architecture, art and culture, crafts, digital, fashion, film, gaming, graphic design, illustration, photography, product design, and publishing. In addition, it has a podcast and print shop.

== History and growth ==
Creative Boom launched on 24 July 2009 after its Manchester-based founding editor, Katy Cowan, spoke to other freelancers and small businesses on Twitter and realised there was a need for creative support online, particularly for the underrepresented – somewhere people could gain free exposure, support and learn about all things creative. Creative Boom has seven million readers annually.

On 4 November 2011, Creative Boom became part of The Guardian Culture Professionals Network, one of the professional networks available on the newspaper's website, where Katy Cowan would write advice pieces.

On 3 February 2020, Creative Boom introduced The Creative Boom Podcast, featuring conversations with artists and designers. As host, Katy Cowan has interviewed more than 70 guests, including illustrator and author Dapo Adeola, designer and host of Design Matters, Debbie Millman, American graphic designer, writer and educator Gail Anderson, British graphic designer Malcolm Garrett, visual artist and author Oliver Jeffers.

On 11 November 2021, Creative Boom launched its print shop, selling art prints by artists and designers, including Noma Bar, Morag Myerscough, Luis Mendo, Danielle Rhoda, and Rob Lowe of Supermundane.

=== Community ===
On 1 February 2025, Creative Boom launched The Studio, an invitation-based platform where a wide range of creatives including designers, illustrators, animators and digital creators discuss work- and industry-related topics, sharing ideas and support. A variety of events targeting creatives are hosted by Creative Boom, in real life and online.

== Recognition ==
Creative Boom won Best Design Media Award in the international A' Design Award & Competition in 2018. Shopify recommended the website as a resource "dedicated to creative inspiration", while Creative Pool described Creative Boom as a platform for "artists, writers, game designers and more", saying "we'd spend hours playing with those little eyes at the top".

The Creative Boom Podcast was named the number-one podcast for creative career advice and insight by Creative Lives in Progress.
