= END. Clothing =

British clothing retailer

Coordinates: 54.9733°N 1.6156°W

- END. Clothing flagship store at 59 Broadwick Street, Soho, London (opened October 2018)
- Type: Private
- Industry: Fashion retail, E-commerce
- Founded: 2005; 21 years ago in Newcastle upon Tyne, England
- Founders: Christian Ashworth; John Parker
- Headquarters: 133–137 Grainger Street; Newcastle upon Tyne, NE1 5AE; United Kingdom
- Key people: Christian Ashworth (Co-founder); John Parker (Co-founder); Sebastian Suhl (CEO)
- Products: Menswear, sneakers, accessories, lifestyle goods, designer collaborations
- Revenue: approx. £170 million (FY 2020)
- Owner: Apollo Global Management (since 2024)
- Number of employees: approx. 600 (2022)

END. Clothing (stylised as END.) is a British multi-brand retailer specialising in luxury streetwear, contemporary fashion and sneakers. The company was founded in Newcastle upon Tyne in 2005 as an independent store by Christiaan Ashworth and John Parker. Since its founding, END. has expanded from a single boutique to an e-commerce platform with physical stores in the United Kingdom and Europe. In 2021, a majority stake was acquired by the investment firm The Carlyle Group, while the founders retained a minority stake and continued as co-CEOs. In October 2024, Carlyle sold the business to Apollo Global Management.

== Products ==
The retailer is known for its curated selection of over 200 brands, combining established labels with emerging designers, often framed through a British cultural perspective. Initially focused on menswear, END. later expanded its offering to include womenswear and homeware. It stocks global brands including Acne Studios, Comme des Garçons, Nike, adidas, Stone Island and Moncler. The retailer has developed a strong association with sneaker and streetwear culture. The company has collaborated with brands such as adidas, New Balance and Reebok, and frequently releases exclusive sneaker drops and capsule collections. It specialises in limited-edition apparel, contemporary menswear and womenswear, accessories and footwear.

In September 2025, END. launched its own-brand END. LABEL, offering menswear, womenswear, accessories and jewellery across its UK and Milan stores and online.

== History ==
END. was established in 2005 as a two-storey boutique on High Bridge Street in Newcastle, offering a selected range of streetwear and menswear labels alongside sportswear staples. The founders aimed to merge fashion, design, music and art within a modern retail context.

In 2015, END. moved its original Newcastle store to a larger flagship location on Grainger Street, followed by openings in Glasgow (2016), London Soho (2018), Manchester, and the first European flagship in Milan (2024).

Although originally a UK-focused retailer, over 60% of END.’s sales in 2024 came from international markets. The company reports sales in over 100 countries, with key markets including the United States, Canada, Germany, France and Italy. Its online platform receives approximately 10 million unique visitors per month.

In the fiscal year ending March 2024, END. reported revenues of £212.7 million, representing a slight year-on-year decline. The company posted a pre-tax loss of £43.6 million, largely attributed to logistical and operational disruptions following the rollout of a new warehouse stock management system in 2022. EBITDA for the previous financial year declined by 68% to £13 million. Despite the downturn, the company reported improvements in inventory management and logistics efficiency as the revised system stabilised going into 2025.

In 2022, Parker Gundersen (formerly of LVMH) became CEO. He was succeeded in 2025 by Sebastian Suhl, who had joined the board as a non-executive director in September 2024.

In 2025, END. marked its 20th anniversary with a series of events, limited-edition releases and collaborations. The programme centred on three themes of British culture — the seaside, the corner shop and the pub — with collections developed with brands including adidas, Salomon, Crocs, ASICS, Stone Island and PUMA.
