= Mosaiq Group =

Italian packaging manufacturing company

MOSAIQ GROUP S.p.A.
- Type: Public (S.p.A.)
- Industry: Production of sustainable luxury packaging
- Founder: Arca Space Capital, Davide Bulgarelli, Cristiano D'Auria, Loris Moretti, Stefano Bartolini, Antonio Toma
- Headquarters: Via Filippo Turati, 7; 20121 Milan, Italy; 45°28′10″N 09°11′20″E
- Area served: Worldwide
- Key people: Sebastian Suhl (CEO) (2024-2025) Stefano Lazzari (chairman)
- Products: luxury packaging
- Number of employees: (~300 (2024))
- Website: mosaiqgroup.org

Mosaiq Group S.p.A. is packaging group specializing in sustainable products for luxury brands. The group consists of five founding companies: Valtenna, D'Auria Packaging, Bulgarelli Production, CO.RI Sacchettificio, Brand Label, and may expand in the future.

== History ==
Founded through a collaboration of five companies with complementary specialties, Mosaiq Group sells a diverse range of packaging products.

== Operations ==
Mosaiq Group provides services to clients primarily in the fashion, cosmetics, and expensive goods sectors, particularly in Italy and France.

== Products ==
Mosaiq Group’s packaging products include rigid and folding carton boxes, shopping bags, hang tags, paper accessories and micro-packaging, fabric bags and garment covers, and woven labels.
