= Matthew Hoffman (artist) =

American public artist

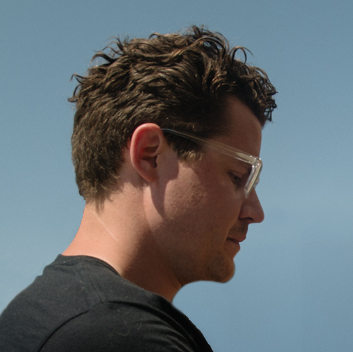
- Born: July 25, 1979 (age 46); Rockford, Ohio
- Education: Ball State University (BA)
- Occupation: Public artist

Matthew Hoffman (born July 25, 1979) is an American public artist and designer based in Chicago. He is known for You Are Beautiful, an art project that ranges from stickers to large-scale public sculptures.

== Early life ==
Matthew Hoffman was born in Rockford, Ohio. In 2001, he earned a Bachelor of Arts degree in graphic design from Ball State University.

== Career ==
=== You Are Beautiful ===
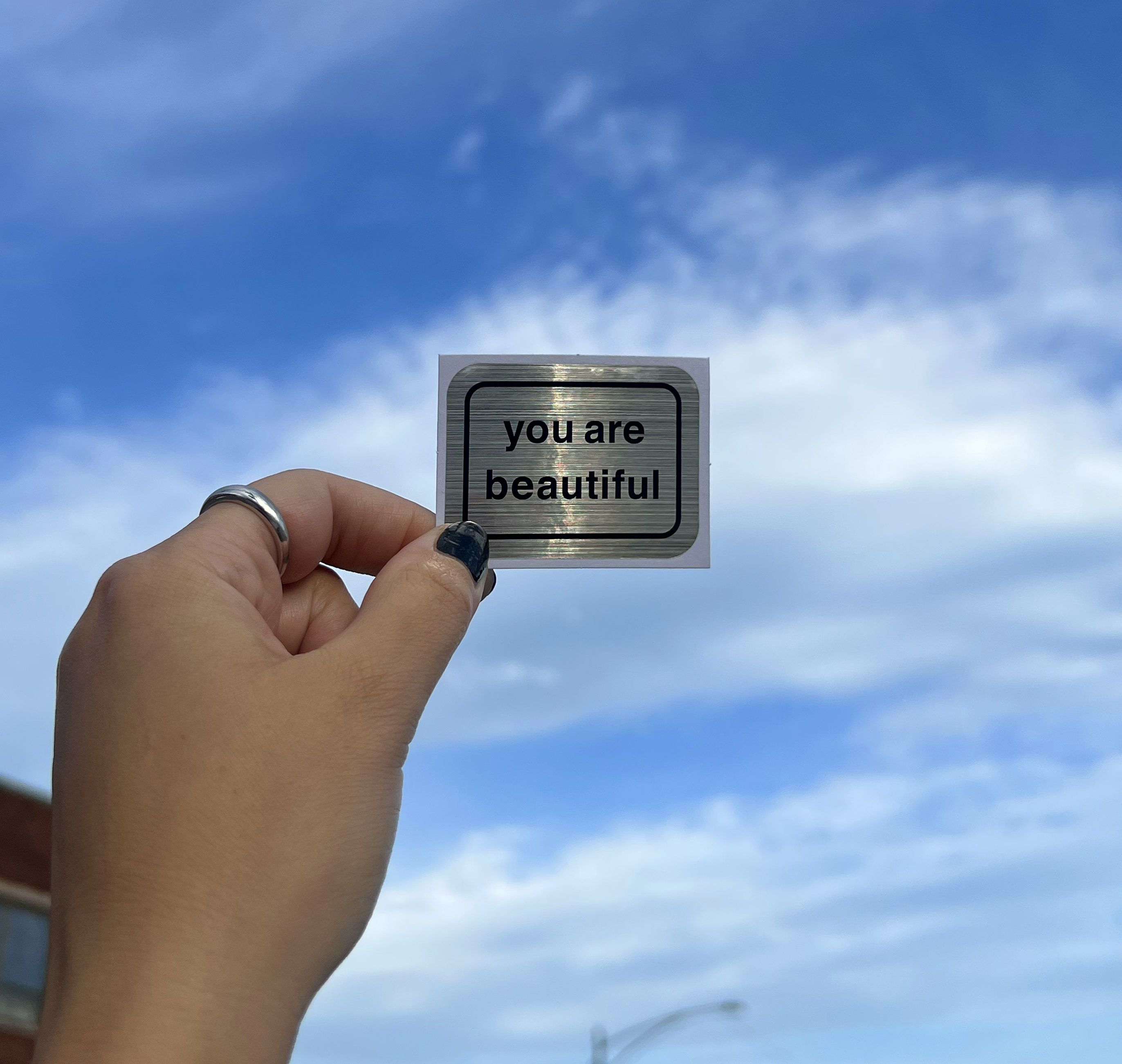
You Are Beautiful Sticker

Hoffman refers to himself as the "custodian" of the You Are Beautiful Project, which began in 2002 as a street art sticker campaign with 100 stickers he distributed to friends, who placed them in public spaces around the world. "The original idea behind the project was just to create a simple, positive, affirming message – just to say 'you are beautiful, you're perfect as you are.' Like, everything's OK," Hoffman said in an interview for OWN's Super Soul Sunday television series.

"I wanted to create the perfect positive message that you could share with everyone," he said in an interview. Initially he remained anonymous, referring to the project as "international collective." Since inception, it is estimated that over 10 million stickers have been distributed in hundreds of languages. The stickers have been posted in locations around the world, on all seven continents.

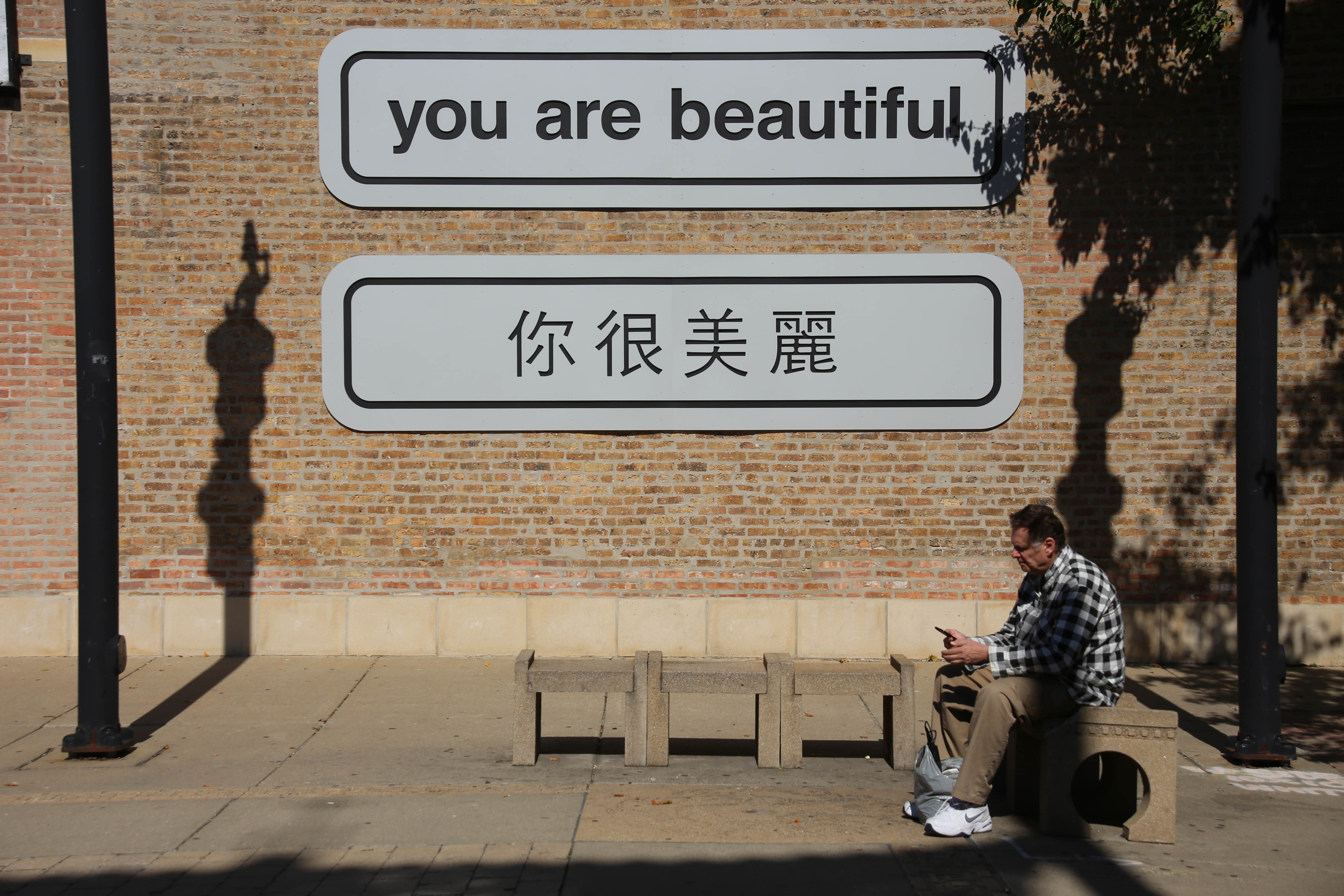
You are beautiful installation in English and Chinese in Chicago's Chinatown neighborhood

In addition to stickers, Hoffman and collaborators have created both commissioned and noncommissioned murals and installations in a variety of media, including paint, plywood and mixed media. In a notable early example, the message is painted at the top of the Rice Mill Lofts in New Orleans, Louisiana. In 2006, Hoffman collaborated with more than 100 local artists to create a temporary installation on the pedestrian pedway wall during construction at Block 37.

There are more than 100 permanent You Are Beautiful public art pieces on display globally, with the greatest concentration located in the Chicago area, such as a billboard-sized replica of a You Are Beautiful sticker erected in 2015 on South Lake Shore Drive in the Oakland neighborhood, installations on fences in Andersonville and Englewood, and on the exterior of the Elmhurst Art Museum in Elmhurst, Illinois. In 2014, the Buffalo AKG Art Museum commissioned a series of billboards placed throughout Erie County featuring a version of the You Are Beautiful sticker design. In 2017, Hoffman launched a successful crowdfunding campaign to place a You Are Beautiful public sculpture in all 50 states.

In 2022, Hoffman was commissioned by shopping mall owner Brookfield Properties to conceive and produce the You Are Beautiful Experience, an interactive exhibit that toured the company's shopping centers in St. Louis, Missouri; Murray, Utah; Las Vegas, Nevada, Frisco, Texas, Atlanta, Georgia; Durham, North Carolina; and Norwalk, Connecticut.

In 2023, You Are Beautiful produced an edition of stickers in braille. "Every single person deserves to be treated with kindness and compassion, and be reminded of their value and worth. At the heart of the You Are Beautiful project is to constantly be innovating to find ways to interject positivity into daily life for everyone," Hoffman said.

=== Other works ===
Hoffman's work typically depicts words or phrases rendered in two- or three-dimensional text, often in a cursive font based on the artist's handwriting.

In 2015, real estate brokerage and technology firm @properties commissioned Hoffman to paint a mural on its Chicago headquarters. The mural features the word "love" in a cursive script based on Hoffman's handwriting. The design was turned into magnets and other promotional items for the company, and was incorporated into a new mural by artist Lefty Out There in 2021.

In 2016, Hoffman installed a sculpture titled May This Never End along the fence of the Rose Kennedy Greenway in Boston. The piece was recognized as one of the best public artworks of the year in the Americans for the Arts' Public Art Network Year in Review. The full text of the piece reads:

Nothing's for keeps. Except that we must keep going. You'll spend your entire life searching, ok? We all want to belong. So let's all get along. Make the most, and hope. May this never end.

The Arts Commission of Greater Toledo commissioned a sculpture for its 2019 Momentum arts festival. The sculpture features the phrases "You Are Beautiful" on one side and "You Are Doing Great" on the other. After the festival concluded, the sculpture was moved to a permanent location in International Park in downtown Toledo.

Hoffman was commissioned during the COVID-19 pandemic quarantine in 2020 to create a series of sculptures featuring the phrase "We're all in this together," which were placed on 24 buildings in Chicago. In 2021, a sculpture featuring the phrase "You got this" was installed at the Roosevelt Collection Shops in the South Loop neighborhood of Chicago.

Hoffman opened a studio and gallery in the Avondale neighborhood of Chicago in 2018, where You Are Beautiful art, retail products and other artworks are displayed.

== Exhibitions ==
=== Selected solo exhibitions ===
- 2019: Wandering Through Words, The Collective, Lafayette, CO
- 2017: YAB Culture, Galerie F, Chicago, IL
- 2017: Find Your Way, Workshop 4200, Chicago, IL
- 2016: From Here, St. Ambrose University Gallery, Davenport, IA
- 2013: The Next Chapter, Rare Device, San Francisco, CA
- 2011: Hey, Yes Gallery, Cincinnati, OH
- 2010: No One Knows How Deep This Goes, Wonder Fair, Lawrence, KS
- 2009: When All Is Said & Done, Possible Projects, Brooklyn, NY

=== Selected group exhibitions ===
- 2017: Dibs, Havas Gallery, Chicago, IL
- 2016: ChicagoMade: Great Ideas Of Humanity, World Business Chicago & Design Museum of Chicago, Hong Kong, China
- 2015: The Great Create, Nasher Sculpture Center, Dallas, TX
- 2015: Play, Toledo Museum of Art, Toledo, OH
- 2014: CHGO DSGN, EXPO Chicago, Chicago, IL
- 2014: Work at Play, Design Museum of Chicago, Chicago, IL
- 2012: Share Your Beauty, Mission Cultural Center, San Francisco, CA
- 2012: Museum Of Temporary Art, See Line, Los Angeles, CA
- 2011: Write Now: Artist and Letterforms, Chicago Cultural Center, Chicago, IL

== See also ==
- Public art
- Street art
