= Design Matters =

Interview podcast

Presentation
- Hosted by: Debbie Millman
- Genre: Design
- Language: English
- Updates: Weekly

Publication
- Original release: 2005; 20 years ago
- Provider: Observer Omnimedia

Related
- Website: designobserver.com/podcast-design-matters.php

Design Matters is a podcast founded and hosted by American writer, educator, artist, and designer Debbie Millman. Founded in 2005, Design Matters is considered "the first and longest running podcast about design". It is now hosted on Design Observer, which is published in partnership with AIGA. Debbie Millman has interviewed over 250 guests including Amanda Palmer, Chris Ware, Malcolm Gladwell, Massimo Vignelli, Steven Heller, Marian Bantjes, Tina Roth Eisenberg, Alain de Botton, Alison Bechdel, and Stefan Sagmeister.

Design Matters won a Cooper Hewitt National Design Award in 2011 and was named one of iTunes Best Podcasts of 2015. The podcast has also been on top of the charts by a number mainstream media publications, such as Business Insider, HGTV, Architectural Digest.

== Format ==
Design Matters is hosted by Debbie Millman and features personable, in-depth conversational interviews with "industry-leading graphic designers, educators, authors, change agents and thinkers". Episodes are published approximately 30 times a year and generally range in length from 25 to 60 minutes. The show ends with the signature tagline, "And remember: We can talk about making a difference, we can make a difference, or we can do both."

== History ==
The podcast began in 2005 as an internet talk radio show airing on the Voice America Radio Network. After the first 100 episodes, Design Matters began to be published by Design Observer, a design website. In September 2020, it was announced that Design Matters would be joining the TED podcast family.

== Awards ==
As of January 2023, Design Matters has won 11 podcast industry honors and 4 wins, including the 2023 Webby for Best Creativity and Marketing Podcast. The show has also been named an iTunes Best Podcast of the Year (2015). In 2011, Design Matters won a Cooper Hewitt National Design Award.

== See also ==
- 99% Invisible
