= Trussardi =

Italian fashion company

- Type: Private
- Industry: Fashion
- Founded: 1911
- Founder: Dante Trussardi
- Headquarters: Milan, Italy
- Key people: Alberto Racca (CEO)
- Website: www.trussardi.com

Trussardi (pronounced [trusˈsardi]) is an Italian fashion house based in Milan, Italy, specializing in leather goods, ready-to-wear clothing, perfumes, and accessories.

Founded in 1911 as a leather glove manufacturer, Trussardi expanded its product line in the 1970s under Nicola Trussardi, who succeeded his uncle. In the 1980s, the company introduced ready-to-wear clothing, perfumes, and jeans. By the 1990s, Trussardi had become an international brand, with key markets in Italy and Japan.

Since 2024, Trussardi has operated as part of the Miroglio Group, a fashion and retail company founded in 1947.

== History ==
=== Early days ===
Trussardi was established in 1911 by Dante Trussardi as a leather glove maker, serving both the public and the Italian army during World War II. After Dante's death, his son Giordano took over. In 1970, Nicola Trussardi succeeded his father following the accidental death of his brother Dante. Nicola's wife, Marialuisa, became the creative director. During the 1970s, Trussardi diversified into other leather goods and apparel, adopting the Italian greyhound as its logo. Nicola took full control of the business after his father's death.

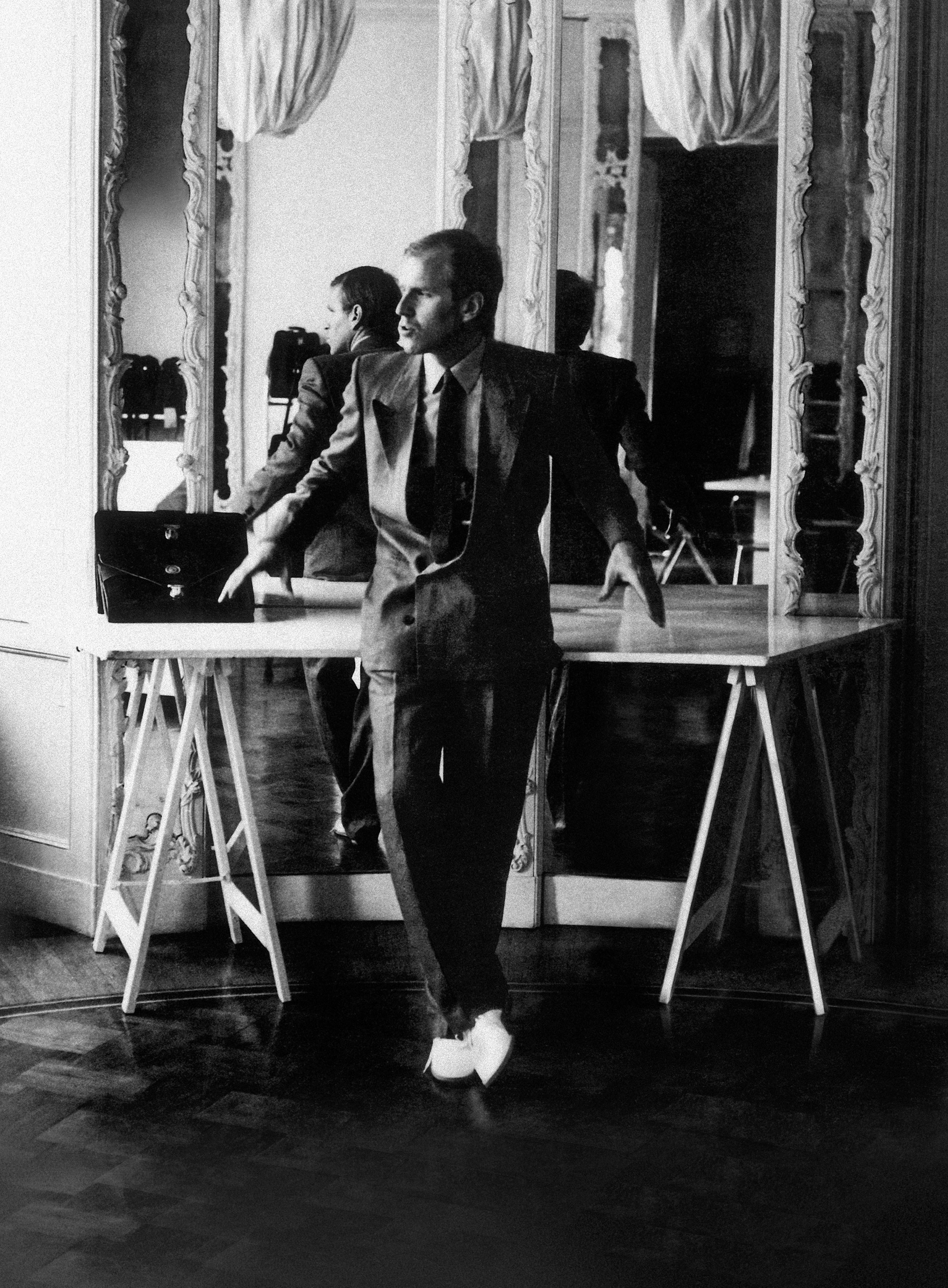
Nicola Trussardi in 1982

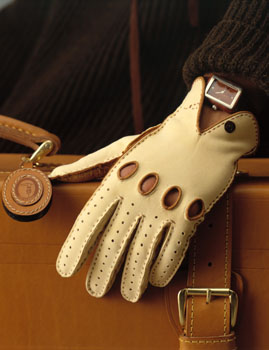
An iconic model of Trussardi's leather gloves

=== Expansion ===
The first perfume "Trussardi" launched in 1980, followed by "Trussardi Uomo" in 1983. The women's ready-to-wear line debuted in 1983, with men's ready-to-wear in 1984 and Trussardi Jeans founded in 1986. The brand added sport and home lines and by 1985 operated 120 stores worldwide. It also created interior designs for private aircraft and helicopters.

Around this time, Trussardi entered the US market, with sections in department stores in addition to boutiques, and initial franchise locations in Beverly Hills, Atlanta, Miami, and San Francisco. The first Bloomingdales location opened in 1985, with opera singer Luciano Pavarotti in attendance for the grand opening. In 1989, the company launched its first eyewear line. In 1993, the company opened a research and development center in Brindisi, which initially focused on raw material research, new fabrics, and changing packaging to be more environmentally friendly. The three initial lines for the collection were Trussardi Sport, Jeans, and T-store, each produced by the company Sosab—owned by Nicola Trussardi and operating out of Modena, Italy. The T-Stores started in 1996 and sold the company's lifestyle line: jeans, sports lines, bicycles, tableware, and confections. The first three stores opened in 1995 in Bangkok, Hong Kong, and Seoul. The company's first New York City store opened in 1996. That year, the turnover for the company, including licenses, was $530 million. They also opened a new store in Milan within Nicola Trussardi's redeveloped Marino Alla Scala across from the La Scala opera hall. By this time the company had seven fragrances, with about one third of fragrance sales being done in Europe and two-thirds abroad.

In 1998, Trussardi launched a new eyewear line, with both prescription and sun glasses. In 1992, Trussardi licensed its Trussardi Levriero and Trussardi Action lines to the Japanese company C. Itoh for about $1.4 billion over five years. At the time, Japan accounted for about 70% of the company's total exports out of Italy, and there were about 200 Trussardi Levriero stores in the country. Following its partnership with C. Itoh, Nicola Trussardi founded Teijin Ltd, intending it to be Trussardi's long-term partner in the country. In 2003, Trussardi took on Mitsui as its partner in Japan, ending its relationship with Teijin.

=== 2000s and beyond ===
After Nicola Trussardi's death in 1999, his son Francesco became chairman, while his daughter Beatrice took on a leadership role. After her brother's death in 2003, Beatrice became president and CEO of the fashion house, staying president until Maria Luisa Trussardi took over the position. In 2006, the brand hired Eric Wright, who had previously designed for Fendi, to be the house's head designer. In the same year, Trussardi Alla Scala Restaurant was opened, becoming one of the three restaurants in Milan to have been awarded two Michelin stars, which it held until 2015. In 2008, Trussardi launched the super high-end line of brand Trussardi dal 1911, designed by Milan Vukmirovic. In 2011, Trussardi released the home décor collection MY Design, named for the initials of industrial designer Michael Young and inspired by Trussardi's designs of the 1980s and 1990s.

In 2011, Umit Benan Sahin became the label's creative director, and in 2013, Sahin was replaced by Gaia Trussardi. Prior to becoming creative director for the mainline collections, Gaia had already served as the creative director for Tru Trussardi and Trussardi Jeans. For the 40th anniversary of their logo, Yuko Shimizu produced an animated short film entitled "Sky Watcher". In 2017, Trussardi launched its latest men's fragrance Riflesso. Said to have ambrosial wafts of woody and oriental notes. In April 2018, Gaia Trussardi stepped down as creative director of the fashion house.

In February 2019, the asset management company Quattro R acquired 60% of Trussardi. A few months later, Maela Mandelli (former PVH director) was named CEO of the company. Then in October 2020, Sebastian Suhl was named CEO of Trussardi. In May 2021, Benjamin Huseby and Serhat Işık were named creative directors Trussardi.

In 2023, the company underwent a crisis restructuring procedure at the Milan Court. The members of the Board of Directors, CEO Sebastian Suhl, and the two creatives Serhat Işık and Benjamin A. Huseby, resigned.

In March 2024, Trussardi was acquired by the Miroglio Group and now operates as an independent brand under the leadership of CEO Alberto Racca. The acquisition aims to fuse Trussardi's elegance and versatility, attributes that have long defined the brand, with a modern customer-centric approach that embraces contemporary lifestyles and values.

== Collections, partnerships and licenses ==
=== Collections ===
Trussardi is the collection line of the fashion house, which designs clothing and accessories for both men and women.

Past collections

- Tru Trussardi was the house's more casual collection, with its own stand alone stores. Tru Trussardi releases clothing and accessories. As part of the corporate restructuring carried out in 2016, the Tru Trussardi line was closed.
- Trussardi Jeans is the denim line for the fashion house, founded in 1986. The line produces casual wear for both men and women.

=== Partnerships ===
In 2011, to celebrate the maison's centenary, Trussardi collaborated with BMW Italia to launch a limited edition of the BMW 5 Series Gran Turismo. That same year, the brand also partnered with MOMODESIGN to produce a special leather helmet.

During the 2013–2014 season, Trussardi began designing off-field uniforms for Juventus Football Club.

In 2014, the brand and Samsung Electronics Italy joined forces for a limited edition of covers for the Galaxy Note 4 and Galaxy S5 smartphones, as well as the Galaxy Tab S 10.5 tablet.

In 2015, Trussardi partnered with Coca-Cola to release its first limited-edition collection of bottles and cans in celebration of the brand's 100th anniversary.

In 2016, the brand teamed up with Dynamiq Yachts to customize the interiors of the Dynamiq D4 Jetsetter model, through Trussardi Casa.

In 2019, Trussardi and Fiat presented the Limited Edition "Panda Wears Trussardi," a co-branding project aimed at combining the urban-chic elegance of the fashion house with the functionality of the Italian car. The protagonist of the advertising campaign was the singer Ava Max, who wore iconic Trussardi pieces to shoot the music video for her single "Torn."

=== Licenses ===
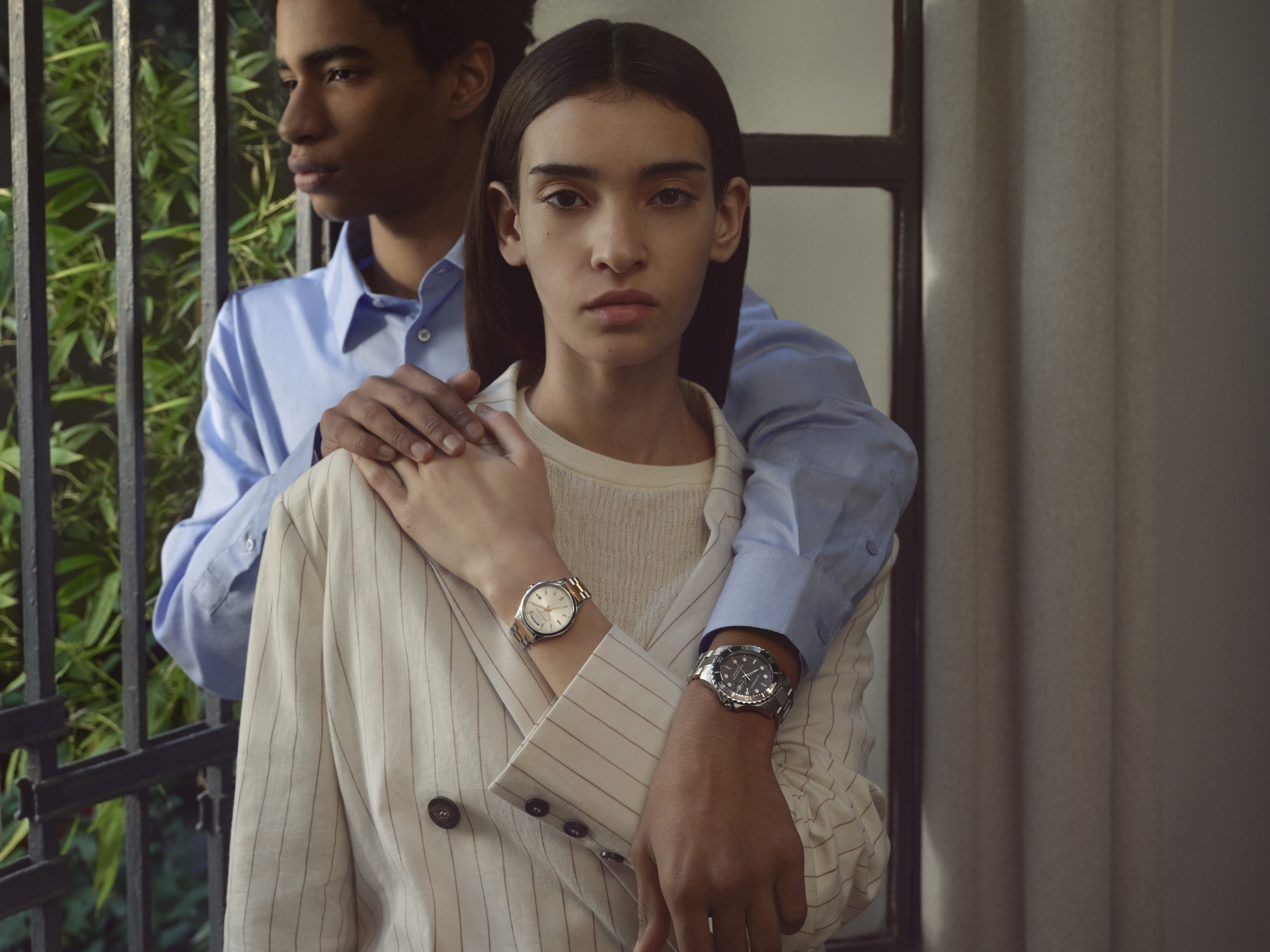
Trussardi Orologi

In 1983, Trussardi Junior, the children's clothing line of the maison, was launched for the first time. In 2009, Trussardi licensed the management of the brand, both in terms of production and distribution, to Idea and, since 2013, to the Italian company Pinco Pallino. In 2016, the partnership with Brave Kid (of OTB group) began with the first autumn/winter 2017/18 collection. Since 2020, the license for Trussardi Junior collections has been entrusted to Arav Fashion Group.

In 2010, Trussardi entered into a licensing agreement with Charmant for the design, production, and distribution of the eyewear line, which transferred to De Rigo in 2015. Since 2022, Trussardi continues to produce its own line of eyeglasses and sunglasses, together with GO Eyewear.

The Trussardi Parfums line, known for the iconicity of its fragrances, is currently developed by Angelini Beauty, the brand's licensee since 2012.

In 2014, a partnership was signed with Morellato for the launch of the Swiss production line Trussardi Orologi, and subsequently, in 2022, for Trussardi Jewels.

A collaboration with Manifattura di Valduggia S.p.A. began in 2014 for the creation of Trussardi Beachwear, Underwear, and Nightwear. In 2022, the license for the Beachwear line was entrusted to AREA B.

In 2014, a licensing agreement was signed with Club House_ Luxury Living Group, marking the birth of Trussardi Casa, on the occasion of the Milan International Furniture Fair. In 2015, in collaboration with Zambaiti Parati SPA, the distribution of Trussardi Wall Decor products began. In 2023, Trussardi and Luxury Living Groups announced the new project Trussardi Residences, the result of a partnership with MIRA Developments, with the creation of the first fully furnished residential complex Trussardi Casa in Dubai. Phase II was launched in 2025, featuring two residential towers and additional facilities.

In 2016, Trussardi partnered with Lardini to launch Trussardi Elegance, a men's formalwear line, inaugurated in Milan with the Fall/Winter 2017–18 collection.
