= TeuxDeux =

- Developers: Swissmiss and Fictive Kin
- Initial release: April, 2009
- Operating system: Web-application
- Type: Task management software
- Website: teuxdeux.com

TeuxDeux is a Web and iPhone based task management application produced by a collaboration between Swissmiss and Fictive Kin. According to PC World the visual layout of the application facilitates the Getting Things Done system of task management. The application is considered notably useful by Lifehacker and Gizmodo.

According to the developer's website, the backend of the app is written in Ruby, with Sinatra serving pages and Grape delivering the API. The front end is built on Spine.js.
