= CreativeMornings =

Global creative community and lecture series

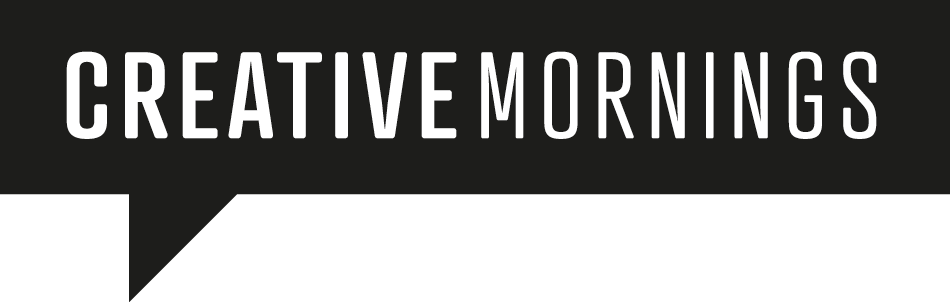
- Formation: October 11, 2008; 18 years ago
- Founder: Tina Roth Eisenberg
- Type: Private
- Purpose: community
- Headquarters: Brooklyn, New York
- Location: Worldwide
- Website: creativemornings.com

CreativeMornings, or Creative Mornings, is a free monthly breakfast lecture series and design salon designed for creative communities. In 2008, Tina Roth-Eisenberg founded the lecture series in Brooklyn, New York as an ongoing, accessible event for New York's creative community. The series is based on the concept: "breakfast and a short talk one Friday morning a month. Every event would be free of charge and open to anyone."

Lecturers include professional creators, designers, photographers and illustrators. As of 2025, CreativeMornings hosts events in 238 cities (chapters) worldwide in over 65 countries. Their events are run by approximately 1,500 volunteer organizers.

== History ==
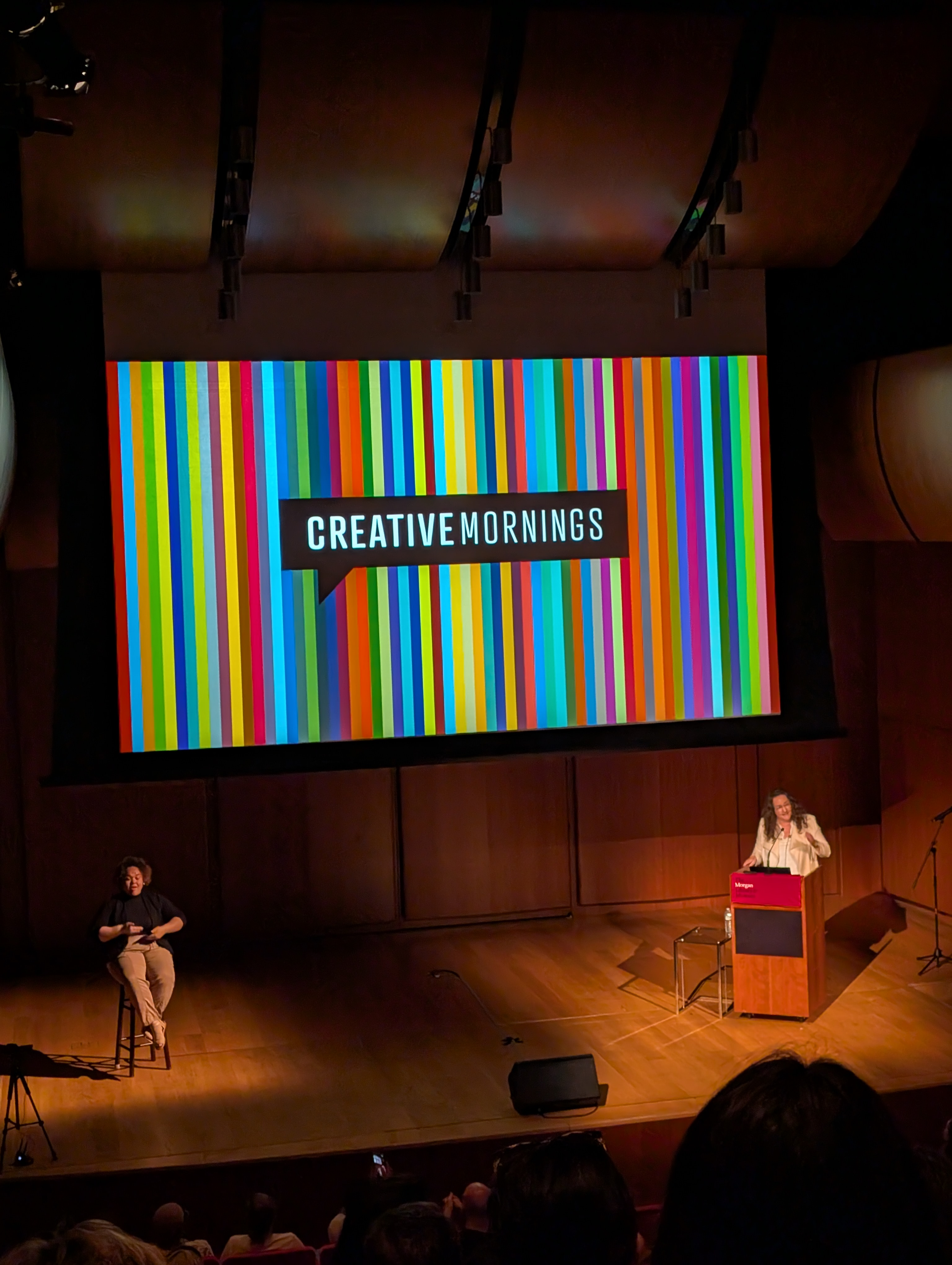
Opening remarks by Tina Roth Eisenberg at the June 2025 event in New York City

Tina Roth-Eisenberg delivered a talk at a 99U conference in New York City talking about inviting creative professionals to a weekly gathering to start building "the community [she] wished existed when [she] moved to New York and didn't know a soul." In 2008, Tina founded CreativeMornings in Brooklyn, New York. It was founded to facilitate creative communities and provide a space for people to share and discuss their work.

CreativeMornings has since grown out to other cities around the world. The lecture series expanded to Zurich, Switzerland and Los Angeles, California in 2010. In February 2011, San Francisco established a CreativeMornings chapter. That July, the lecture series expanded to the United Kingdom. CreativeMornings partnered with John Maeda, President of the Rhode Island School of Design and its STEM to STEAM initiative to host a series of unified events in May 2012. Louisville, Kentucky established a CreativeMornings chapter that December. It was the 101st city to join the organization.

In 2024 at the annual Adobe MAX conference, it was announced that Adobe became a global partner with CreativeMornings.

== Manifesto ==
Every event includes a guest reading of the manifesto:

Everyone is creative.

A creative life requires bravery and action, honesty and hard work. We are here to support you, celebrate with you, and encourage you to make the things you love.

We believe in the power of community. We believe in giving a damn. We believe in face-to-face connections, in learning from others, in hugs and high fives.

We bring together people who are driven by passion and purpose, confident that they will inspire one another, and inspire change in neighborhoods and cities around the world.

Everyone is welcome.

== Locations ==
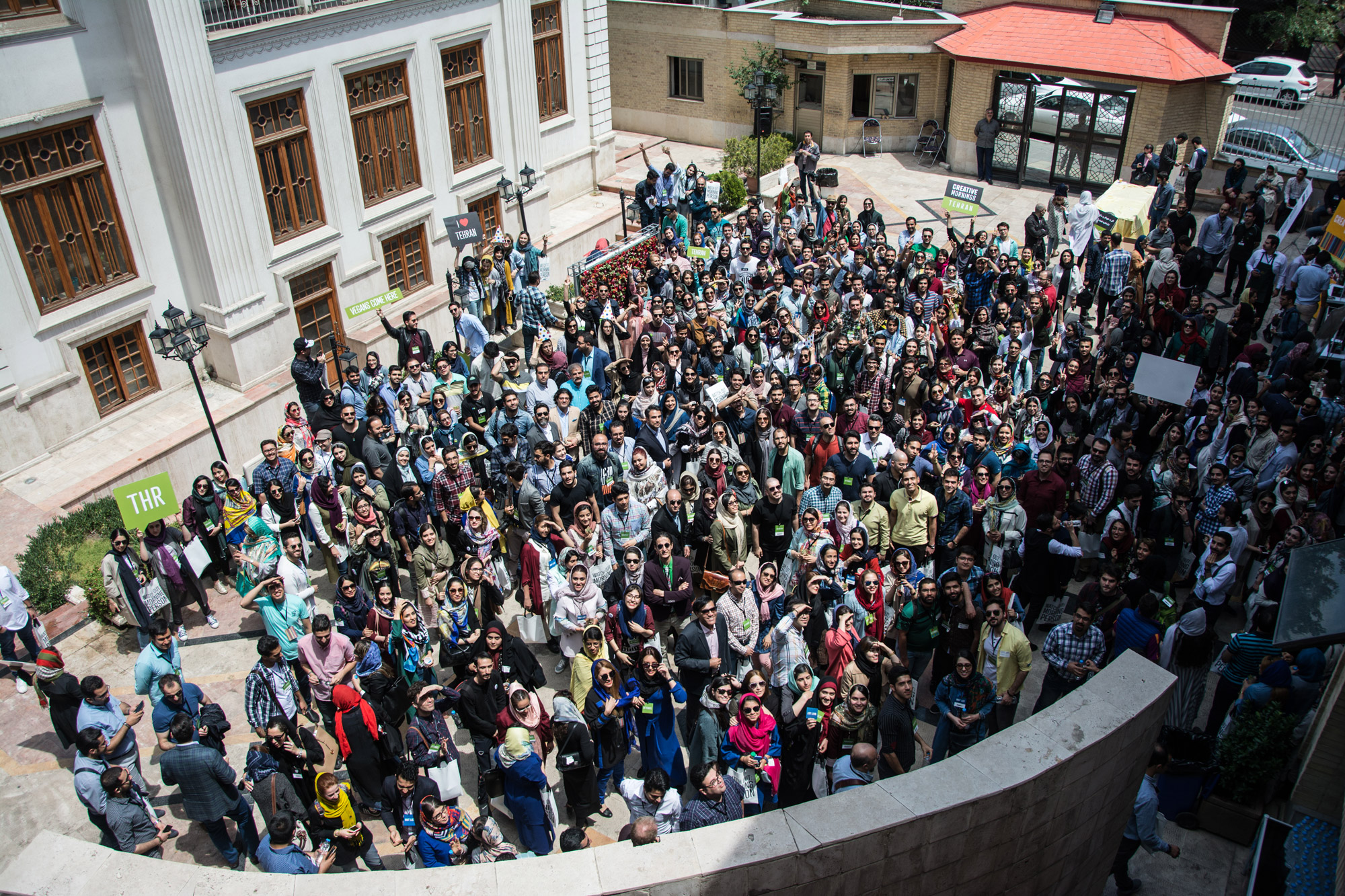
Photo of 11th Event in Tehran

CreativeMornings has chapters in over 215 cities worldwide including New York City, Boston, Paris, Zurich, Berlin, Trondheim, Lagos, Mexico City, Milan, Montevideo, Bangkok, Hanoi, Tabriz, Seoul, Sydney, Singapore, Lagos, Bogotá, Tehran, Isfahan and Cape Town. Each chapter is produced and led by a local host organizer with the support of local volunteer organizers.

== Events ==
Lectures are held on a Friday morning once a month that includes breakfast and a short talk. The goal of CreativeMornings is to host a city's creative community and encourage conversation while being inspired by a guest speaker. To highlight local attendees, "30-Second Pitches" is an activity where any attendee can sign up to give a 30-second pitch on stage about their company or themselves.

Each month, all chapters align across a common theme, of which the topics range from education, anxiety, chaos, urbanism, bravery, and food. Presentations are filmed and archived online for public access.

== Reception ==
CreativeMornings has been described as "the best place to spend your Friday morning" that helps in "bringing community together, sharing ideas, and expanding your world". A local Hampton Roads' magazine, VEER Magazine, interviewed a first-time attendee saying they "love the idea of starting the morning with people and a jolt of energy and ideas" and would be "happy to go again". Moreover, the magazine comments that CreativeMornings is an appropriate platform to "promote and encourage people to highlight [creative entrepreneurs and these amazing cultural professionals] as an assert of our region". A local chapter like in St. Petersburg, Florida can be "pretty intimate" with 200 attendees where "you can make eye contact with everybody". The St. Petersburg community aims to "actively make the events more diverse" by choosing "people who might be novice speakers" because well-rehearsed talks make the event feel "less of a conversation."

Ramel Wallce, a CreativeMornings host notes that events can "help get people to the next step in their industry or career".

Highlighted in Forbes, attending community events like Meetup and CreativeMornings has been suggested as intentional ways to recover from burnout if being with community is an activity that positively impacts an individual.
