= Tina Roth-Eisenberg =

Swiss designer based in Brooklyn, New York

Tina Roth Eisenberg
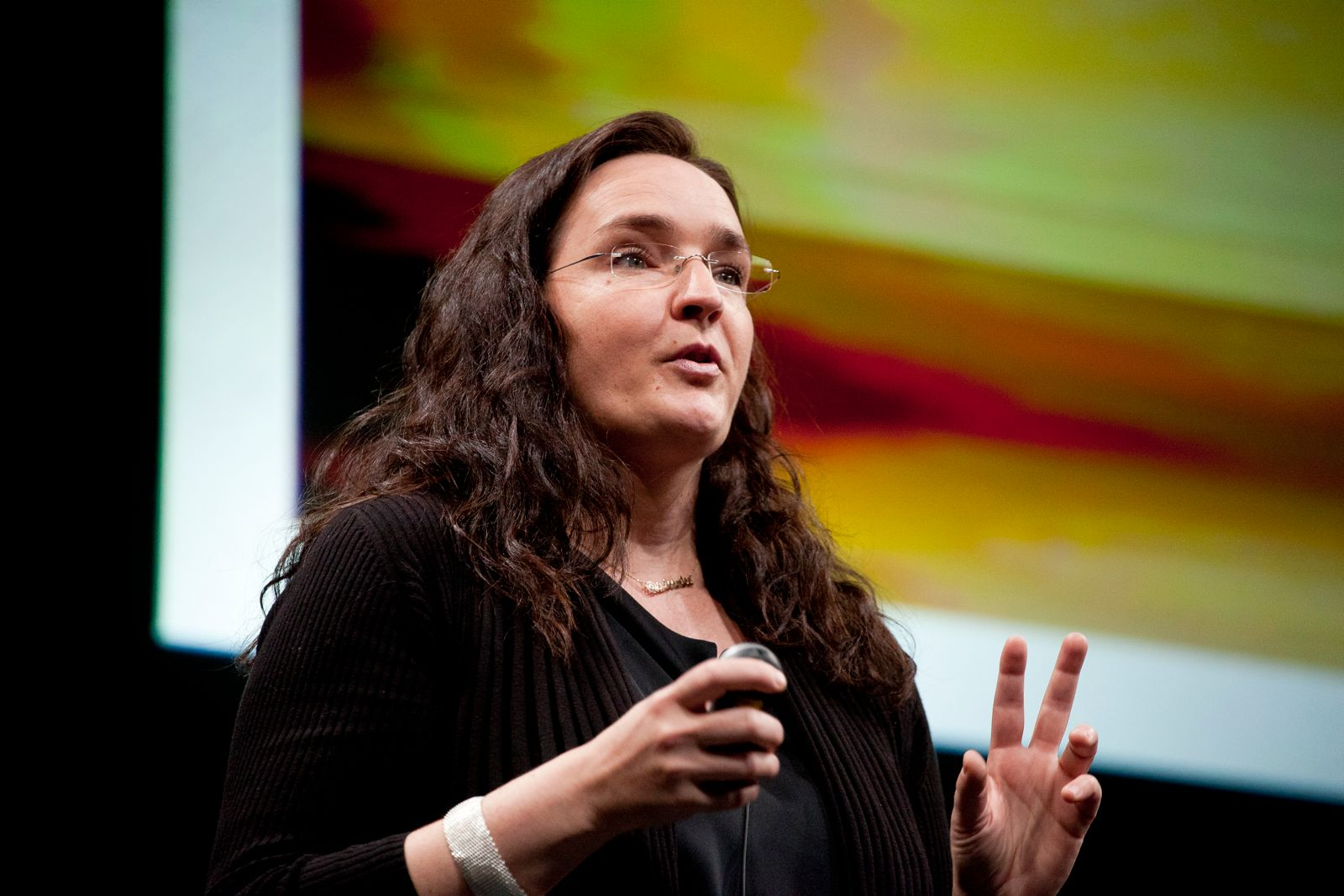
- Eisenberg in 2012
- Born: Speicher, Switzerland
- Occupation: Designer
- Children: 2
- Website: www.swiss-miss.com

Tina Roth Eisenberg is a Swiss designer based in Brooklyn, New York. She is best known for founding the Swiss Miss design blog and studio (stylized as "swissmiss" and "swiss-miss"). She is also the founder of Friends Work Here, CreativeMornings, TeuxDeux and Tattly.

== Biography ==
Tina Roth Eisenberg was born and raised in Speicher, Switzerland. After high school in Trogen she studied communication design in Geneva, Switzerland and Munich, Germany and earned her degree in 1999.

In 1999, Tina Roth Eisenberg took an internship at a small design studio in New York City. After three months, she accepted an offer for a full-time job at the studio. Tina founded CreativeMornings, a monthly lecture series, in October 2008. The lecture series receives 100 to 500 attendees and extends to over 196 cities worldwide. In 2008, Roth Eisenberg became a Design Director for Plumbdesign (which became Thinkmap and was rebranded by Roth Eisenberg). She founded swissmiss, a design blog and studio, in 2005.

Roth Eisenberg created TeuxDeux, a to-do app, with her studio mates Cameron Kozcon and Evan Haas. In 2008, Eisenberg opened Studiomates, a co-working space. She founded CreativeMornings, an international breakfast lecture series in 2008. Additionally, she is the founder and CEO of Tattly, a design temporary tattoo startup. Eisenberg was featured as a keynote speaker at South by Southwest (SXSW) in 2013 and at Adobe MAX in 2017. That year, GDUSA included her on its list of People To Watch. In 2014, Eisenberg served as mentor for Shopify’s Build a Business Competition. In April 2015, she opened Friends Work Here, a co-working space in Boerum Hill, Brooklyn.
