= Business of Design Week =

Business of Design Week (BODW) is an annual week-long design event organised every December by the Hong Kong Design Centre. BODW was launched in 2002. It includes a design conference, forums, seminars, exhibitions and award presentations.

BODW annually invites designers, business leaders and educators to speak and share their opinions in various forums. Past speakers include Marcel Wanders, Rem Koolhaas, Raman Hui, Rossana Hu, Richard Hutten, Zaha Hadid, Tom Dixon, Michael Young, Jimmy Choo, Sir John Sorrell, Karim Rashid, Ross Lovegrove, Marc Newson, and Vivienne Tam.

Each year, BODW forms a partnership with a different country. The country is invited to bring a group of designers to Hong Kong to give presentations at the conference. The country can also hold exhibitions and seminars about its national design.

BODW has main events which occur each year including the BODW Forum where designers give presentations. There is also the HKDC Award Gala Dinner where the HKDC Awards are presented. These awards include the Design for Asia Awards, the World’s Outstanding Chinese Designer Award, the Design Leadership Award, the Design for Asia Award, and the Hong Kong Young Design Talent Awards. Alongside Knowledge of Design Week (KODW).

== Past BODW ==
	Partner City/Country	Theme
2025	Italy	Curiosity Ignites Design Innovation
2024	France	Inter/Section:Design, Artistry and Innovation
2023	The Netherlands	Game Changers
2022	The Netherlands	Design for Change
2021	United Kingdom (Strategic Partner)	Global Design Reset
2020	United Kingdom (Strategic Partner)	Vision 20/21
2019	United Kingdom	Design the Future, Create Tomorrow
2018	Melbourne	"Think ∙ Collaborate ∙ Create"
2017	Italy	Italy makes a difference
2016	Chicago	ChicagoMade
2015	Barcelona	BARCELONA INSPIRES]
2014	Sweden	Living Design: Live it. Work it. Do it.
2013	Belgium	Belgian Spirit
2012	Denmark	Design Society Denmark
2011	Germany	Brand New Germany
2010	Japan	Lost and Found
2009	France	France Forward
2008	The Netherlands	Open Minds
2007	Italy	–
2006	United Kingdom	Designs for Life
2005	Scandinavia	LifeStyleAsia
2004	Sweden	LifeStyleAsia
2003	–	LifeStyleAsia
2002	–	Solution
