= Santa Catalina School =

Private school in Monterey, California, US

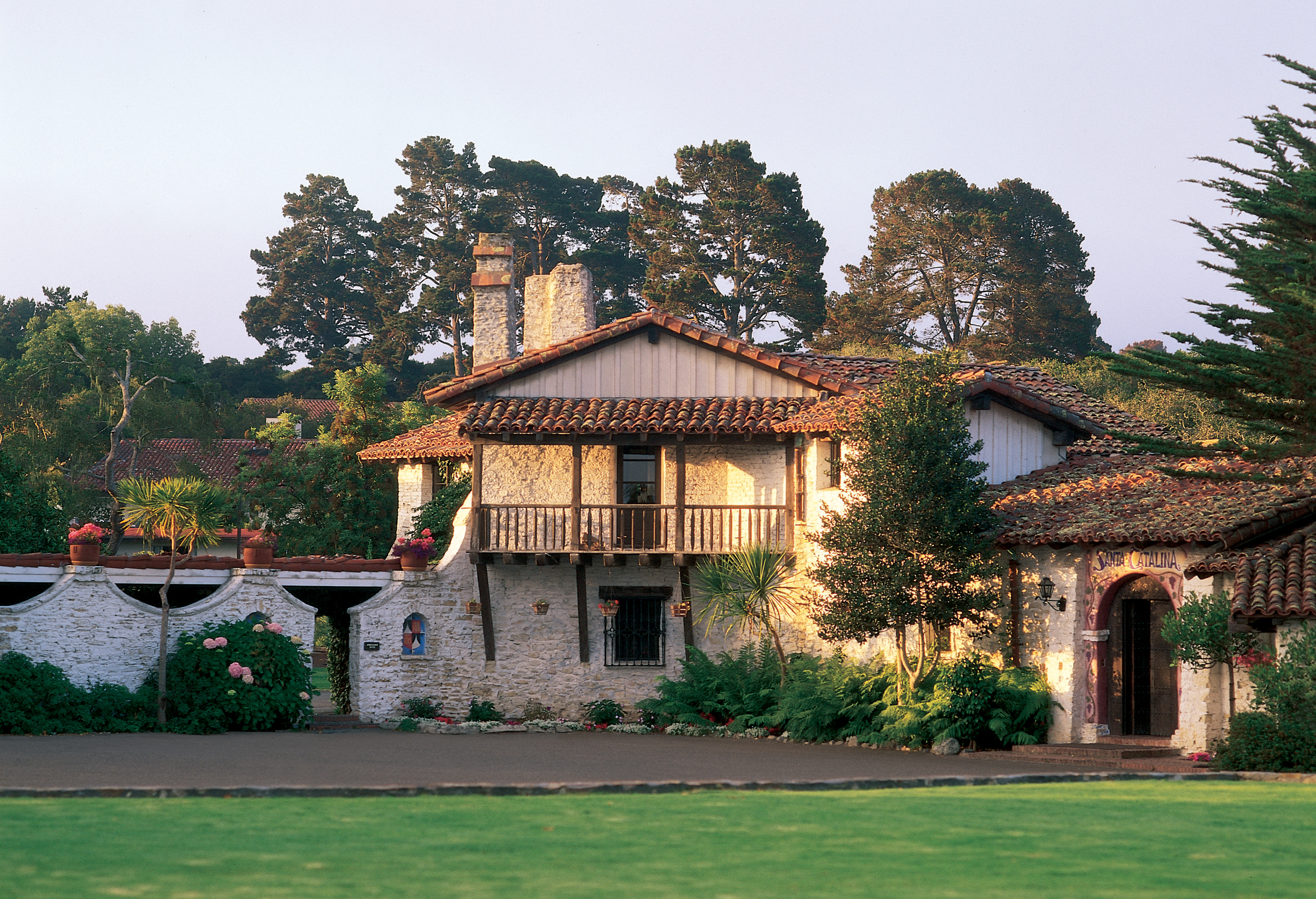

Location
- 1500 Mark Thomas Drive; Monterey, Monterey County, California 93940; United States; 36°35′33″N 121°52′7″W

Information
- Type: Private, day and boarding school
- Motto: Veritas (Truth)
- Religious affiliation: Catholic
- Established: 1850 (original school); 1950
- Founder: Sister Margaret Thompson
- Head of school: Barbara Ostos
- Grades: PreK-12
- Gender: Girls (9-12); Coed (PreK-8)
- Campus: Suburban
- Campus size: 36 acres
- Colors: Blue and Gold
- Slogan: Do well. Do good.
- Athletics conference: CIF – Central Coast Section
- Mascot: Cougar
- Team name: Cougars
- Rival: Stevenson School
- Accreditation: WASC; California Association of Independent Schools
- Publication: Moasic (literary magazine)
- Newspaper: The Lamplighter
- Yearbook: Catalinian
- Endowment: $44 Million
- Affiliation: The Association of Boarding Schools, The National Coalition of Girls Schools
- Website: www.santacatalina.org

Santa Catalina School is a private school in Monterey, California, United States, founded by Sister Margaret Thompson and the Dominican Order in 1950. Situated on a 36-acre hacienda-style campus, the Upper School is an all-girls boarding school that also accepts local students. The Lower and Middle School serves both boys and girls (preschool through 8th grade). Students are required to wear uniforms. The school emphasizes building a sense of community that challenges its students mentally and spiritually. Santa Catalina is accredited by the California Association of Independent Schools and the Western Association of Schools and Colleges. In addition, the school is associated with the National Association of Independent Schools, the Association of Boarding Schools, National Catholic Educational Association, and the National Coalition of Girls' Schools.

== History ==
=== Ranch beginnings and religious background ===
The original Santa Catalina Convent was founded by Sister Marie Geomaere, a Dominican sister, in what is now downtown Monterey in 1850, when Monterey was the capital of California. With the help of Rev. Joseph Alemany, O.P., Bishop of Monterey, she created the first Catholic school in California, excluding mission schools. Students were predominantly daughters of local town residents and of nearby Spanish landowners and classes were taught in Castilian Spanish. In 1854 the school was moved to Benicia, the new state capital, where it was renamed St. Catherine's Academy.

In 1950, Sister Margaret Thompson, Mother General of the Dominican Sisters of San Rafael, California, decided to reestablish Santa Catalina in Monterey. After buying the 36-acre campus from a local cattle rancher, Col. Harold Mack, the school opened in the fall of 1950, with Sister Mary Kieran as the first principal. When Sister Kieran died in 1965, Sister Carlotta became principal, a title she held for 35 years. As principal, Sister Carlotta's goal was to "educate the whole child... by guiding young people toward intellectual attainment and social, physical, and spiritual well-being."

=== Transition to co-education and new leadership ===
Boys were allowed to enroll in preschool and kindergarten at the request of Sister Jean, and Sister Carlotta encouraged male students to continue their education at the school through 8th grade.

Sister Claire, after serving as Head of Upper School since 1982, became Head of School in 2002. Sister Claire and Sister Christine still reside on campus, though both are now retired.

Margaret K. Bradley became Head of School in 2016 upon the retirement of Sister Claire. Margaret Bradley retired in June 2022. Upon her retirement, Dr. Barbara Ostos became the fifth Head of School.

== Current statistics ==
=== Lower and middle school ===
==== Enrollment ====
There are 238 students in the Lower and Middle School; 61 percent are girls and 39 percent are boys.

==== Class size and student-teacher ratio ====
Class sizes are generally small, but vary by grade level as follows:

Basic class information
Grade level	Students	Teachers	Student-teacher ratio
Pre-K	20	3	8:1
Kindergarten	24	2	12:1
Grades 1 & 2	24	2	12:1
Grades 3-5	24	1 teacher and 1 assistant	12:1
Grades 6 - 8	18 per section 2 sections per grade	1 teacher per subject	5:1

==== Tuition ====
Tuition varies by grade level, and the school offers need-based financial aid. Below is tuition and financial aid information for the 2010-2011 school year.

- Pre-K: $14,500
- Kindergarten: $22,750
- Grades 1-8: $24,750
- 42 percent of students receive financial aid.

=== Upper school ===
==== Enrollment, class size, and student-teacher ratio ====
As of August 2019, there were 216 girls enrolled at Santa Catalina: 113 were boarding students and 103 were day students. International students made up 19% of the student body. The average class size was 12 students, and the student-teacher ratio was 8:1.

==== Tuition ====
Upper School tuition varies between resident and day students, and both need and merit-based financial aid are offered.

- Boarding: $59,000 for the 2019-20 school year
- Day: $38,250 for the 2019-20 school year
- 42% of students received financial aid for the 2019-20 school year.

== Education and academics ==
=== Mission ===
Santa Catalina Lower and Middle School "encourage[s] each boy and girl to work effectively, to communicate articulately, [and] to approach life with a sense of purpose and competence" and prepares students for secondary schooling.

Santa Catalina School aims to "combine a rigorous liberal arts curriculum, modern educational technology, and solid Christian principles" to prepare its students for college and beyond. The single-sex environment, Catholic background, and college preparatory courses are emphasized to "teach the importance of becoming leaders in our communities by serving others." The school attempts to develop each girl's abilities and emphasizes balancing intellectual growth with spiritual awareness. Santa Catalina also seeks diversity in order to enhance a student's sense of responsibility to her community and herself.

=== Requirements ===
- 4 years of English
- 3 years of math, foreign language, religious studies, lab sciences, and arts
- Extracurricular activities are required for each of the three athletic seasons. Students have a choice each season between sports, performing arts (theater, dance, and music), and physical education.

=== Admission ===
Santa Catalina accepts students on the basis of academic achievement and personal qualification "without regard to race, creed, color, or national and ethnic origins." The admissions office requires a questionnaire and writing sample, school transcript, teacher recommendations, parent statements, SSAT scores, an interview, and an optional personal recommendation. Non-native English speakers are required to take the TOEFL.

=== Departments ===
Academics are divided among the following departments: Art, Drama, English, Foreign Language (including French, Spanish, and Mandarin Chinese), History, Math, Music, Religion, and Science.

=== Honors and AP opportunities ===
Santa Catalina School offers 11 Advanced Placement and 7 Advanced Topics courses.

=== College counseling and acceptance ===
The school has two college counselors on campus who work closely with seniors and assist with students' college applications and SAT and ACT registration. In addition, the school has an online resource for students called Naviance, which provides further college counseling. In addition, approximately 65 colleges and universities from within the United States and abroad send representatives to Catalina to discuss their schools with students throughout the academic year. The average SAT score of students is 1732. 100% of graduates attend college and within the past five years the most-attended colleges were UC Davis (20 students), UCLA (11 students), Boston University (11 students), New York University (9 students), and Loyola Marymount University (9 students).

=== Lower and middle school academics ===
From kindergarten to fifth grade, students take courses in art, computer studies, language arts, math, music, physical education, religion, science, and social science. Spanish classes are introduced in the 4th grade. In grades 6 – 8, students take classes in art, computer science, English, foreign language (Spanish), history, math, music, physical education, religion, and science.

=== Faculty and administrators ===
Despite the school's religious background, the current administrators are laypeople and not affiliated with a religious order.

- Head of School - Dr. Barbara Ostos,
- Assistant Head of School for Mission and Identity - John Murphy, Ph.D.
- Head of Upper School - Julie Lenherr Edson ’88
- Head of Lower and Middle School, PreK–Grade 8 - Maria Canteli

The Upper School is ranked among the top 20 boarding schools for faculty education because a high percentage of the faculty has advanced degrees.

== Facilities ==
- Aquatic center

In 2003 a new outdoor aquatic center was completed, featuring a 25 yard by 30 meter pool that is connected to the gym's locker rooms. This 10-lane pool is used for physical education classes and the Upper School's swimming and diving and water polo teams. The pool was renovated beginning in 2018 and was unveiled for the second time in the spring of 2019. It is now fully functional.

- Bedford Family Gymnasium Complex

Located next to the pool, the gym houses basketball and volleyball courts, bleachers, and dressing room facilities. PE classes and Upper and Lower School basketball and volleyball teams use the facility. The gym overlooks the pool and a regulation size softball and soccer field, which is encircled by an all-weather track. In addition, the gym is adjacent to 6 regulation size tennis courts, including one lighted court with stadium seating.

- Dormitories

Resident students live in one of three dorms in either a single or double room, with faculty members living on each floor. Each room has a bed, desk, drawers, and lockable closet and there are common bathrooms for each floor. The dorms also come "equipped" with wireless internet, laundry facilities, and vending machines.

Thompson Dormitory — This dorm is used primarily for freshman and some sophomores, and also has faculty housing.

Greer Family Dormitory — This is the dorm that was built most recently and houses sophomores, juniors, and faculty.

Hills Hall — For seniors and faculty.

- The Hacienda

Originally the Upper School classroom building, this 70-year-old building now houses the Upper School Admissions Office, Business Office, and Development Office.

- Mary L Johnson Music Center

This building houses a 150-seat recital hall, a dance studio, and music studios for private lessons. The building is primarily used for student music lessons and recitals.

- Rosary Chapel

The chapel is located in the center of campus and was built in 1954 as a donation from by Mrs. Marcia Ferrell Hart. San Francisco architect Germano Milono was commissioned to design the building. One of the most notable features is the chapel's stained glass windows. Today the chapel is used for weekly morning prayer offered for all students and faculty, weekly masses for resident students, on-campus faculty, and the public, as well as special events.

- Santo Domingo Hall

This building includes the student health center and the dining hall. The school uses Bon Appétit food services, who were the winners of the National Resource Defense Council's 2009 Growing Green Award for their commitment to sustainable food. Their menus often feature locally grown foods and leftovers are composted. Although their vegetarian and vegan options are often limited to the daily salad bar.

- Sister Mary Kieran Memorial Library

Finished in 1967, the library holds about 34,000 volumes, 40 in-house periodicals, 500 media items, online databases, and 30 computers for students and teachers. It is used by both Upper and Lower Schools. The library staff are inconstant, and although the library is the only place with low volume and adequate couch space, rules constitute no napping.

- Sister Carlotta Performing Arts Center

The Performing Arts Center is a 500-seat, state of the art theater that is used for Lower School Spring and Christmas concerts, various recitals, and three Upper School performances every academic year. The Performing Arts Center also hosts the B.R.E.A.L. show (a performance put on by the student-run performing arts clubs) and Evening of the Arts (an arts showcase at the end of the year).

- Study Hall

Upper School assembly is conducted every morning in this building. Desks are provided for every student and are arranged by class. There are also a limited number of lockers available for student use. Because of the small size of the lockers, the difficulty in reaching them, and the limited number, students prefer open crates under their desks.

== Student life ==
=== Athletics ===
==== Middle school ====
Competitive sports are offered, but not required, for students in grades 6 - 8. Teams compete by grade level with other public and private schools in the area.

Seasonal athletic teams
Fall	Winter	Spring
Volleyball	Basketball	Tennis
Soccer	Flag football	Golf
		Track and field

==== Upper school ====
Students can choose to participate in one sport per season. Teams compete in the Pacific Coast Athletic League (PCAL) and the CIF / Central Coast Section (CCS). The volleyball, basketball, tennis, soccer, water polo, lacrosse, field hockey, and softball teams compete at both the varsity and junior varsity levels.

Seasonal athletic teams
Fall	Winter	Spring	Year round
Volleyball	Basketball	Swimming and diving	Equestrian
Tennis	Soccer	Track and field	
Water polo		Lacrosse	
Field hockey		Softball	
Cross country			
Golf			

=== Performing arts ===
Students may also participate in theatre or dance, rather than athletic teams, after school.

- Theatre: In addition to offering drama classes, the school presents two musicals and one drama each year, which students can choose to participate in.
- Dance: Dance classes are offered in ballet technique, jazz, contemporary, and musical-theater tap.
- Music: In addition to the required extracurricular athletics or performing arts, private musical and vocal lessons are available to students. There are also school-wide recitals and a school choir.

=== Community service ===
- Upper School - Each class has a day designated for mandatory community service. Students choose between the following sites: Dorothy's Place, St. Vincent de Paul Thrift Store, Salvation Army Youth Center, Ave Maria Convalescent Center, Ag Against Hunger, Gateway Center, Harbor Project, STAR Riders, and Food Bank of Monterey County. Certain sites are also offered for students two afternoons each week.
- Lower and Middle School - The entire Lower and Middle School is involved in one community service project each month.

=== Student clubs ===
Student clubs
Academic / school support	Activism	Entertainment	Sports / outdoors	Social	Student government (all students are elected to these positions)
Spanish Club	Amnesty International	Accents (advanced dance club)	Fencing Club	Back to Basics (cooking and sewing club)	Student / Faculty Senate
French Club	Community Service Club	ECCO! (A Capella Group)	Fit Club	Dumbledore's Army (Harry Potter enthusiasts)	Resident Council
PEMDAS (Math Club and Peer Tutoring)	Operation Smile	Lamplighter (student newspaper issued 7 times a year)	Journey: Jump Outside Until Real Nature Experiences You (outdoor club)	Fashion Club	Day Student Council
Admission Tour Guides and Class Guides	Pax Christi	MOSAIC (literary magazine)	Scuba Club	Great Indulgences (art, literature, and film club)	Prefects
Big / Little Sisters (seniors who help freshman ease into their first year)	R4: Reduce, Reuse, Recycle, Restore (environmental club)	Reverb (singing and songwriting club)	Geocachers	Knit Wits (knitting club)	
Catalinan (Yearbook)	Model UN / UN Student Alliance			Tokyo Drift (Japanese club)	
STAR (Student - alumni organization)	Animal Welfare				

== Notable alumnae ==
- Kathleen Brown, 1994 California gubernatorial candidate; daughter of former Governor Edmund G. "Pat" Brown; sister of former California Governor Jerry Brown
- Maryedith Burrell, film and television producer, writer, actress and documentarian
- Angelique Cabral, actress, star of CBS's Life in Pieces
- Ninive Clements Calegari, educator and co-founder of 826 Valencia, The Teacher Salary Project and Enterprise for Youth
- Leslie Cockburn, journalist, producer, director, writer; co-producer of The Peacemaker with George Clooney
- Claire Coffee, actress, star of NBC's Grimm
- Abigail Folger, coffee heiress, civil rights activist
- Sharon Gless, actress, best known for 1980s crime drama Cagney and Lacey
- Jennifer Grant, actress, daughter of Cary Grant and Dyan Cannon
- Patricia Hearst, newspaper heiress, former member of Symbionese Liberation Army
- Dakota Johnson, actress, best known for her role in the Fifty Shades franchise (attended one year)
- Jessica Koehne, nanoscientist at NASA
- Monica C. Lozano, publisher and CEO of the Spanish language La Opinión newspaper in Los Angeles
- Brita Sigourney, three time Olympian and 2018 Bronze medalist in her specialty of skiing
- Kathleen Sullivan, first woman anchor at CNN
