= Spells Writing Lab, Inc. =

Philadelphia, Pennsylvania, USA based 501(c)(3) non-profit organization

Spells Writing Lab, Inc. (formerly Spells Writing Center, Inc.) a.k.a. (“Spells”) is a Philadelphia, Pennsylvania, US-based 501(c)(3) non-profit organization. Founded in 2009, the organization provides creative and expository writing programs for school-age students and professional development for teachers.

Spells was inspired by the model established by 826 National an organization started by Nínive Calegari and Dave Eggers.

== History ==
Spells was founded in January 2009 by Jill Schiller with the support of Christina Rose Dubb, Josh Freely, Caroline Tiger, Jared Von Arx, Jennifer McCreary and Steven Wittenberg, was officially recognized as a charitable organization by the Commonwealth of Pennsylvania on April 29, 2009 and received its 501(c)(3) status on February 4, 2010. Spells is currently located on the campus of the Village of Arts and Humanities in North Philadelphia. Writing workshops began in June, 2009, writing intensive summer camp, established June, 2010 and after school tutoring established February, 2011. To date Spells has conducted over 70 individual programs.

Spells has partnered on writing initiatives with organizations such as the Mayor’s PhillyGoes2College project, Painted Bride Art Center, Fairmount Art Center, Mural Arts Project and local bookstores to provide free programming throughout Philadelphia.

== Programs ==
Spells offers the following programs:

- After-school drop-in tutoring;
- Weekend writing workshops;
- 6 week writing intensive summer camp;
- Spring break writing camp;
- In-school assistance with student publications;
- Partnerships with non-profits;
- Professional development for teachers;
- School field trips (pending).

== Volunteer Network ==
Spells is supported by a network of volunteers which includes authors, journalists, poets, teachers, documentary filmmakers, attorneys, PHDs and MBAs. The volunteer staff as of October, 2012 includes, Christina Rose Dubb, Executive Director and Elizabeth Encarnacion, Programming Director.

Spells has attracted support in the form of sponsors, Board of Directors and Advisory Board support from local literary and cultural superstars such as New York Times bestselling authors Elizabeth Gilbert (Eat, Pray, Love), Lisa Scottoline, Jennifer Weiner (In Her Shoes) and Buzz Bissinger (Friday Night Lights: A Town, a Team, and a Dream). Additional support comes from other notable public figures such as Tigre Hill (filmmaker), Christina Pirello (author and TV personality), Carol Saline (author), Lori L. Tharps (author), Diana Rodriquez Wallach (author), and Seth Williams (District Attorney). Spells provides college level internship/co-op programs through Ursinus College, Drexel University, Haverford College, Temple University and urban public high school students. These internships provide apprenticeship-style opportunities with local literary professionals through personalized interactions and mentorship.
