= The Best American Nonrequired Reading 2008 =

- Editor: Dave Eggers and introduced by Judy Blume
- Cover artist: Barry McGee
- Language: English
- Series: The Best American Nonrequired Reading
- Media type: Print (hardback & paperback)
- Preceded by: The Best American Nonrequired Reading 2007
- Followed by: The Best American Nonrequired Reading 2009

The Best American Nonrequired Reading 2008, a volume in The Best American Nonrequired Reading series, was edited by Dave Eggers and introduced by Judy Blume. The works anthologized are selected by high school students in California and Michigan through 826 Valencia and 826michigan.

== Works included ==
Work	Source	Author
"Y"	Indiana Review	Marjorie Celona
"The White Train"	Virginia Quarterly Review	J. Malcolm Garcia
"The Dreamer Did Not Exist"	Oxford American	David Gessner
"Darkness"	Zoetrope	Andrew Sean Greer
"The Hotel Malogo"	Virginia Quarterly Review	Helon Haliba
"The Three Paradoxes"	The Three Paradoxes	Paul Hornschemeier
"Neptune's Navy"	The New Yorker	Raffi Khatchadourian
"Ayana"	The Paris Review	Stephen King
"Queen of the Scottish Fairies"	www.nytimes.com	Ruth Modan
"Searching for Zion"	Transition	Emily Raboteau
"Bill Clinton, Public Citizen"	GQ	George Saunders
"Cake"	The Kenyon Review	Patrick Tobin
"Where We Must Be"	Indiana Review	Laura van den Berg
"Pearls Before Breakfast"	The Washington Post	Gene Weingarten
"The Elegant Rube"	Open City	Malerie Willens
