= American Teacher =

- Directed by: Vanessa Roth; Brian McGinn
- Produced by: Ninive Calegari, Dave Eggers, Vanessa Roth
- Narrated by: Matt Damon
- Cinematography: Daniel B. Gold, Steve Milligan, Rich White, Arthur Yee
- Edited by: Brian McGinn
- Music by: Thao Nguyen
- Production company: First Run Features
- Distributed by: Gravitas Ventures
- Release dates: May 3, 2011 (San Francisco Film Festival); September 30, 2011 (United States)
- Running time: 81 minutes
- Country: United States
- Language: English
- Box office: $33,144

American Teacher is a 2011 documentary film co-directed by Vanessa Roth and Brian McGinn and produced by The Teacher Salary Project. It follows the format of the book Teachers Have It Easy: The Big Sacrifices and Small Salaries of America’s Teachers.

== Synopsis ==
American Teacher uses a large collection of teacher testimonies and contrasts the demands of the teaching profession alongside interviews with education experts and education reform news from around the country. There are four principal characters in the film whose lives and careers are closely portrayed over the course of several years. Alongside the stories of these four characters is interwoven a mixture of interviews with teachers, students, families, and education leaders, as well as animation conveying startling facts surrounding the teaching profession.

== Production ==
The film is a compilation of over three years of collecting footage from hundreds of teachers across the country. Outside of the main characters, the film also features vignettes and interviews with many other public school teachers as well. American Teacher also features interviews with US Secretary of Education Arne Duncan, Deputy Secretary of Education Brad Jupp, the founder of The Equity Project Charter School Zeke Vanderhoek, Stanford Professor of Education Dr. Linda Darling-Hammond, Stanford economist Eric Hanushek, and several regional and national teachers of the year. The film is produced by Ninive Calegari, Dave Eggers, is produced and directed by Academy Award-winning filmmaker Vanessa Roth, and co-directed and edited by filmmaker Brian McGinn. The film is narrated by actor Matt Damon with music composed by San Francisco musician Thao Nguyen.

== Screenings ==
The film American Teacher held its premiere screening on May 3, 2011 at the 54th Annual San Francisco International Film Festival to a sold-out audience. It was followed by an additional screening in San Francisco on May 5, another sold-out preview screening in Los Angeles on May 6 at the Creative Artists Agency as well as a Washington D.C. preview screening at the Jack Morton Auditiorium on May 24. American Teacher has also received the silver award in the documentary category of the 34th Annual Philadelphia International Film Festival. The film was theatrically released in major United States cities in September 2011.
