= The Best American Nonrequired Reading =

Annual literary anthology selected by American high school students

The Best American Nonrequired Reading was a yearly anthology of fiction and nonfiction selected annually by high school students in California and Michigan through 826 Valencia and 826michigan. The volume was part of The Best American Series and was initially edited by Dave Eggers. In the editor's note to the 2013 volume, Eggers stated that the 12th edition would be his last as editor. The 2014 volume was edited by Daniel Handler, a.k.a. Lemony Snicket. The 2019 was the last volume as it has been discontinued by Houghton Mifflin Harcourt.

== Series summary ==
The Best American Nonrequired Reading
Year	Edition	Editor	Series Editor	Introduction	Cover Artist
2002	1st	Dave Eggers		Dave Eggers	J. Otto Seibold
2003	2nd	Dave Eggers		Zadie Smith	Daniel Clowes
2004	3rd	Dave Eggers		Viggo Mortensen	Adrian Tomine
2005	4th	Dave Eggers		Beck	Tony Millionaire
2006	5th	Dave Eggers		Matt Groening	Art Spiegelman
2007	6th	Dave Eggers		Sufjan Stevens	Carson Ellis
2008	7th	Dave Eggers		Judy Blume	Barry McGee
2009	8th	Dave Eggers		Marjane Satrapi	Banksy
2010	9th	Dave Eggers		David Sedaris	Maurice Sendak
2011	10th	Dave Eggers		Guillermo del Toro	William Joyce
2012	11th	Dave Eggers		Ray Bradbury	Brian Selznick
2013	12th	Dave Eggers		Walter Mosley	Camille Rose Garcia
2014	13th	Daniel Handler	826 National	Lemony Snicket	Roman Muradov
2015	14th	Adam Johnson	826 National	Adam Johnson	Eric Nyquist
2016	15th	Rachel Kushner	826 National	Rachel Kushner	Jillian Tamaki
2017	16th	Sarah Vowell	826 National	Sarah Vowell	Kenard Pak
2018	17th	Sheila Heti	826 National	Sheila Heti	Tommi Parrish
2019	18th	Edan Lepucki	826 National	Edan Lepucki	Molly Egan

== See also ==
- The Best American Nonrequired Reading 2007
- The Best American Nonrequired Reading 2008
