= The Best American Nonrequired Reading 2007 =

Volume 6 of an anthology by Dave Eggers

- First edition
- Editor: Dave Eggers and introduced by Sufjan Stevens
- Cover artist: Carson Ellis
- Language: English
- Series: The Best American Nonrequired Reading
- Media type: Print (hardback & paperback)
- Preceded by: The Best American Nonrequired Reading 2006
- Followed by: The Best American Nonrequired Reading 2008

The Best American Nonrequired Reading 2007 is the sixth annual volume in The Best American Nonrequired Reading anthology series. It is edited by Dave Eggers, introduced by Sufjan Stevens, and has cover art by Carson Ellis. It contains nineteen short pieces of fiction and non-fiction by various authors.

== Works included ==
Work	Source	Author
"Middle-American Gothic"	Spin	Jonathan Ames
"A Happy Death"	Fun Home	Alison Bechdel
"Ghost Children"	Creative Nonfiction	D. Winston Brown
"Rock the Junta"	Mother Jones	Scott Carrier
"American"	New Orleans Review	Joshua Clark
"What is your dangerous idea?"	Edge Foundation	Edge Foundation
"Selling the General"	Five Chapters	Jennifer Egan
"Where I Slept"	Tin House	Stephen Elliott
"Loteria"	Indiana Review	Kevin A. Gonzales
"How to Tell Stories to Children"	Zoetrope	Miranda July
"Adina, Astrid, Chipewee, Jasmine"	The New Yorker	Matthew Klam
"All Aboard the Bloated Boat"	Barrelhouse	Lee Klein
"Love and Honora and Pity and Pride...."	Zoetrope	Nam Le
"Darfur Diaries"		Jen Marlowe, Aisha Bain & Adam Shapiro
"The Big Suck"	Virginia Quarterly Review	David J. Morris
"Stuyvesant High School Commencement Speech"		Conan O'Brien
"Humpies"	Agni Online	Mattox Roesch
"So Long, Anyway"	Epoch	Patrick Somerville
"Literature Unnatured"	American Short Fiction	Joy Williams
