= Mark Scharenbroich =

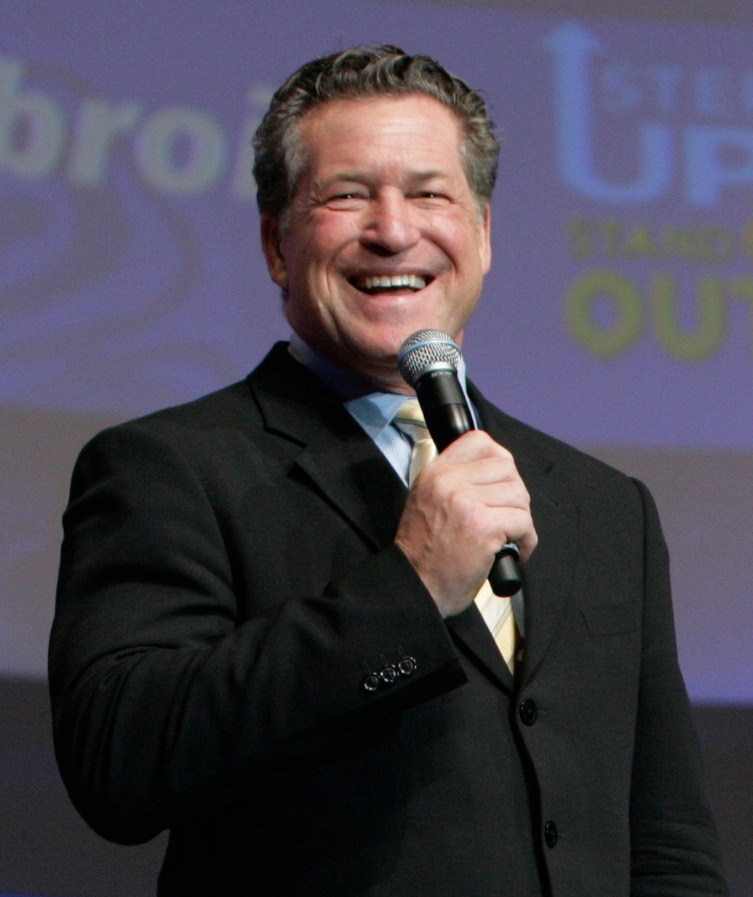
- Occupations: American Author, Motivational Speaker

Mark Scharenbroich (/ˈʃɜːrnbrɒk/ SHURN-brok; born 1953) is an American motivational speaker, humorist, and author.

== Early life ==
In the 1970s Scharenbroich attended St. Cloud State University in St. Cloud, Minnesota where he earned a degree in mass communications. While there he toured high schools and colleges with a comedy troupe called Mom's Apple Pie.

== Career ==
In 1979, Scharenbroich was hired by Jostens to speak at high schools throughout North America. He was featured in the film The Greatest Days of Your Life …So Far, for which Scharenbroich won the Golden Apple and Silver Screen film awards for writing and performing. He won an Emmy Award as writer/producer for an ABC TV special and is the recipient of several international film awards.

In 1984, he established Scharenbroich & Associates, a communications and production company. Certified by the National Speaker's Association as a Certified Speaking Professional (CSP), in 2003, Scharenbroich was inducted into the National Speaker's Association Hall of Fame, receiving the CPAE award — NSA's Council of Peers Award of Excellence.

Scharenbroich has also worked with businesses and professional associations, with presentations focused on communication, leadership, organizational culture, teamwork, and relationships with customers and colleagues. A recurring theme of his work is the importance of making meaningful connections with others.

In 2010, Scharenbroich published Nice Bike: Making Meaningful Connections on the Road of Life. The book developed the “Nice Bike” concept, which uses an encounter at the Harley-Davidson 100th anniversary celebration in Milwaukee as a metaphor for acknowledging, honoring, and connecting with other people. The concept subsequently became a recurring theme in Scharenbroich's professional speaking work.

Scharenbroich was included in Global Gurus' Top 30 Motivational Speakers rankings.

== Publications ==
=== Books ===
Scharenbroich, Mark (2010). Nice Bike: Making Meaningful Connections on the Road of Life. Minneapolis: Echo Bay Publishing. pp 168 pages. ISBN 978-0-9826562-3-5

=== Films/DVD programs ===
- The Greatest Days of Your Life . . . So Far. Minneapolis: Jostens, 1981.
- T is for Teacher. Minneapolis: Jostens, 1983.
- One of a Kind. Minneapolis: Scharenbroich & Associates, 1984.
- Pathways to Performance. Minneapolis: Scharenbroich & Associates, 1986.
- Choose to Lead. Minneapolis: Scharenbroich & Associates, 1987.
- Is this your first? Minneapolis: Scharenbroich & Associates, 1995.
- Building Connections to Improve School Climate. Minneapolis: Scharenbroich & Associates, 2000.
- Building Connections: 100+ Ideas to Improve School Climate. Minneapolis: Scharenbroich & Associates, 2004.
- What’s It About?. Minneapolis: Scharenbroich & Associates, 2005.
- Building Connections to Improve Student Achievement. Minneapolis: Scharenbroich & Associates, 2010.

== Awards and honors ==
- Gold Medal (2011) for Nice Bike: Making Meaningful Connections on the Road of Life, Coaching/Mentoring, Axiom Business Book Awards.
- Silver Award (2011) for Nice Bike: Making Meaningful Connections on the Road of Life, Psychology, IBPA Benjamin Franklin Awards.
- National Speaker's Association (2003) Hall of Fame, CPAE
- National Speaker's Association (2003) Certified Speaking Professional (CSP)
- Silver Screen Award (1982) for The Greatest Days of Your Life…So Far
- National Council on Family Relations (1985), 1st Place for One of A Kind
- Golden Apple Award (1989) for The Greatest Days of Your Life…So Far
- Telly Award (2004) for Building Connections
- Telly Award (2005) for What’s it About? (Writer/Producer)
- Aurora Awards (2004, Gold Award) for What’s it About?
- International Health and Medical Film award (2005) for What’s it About?, and Building Connections (finalist)
- International Davey Award (2005, Gold Winner – Education) for What’s it About?
