= Noémi Ban =

Hungarian-born American Jewish Holocaust survivor

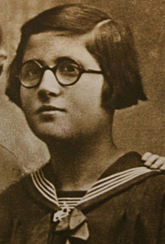
- Ban, c. 1930
- Born: Noémi Schönberger; September 29, 1922; Szeged, Kingdom of Hungary
- Died: June 7, 2019 (aged 96); Bellingham, Washington, U.S.
- Spouse: Earnest Ban (Bán Ernő)

Noémi Ban (/noʊˈeɪmi ˈbɑːn/; née Schönberger; Hungarian: Bán Noémi [ˈbaːn ˈnoeːmi]; September 29, 1922 – June 7, 2019) was a Hungarian-born American Jew and survivor of the Holocaust. Later in life she was a Golden Apple Award-winning lecturer, public speaker, and teacher residing in Whatcom County, Washington.

== The Holocaust ==
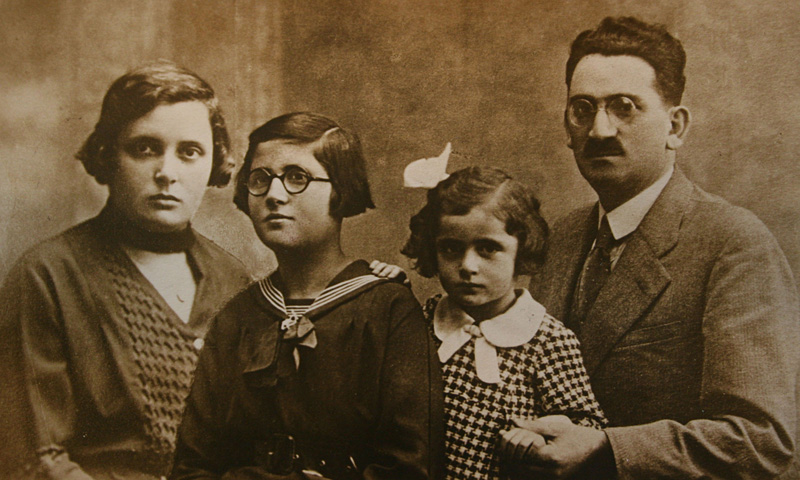
The Schönberger family

Ban was born Noémi Schönberger to Juliska and Samu Schönberger and in Szeged, Hungary. She was the eldest of three children, followed by her sister Erzsébet and six-month-old brother Gábor. Ban herself was only twenty when she was sectioned off in a ghetto with other Jews.

During Operation Margarethe, the German invasion and occupation of Hungary, Samu was sent to a labor camp while she, Erzsébet, Gábor, Juliska, her grandmother Nina, and eleven other relatives were sent to the Auschwitz concentration camp, arriving on July 1, 1944. All of Ban's family members in Auschwitz were killed, but Ban herself was transferred by Josef Mengele to the Buchenwald concentration camp to work in a bomb factory, where she intentionally constructed faulty bombs.

On April 15, 1945, the campmates of Buchenwald were forced to march to Bergen-Belsen concentration camp. On the way, Ban and eleven of her campmates escaped and were discovered by the U.S. Army, who had just liberated the Bergen-Belsen camp.

Ban returned to Budapest, Hungary, in September 1945, where she reunited with her father, Samu (who later changed his surname to Gábor in honor of his deceased son). That October she married a Budapester teacher, Ernő Bán (later Earnest Ban).

After the Communist occupation and takeover of Hungary between 1947 and 1948, Ban became a 7th and 8th grade teacher herself. Suffering from Soviet oppression, Ban, Earnest, and their two sons, István (Steven) and György (George), tried to escape to Austria, but were stopped on a train crossing the border. On December 29, 1956, less than a month later, the Bans again tried to cross, this time hidden in a shipment of giant balls of yarn. The attempt succeeded and they ended up in Sopron, Austria.

== America ==
In 1957, Noémi and her family moved to St. Louis, Missouri. She and Earnest learned English and earned degrees in education. Their son Steven moved to Bellingham, Washington, prompting Noémi and Earnest to move in 1982. In 1994, Earnest died of Alzheimer's disease.

After Earnest's death, Ban became a public Holocaust speaker, giving lectures nationally and internationally (in Hungary and Taipei, Taiwan). In 1998 she received the Golden Apple Award. In 2003 she wrote Sharing Is Healing: A Holocaust Survivor's Story, an autobiography of her experiences during the Holocaust and as a public speaker. In 2007 her life was made into the documentary film My Name Is Noémi. She died in June 2019 at the age of 96.
