= David J. Morris (writer) =

American Marine infantry officer and writer

David J. Morris is an American writer and former Marine infantry officer.

== Biography ==
Morris graduated from Texas A&M University with a degree in history in 1994. He served as a rifle platoon commander in the Third Battalion, Fifth Marines from 1994 to 1998. His first book, Storm on the Horizon, an account of the Gulf War battle of Khafji was published by Simon & Schuster in 2004 and subsequently adapted for television by The History Channel. Shortly after his first book came out, Morris began working as a war correspondent in Iraq, covering the first battle of Fallujah and the Anbar Awakening for Salon and the Virginia Quarterly Review.

His story “The Big Suck: Notes from the Jarhead Underground” was originally published in VQR and was included in The Best American Nonrequired Reading 2007. His writing has appeared in The New Yorker, The New York Times, Slate, The Daily Beast, The Los Angeles Times and The Surfer's Journal.

His 2015 book The Evil Hours: A Biography of Post-traumatic Stress Disorder describes his experiences as a reporter in Iraq and his subsequent struggles with post-traumatic stress. The book also examines the personal, cultural and scientific aspects of PTSD. The Times Literary Supplement said the book, "Conveys the mysteries of trauma in a way that is unsurpassed in the literature," adding that it is "the most important book published on the subject in this century." David Brooks, the New York Times columnist wrote that The Evil Hours "reminded me why I wanted to be a writer in the first place. It communicates the realities of PTSD, both to those who live with it and those who never have." The book was also a New York Times "Editors' Choice" and a finalist for the Los Angeles Times Book Prize.

Morris is originally from San Diego, California. He holds a Master of Fine Arts in Fiction from the University of California, Irvine as well as an M.A. in British Literature from San Diego State University. In 2008, he was awarded a creative nonfiction fellowship from the National Endowment for the Arts as well as residencies at The MacDowell Colony and the Norman Mailer Writers Colony in Provincetown, Massachusetts. In 2009 he won the Staige D. Blackford Award for nonfiction writing from the Virginia Quarterly Review. He has taught writing at the University of California, Riverside and at the Bread Loaf Writers' Conference in Ripton, Vermont. Morris is currently a professor in the Department of English at the University of Nevada, Las Vegas.

== Bibliography ==
- Morris, David J. Storm on the Horizon: Khafji--The Battle that Changed the Course of the Gulf War. Simon & Schuster. ISBN 0743235576
- Morris, David J. The Evil Hours: A Biography of Post-traumatic Stress Disorder. Houghton Mifflin Harcourt. ISBN 0544086619
