= Teacher Salary Project =

Non-profit organization

The Teacher Salary Project is a non-profit organization dedicated to raising awareness surrounding the working conditions and salaries of public school teachers throughout America. The mission of The Teacher Salary Project is to address the concerns and issues facing our education system through the eyes and experiences of teachers. It proposes that teacher salary reform is an effective method of attracting and retaining top-quality teachers to the field of education. The project began with the New York Times best-selling book Teachers Have It Easy: The Big Sacrifices and Small Salaries of America’s Teachers, co-authored by teacher and journalist Daniel Moulthrop, co-founder of 826 National Nínive Calegari, and writer Dave Eggers. In 2011, The Teacher Salary Project released the feature-length documentary film American Teacher. The film was officially released at select theaters in several major U.S. cities in the Fall of 2011. In fall of 2013, The Teacher Salary Project launched a Governors' Challenge to take stock of and showcase what each of the fifty state governors are doing to recruit and retain the best teaching force that can most effectively serve their states' students.

== Teachers Have It Easy ==
Teachers Have It Easy: The Big Sacrifices and Small Salaries of America’s Teachers (ISBN 1-565-84955-8) was released in June 2005 and is co-authored by Nínive Calegari, Dave Eggers, and Daniel Moulthrop. The book utilizes a large catalog of teacher testimonies in portraying the working conditions of public school teachers throughout various urban and rural areas across America. The subject of teacher salary reform is addressed in light of the teacher accounts therein that portray a job that, however rewarding, is demanding and trying upon one's time and finances. The book follows the wide range of teacher testimonies with a chapter that contrasts a typical day of a teacher alongside that of a pharmaceutical salesman. The book also investigates several districts and schools that have made successful reforms on the teacher salary level.

Examples of successful reform are highlighted in Denver's ProComp system, which was initiated in 2006 and rewarded teachers performance bonuses for education, student achievement, and for teaching in hard-to-staff and/or hard-to-serve positions; The Vaughn Next Center Learning in Los Angeles, California for their innovative methods in evaluating teachers and rewarding them for effective performance; and, lastly, the public school district in Helena, Montana in how they were able to free up $1 million to be used in attracting and rewarding top-quality teachers.

The book has appeared on the New York Times extended best-seller list and has been featured on C-SPAN, and NPR's Marketplace.

== American Teacher ==
American Teacher is a feature-length documentary created and produced by The Teacher Salary Project. Following the format of the book Teachers Have It Easy: The Big Sacrifices and Small Salaries of America’s Teachers, the film utilizes a large collection of teacher testimonies and contrasts the demands of the teaching profession alongside interviews with education experts and education reform news from around the country.

== The Governors' Challenge ==
The Governors' Challenge began with the November mailing of American Teacher, along with a brochure about teachers, teachers' finances, and action steps for governors to take with their staff, to every U.S. governor, governors' spouse, and Chief State School Officer. Based on the premise that, as leaders of their states, governors have tremendous influence and ability to generate political will to prioritize important policies like teacher pay, the Governors' Challenge aims to showcase what each governor is doing (or not) to support improved teacher salaries with the goal of attracting and retaining great teachers for every student. The Teacher Salary Project developed an online interactive map to publish the latest and most innovative efforts to improve teacher pay throughout all fifty states in one comprehensive site, where governors will be applauded for their efforts to help elevate the prestige of teaching in their state and to attract talented individuals to the teaching profession. The site is intended to enable governors across the country to learn from one another and adopt similar strategies for elevating the teaching profession in their own states to be a financially attractive, prestigious, and sustainable profession.
