= David Gessner =

American writer (born 1961)

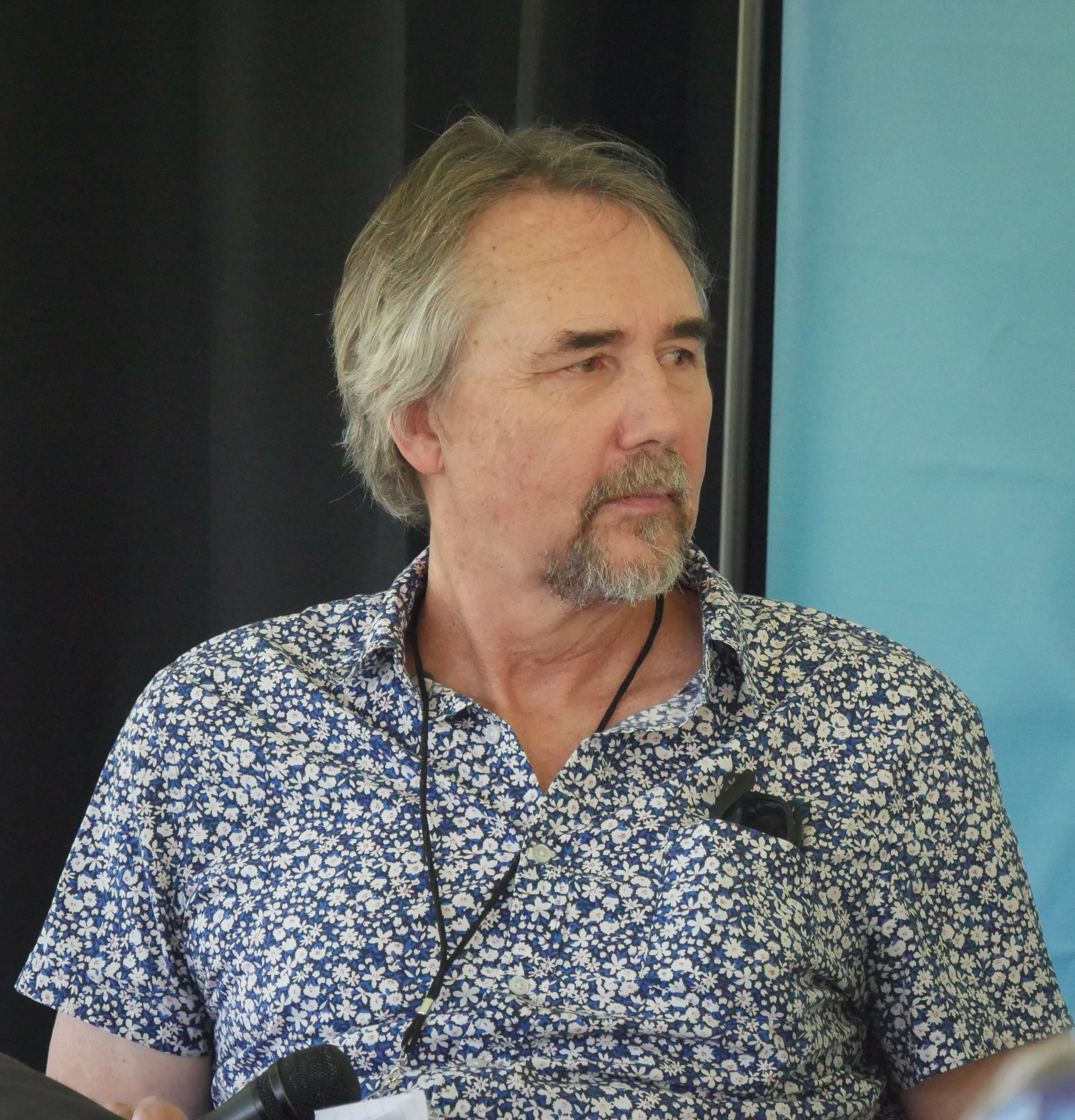
- Born: 1961 (age 64–65)
- Occupations: Essayist, nature writer, memoirist, editor, college professor, and cartoonist
- Spouse: Nina de Gramont
- Writing career
- Genres: Environmental, natural history, nonfiction
- Website: www.davidgessner.net

David Gessner is an American essayist, memoirist, nature writer, editor, and cartoonist.

Gessner was born in Boston, Massachusetts and grew up in Worcester, Massachusetts. He attended Harvard College where he worked at the Harvard Crimson drawing political cartoons, most notably a drawing of Ronald Reagan urinating on an unemployed man in the gutter, entitled "The Trickle Down Theory". He was awarded his degree in 1983. He is married to the novelist Nina de Gramont.

He is the author of fourteen books that blend a love of nature, humor, memoir, and environmentalism, including Leave It As It Is: A Journey Through Theodore Roosevelt’s American Wilderness and the New York Times-bestselling All the Wild That Remains: Edward Abbey, Wallace Stegner and the American West. His prizes include a Pushcart Prize, the John Burroughs Award for Best Nature Essay, the Association for Study of Literature and the Environment’s award for best book of creative writing, and the Reed Award for Best Book on the Southern Environment. In 2017 he appeared on the National Geographic Explorer show "The Call of the Wild".

== Teaching and editing ==
He returned to Harvard as a Briggs-Copeland Lecturer in Environmental Writing in Fall 2003. In 2004, he began teaching at the University of North Carolina Wilmington, where he is currently the Thomas S. Kenan III Distinguished Professor. He is the editor in chief of Ecotone, the environmental journal he founded in 2004, which has published the work of writers as diverse as Wendell Berry, Denis Johnson, Gerald Stern, Sherman Alexie, and Marvin Bell. Recent work from the journal has been chosen for many anthologies, including the Pushcart Prize and Best American Short Stories edited by Salman Rushdie, as well as Best American Poetry and Best American Essays.

== Recent books and awards ==
Gessner is the author of fourteen books of nonfiction, including, most recently The Book of Flaco, A Traveler's Guide To The End of The World, "All The Wild That Remains: Edward Abbey, Wallace Stegner and the American West, as well as the Ultimate Glory: Frisbee, Obsession, and My Wild Youth; the New York Times bestseller. The Tarball Chronicles won the 2012 Reed Award for Best Book on the Southern Environment and the Association for Study of Literature and the Environment’s award for best book of creative writing in 2011 and 2012.

== Magazine and journal writing ==
Gessner's most recently published articles have been via Orion magazine, where he has an active column covering climate change. His essays have appeared in many magazines and journals including The New York Times Magazine, Outside, The Best American Nonrequired Reading 2008, Onearth, The Georgia Review, The American Scholar, Orion, The Boston Sunday Globe Magazine, The Harvard Review, and the 2006 Pushcart Prize Anthology, for which the essay "Benediction" was selected. In April 2007, Gessner won the John Burroughs award for Best Natural History Essay of the year. In 2008, his essay, "The Dreamer Did Not Exist", appeared in The Best American Nonrequired Reading 2008, edited by Dave Eggers, and in September of that year his essay on teaching and writing, "Those Who Write, Teach", appeared in the Sunday New York Times Magazine.

== Television, online work, and blog ==
Gessner is the co-creator of Bill and Dave's Cocktail Hour, a website for which he and author Bill Roorbach write blogs.

In January 2016, he served as the host of the National Geographic Explorer television show, Call of the Wild, which explored how viewing screens is affecting our brains adversely and how nature can be restorative. In October 2013, he appeared on MSNBC's The Cycle to offer his take on the anniversary of Hurricane Sandy.

== Literary works ==
In 1997, Gessner published A Wild, Rank Place, a short memoir about spending a year on Cape Cod and tending to his father, who was dying of cancer. The book subverted the typical Thoreauvian year-in-the-woods theme with its dark themes and blunt language. This was followed by Under the Devil’s Thumb, a collection of essays about an easterner's years spent in the west, years made more vital and radiant by the author's own recovery from testicular cancer.

Since 2001, Gessner has published seven more books that combine memoir with humor and observations of the natural world, beginning with Return of the Osprey, in 2001. The Boston Globe and Book of the Month Club both chose Osprey as one of the top ten nonfiction books of 2001, the Globe calling it a "classic of American Nature Writing".

In 2003, Gessner published Sick of Nature. Sick of Nature has been much-anthologized and taught at MIT and Harvard University and many other colleges. Of Sick of Nature, renowned eco-critic Michael Branch wrote, "Gessner has positioned himself as a sort of Woody Allen of environmental writers" and "like Emerson, who observed that the dead forms of institutional practice must be revivified through radical acts of intellectual, aesthetic, and moral imagination, Gessner rails against the narrowness of environmental literature to open the field to new (if less earnest) approaches."

This was followed by The Prophet of Dry Hill, which described a series of encounters with the great nature writer John Hay. In Soaring with Fidel, released in April 2007, Gessner continued to push the nature genre, following the entire 7,000 mile migration of ospreys from New England to Cuba and Venezuela.

== Bibliography ==
- A Wild, Rank Place: One Year on Cape Cod, (1997)
- Under the Devil's Thumb, (1999)
- Return of the Osprey: A Season of Flight and Wonder, (2002)
- Sick of Nature, (2004)
- The Prophet of Dry Hill: Lessons from a Life in Nature, (2005)
- Soaring with Fidel: An Osprey Odyssey from Cape Cod to Cuba and Beyond, (2008)
- My Green Manifesto: Down the Charles River in Pursuit of a New Environmentalism, (2011)
- The Tarball Chronicles: A Journey Beyond the Oiled Pelican and Into the Heart of the Gulf Oil Spill, (2012)
- All the Wild That Remains: Edward Abbey, Wallace Stegner, and the American West, (2016)
- Ultimate Glory: Frisbee, Obsession, and My Wild Youth, (2017)
- Leave It As It Is: A Journey Through Theodore Roosevelt’s American Wilderness, (2020)
- A Traveler's Guide to the End of the World (June 20, 2023)
- The Book of Flaco: The World’s Most Famous Bird (2025)
