= ScholarMatch =

San Francisco-based nonprofit organization

ScholarMatch is a San Francisco-based nonprofit organization that connects donors with prospective college students in order for them to help fund students' education.

== History ==
ScholarMatch was launched in April 2010 by writer and philanthropist Dave Eggers. 826 Valencia, a nonprofit writing and tutoring center in San Francisco that Eggers founded with teacher Nínive Clements Calegari, grants four scholarships per year to local students, but each year, "the other 100 applicants would go wanting," Eggers said in a press release about ScholarMatch. Thinking that many donors are more likely to fund the college aspirations of students if they get to know those students, and if there is a way to stay connected to those students once they’re enrolled, Eggers founded ScholarMatch as a "new tool," for directing available money to students in need. As of June 2011, 34 scholars registered with ScholarMatch had their scholarship goals met, either entirely through ScholarMatch or in partnership with other organizations. Such celebrities as novelist Ayelet Waldman and actor John Krasinski have donated to scholars, as have Microsoft and the Wallace Alexander Gerbode Foundation.

== Infrastructure ==
ScholarMatch operates a website and as a drop-in center at 849 Valencia Street. The website is geared toward students, which the organization calls "scholars," as well as potential donors. Scholars submit profiles that include information such as high school extracurricular activities, grade-point average, and the college they plan to attend. No profile is published without an edited personal statement and at least one letter of recommendation. Once a profile is published on the website, anyone registered with ScholarMatch can view it and donate. Donors are sent updates from the scholars they helped, and have the opportunity to meet them.

At the drop-in center, scholars can use one of the computers to submit a profile, review their financial aid package, or ask questions about college. Just as 826 Valencia had to negotiate zoning codes during its inception, ScholarMatch needed to be a retail space in order to operate out of their building; thus, college guide books, test-preparation manuals and other educational resources are for sale. Further, the staff at ScholarMatch, including director of operations Miel Alegre, host workshops that help students apply for college, understand their financial aid packages and complete ScholarMatch profiles.
