= Story Factory =

Australian not-for-profit organisation

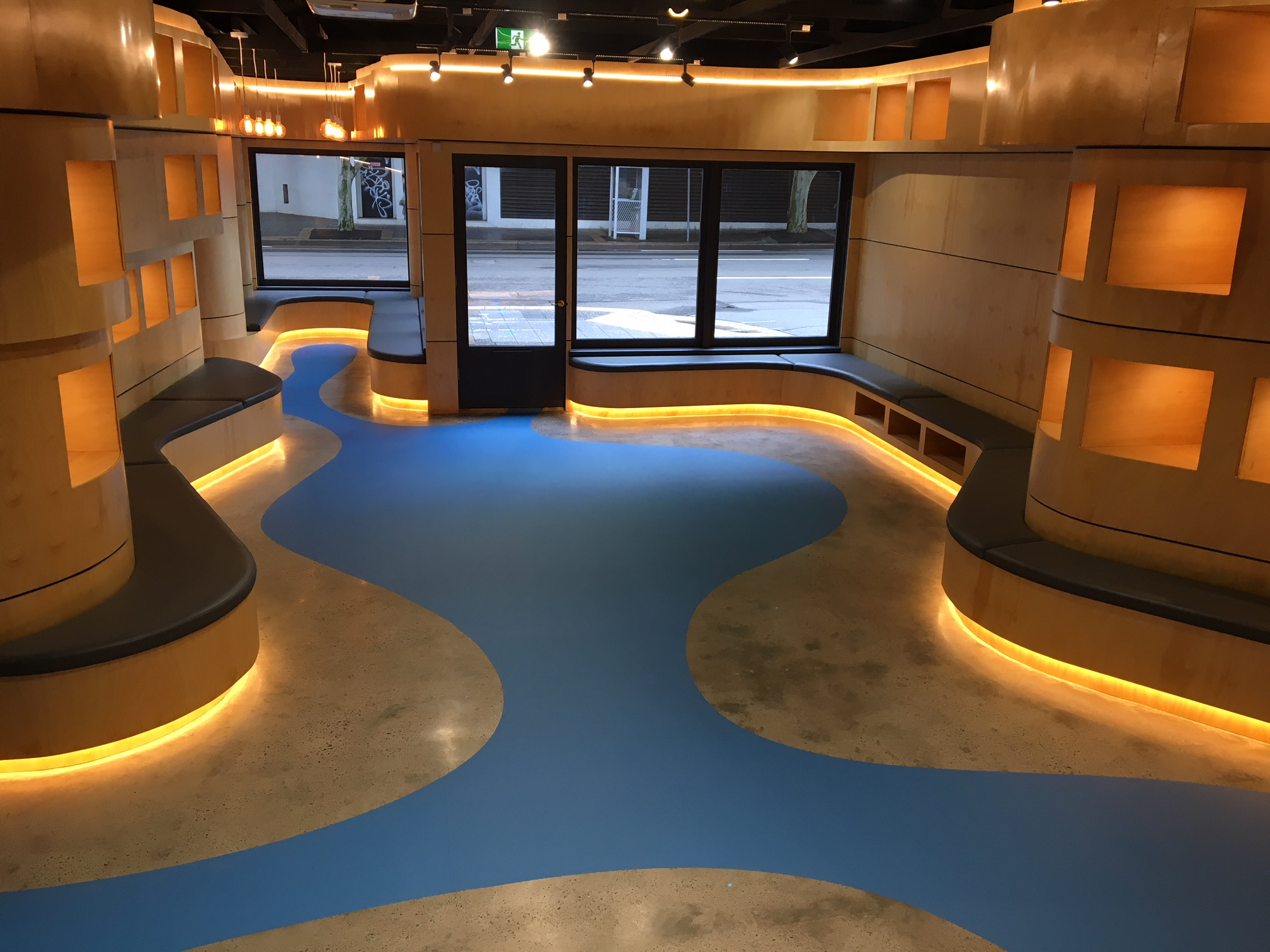
Parramatta Creative Writing Centre

The Story Factory is an Australian not-for-profit organisation designed to help indigenous and disadvantaged school-aged children (generally 7 to 17 years old) to develop their writing and storytelling skills. The programs run by the Story Factory aim to help young people, particularly those from a disadvantaged or minority background, develop their confidence, creativity and skills in writing. The Story Factory conducts programs at its two creative writing centres, as short and long term residencies at primary and secondary schools, and as one-off visits.

The Story Factory began in 2012 as the Sydney Story Factory in Redfern, in inner city Sydney. The organisation changed its name to the Story Factory at the opening of their second site in Parramatta to the west of Sydney in October 2018.

== History ==
In 2010 the co-founders of the Story Factory, Catherine Keenan AM and Tim McGregor, heard Dave Eggers give a TED talk about 826 Valencia and they were inspired to set up something similar in Sydney. They flew to San Francisco and visited 826 Valencia to learn as much as they could about its model. Unlike 826 Valencia, The Story Factory does not provide homework help, but focuses on creative writing.

As a not-for-profit organisation that relies on volunteers and donations for support, it took approximately 18 months to get the first site of The Story Factory operational. The initial volunteers' meeting drew a crowd of 200 people.

Between its opening in 2012 and October 2018, approximately 16,000 students participated in the programs. In 2018 they had 1050 active volunteer writing tutors and were seeing approximately 800 children per week.

== Philosophy and operation ==
The Story Factory focuses on creative writing rather than the homework help provided in the original 826 Valencia program. This philosophy is based on discussion with local teachers who said that there is much less space for creativity in the Australian curriculum now.

The University of Sydney conducted an evaluation of the student involvement in the Story Factory from 2014 to 2016. The study looked at the development of writing skills, self-confidence, engagement in learning, and enthusiasm for creative writing. The study used case study methodology and also pre- and post-program surveys. A total of 88 students were surveyed and from these 10 were the subject of detailed case studies. The evaluation showed that students felt positive about the program and believed it helped with school work. It showed the students gained empowerment and grew in self-knowledge and self-awareness. Students who participated in several workshops grew their creative writing skills often to a higher level than would be expected of their grade or stage.

An evaluation of the in-schools residency programs run by the Story Factory found a "notable shift in writing confidence and enjoyment" in all five schools involved and this was particularly strong among Aboriginal and Torres Strait Islander participants.

Former board member of The Story Factory, Professor Robyn Ewing, stated that "education is possibly the most critical factor in alleviating disadvantage, and the Story Factory strives to change the lives of young people, especially those from marginalised backgrounds, through creative writing and storytelling."

The Story Factory is supported by a variety of people. This includes three former Australian Prime Ministers: Julia Gillard and Tony Abbot who appeared is a video for the Story Factory in 2011 and Malcolm Turnbull through the Turnbull Foundation. It has also conducted four art auctions in 2011, 2013, 2015 and 2017 The auctions have received donations from six Archibald Prize winners: Kathryn Del Barton, Fiona Lowry, Nigel Milsom, Mitch Cairns, Euan Macleod and Wendy Sharpe. In 2017 the auction also included 2016 Archibald Prize finalist Abdul Abdullah, and another 45 artists.

=== Leadership ===
Catherine Keenan is the co-founder and executive director of the Sydney Story Factory. In 2016 she was recognised as Australian of The Year, Local Hero for her work with the Story Factory. Keenan was made a Member of the Order of Australia in 2019 for "significant service to children as an advocate for improving literacy, and to the community of Redfern."

=== Story Factory Spaces ===
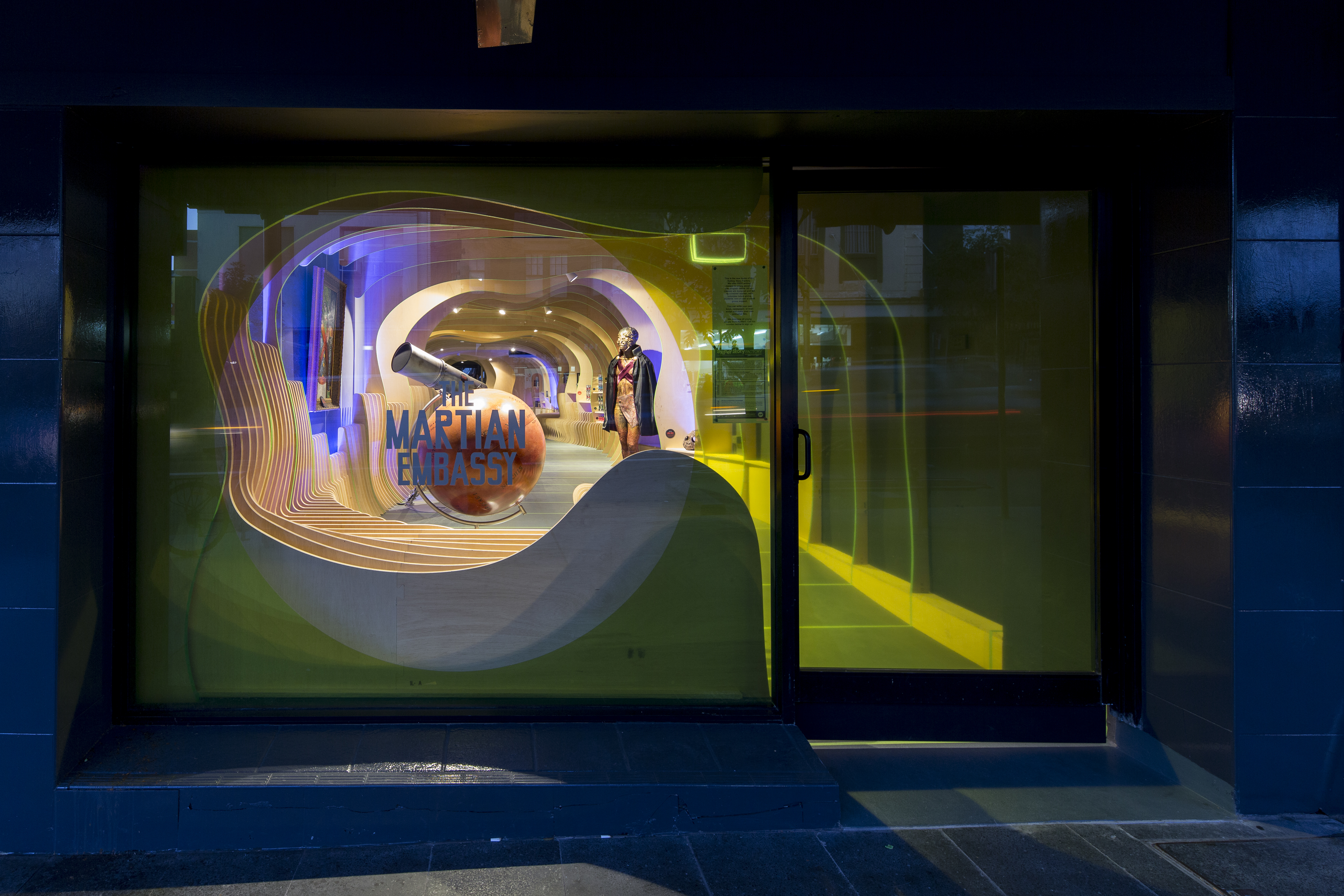
Martian Embassy, Redfern

==== Redfern ====
The Story Factory first opened in Redfern in 2012. The Story Factory is accessed through the Martian Embassy, whose design was awarded the 2013 NSW Premiers prize by the Australian Institute of Architects. The idea is a spinoff from 826 Valencia that has a Pirate Supply Shop as its front. Keenan stated that the kids and the volunteers loved the design and the staff liked the idea of going to another world. The Martian Embassy is the retail arm of the Story Factory. The shop then opens into the creative space.

==== Parramatta ====
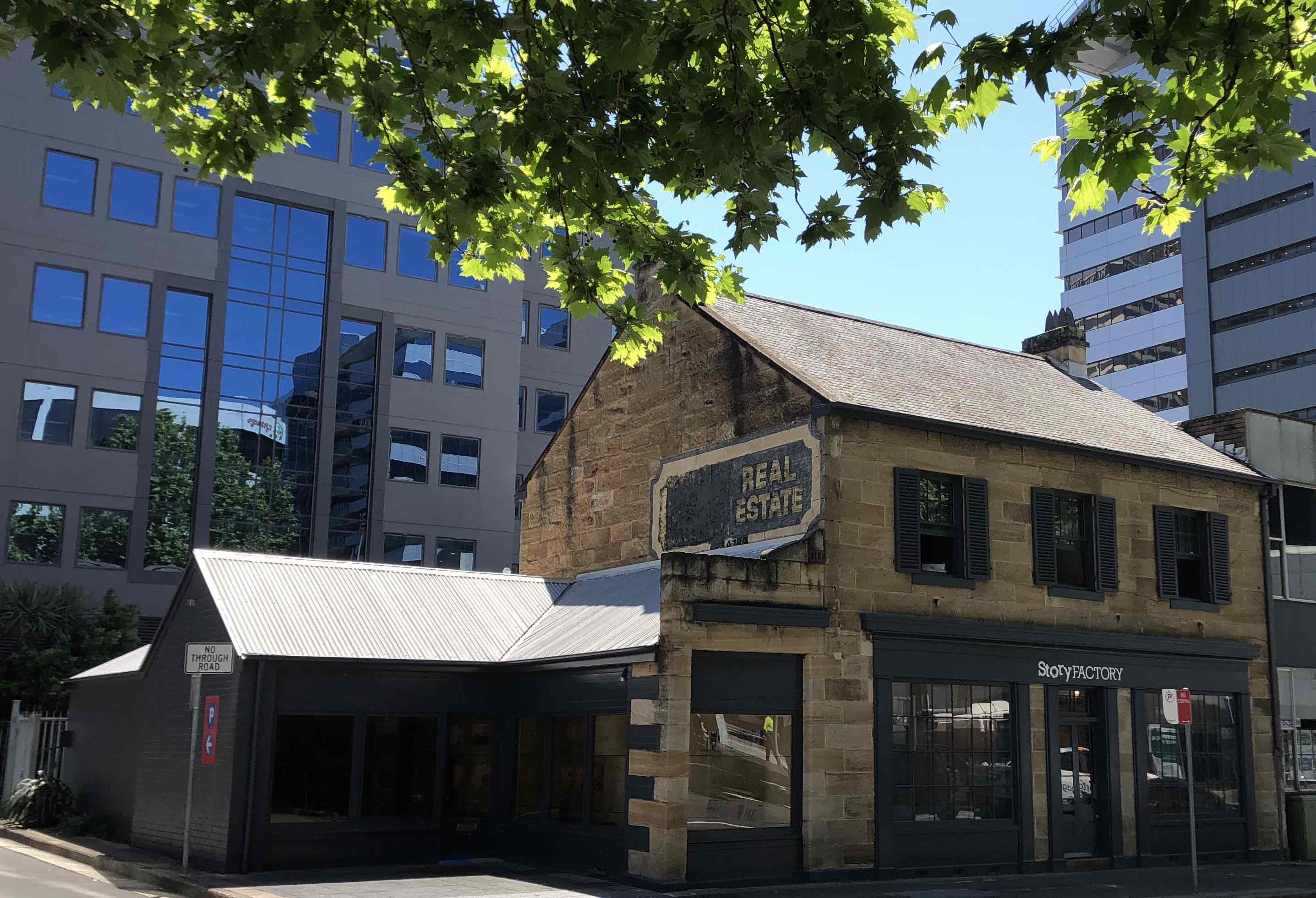
Parramatta Story Factory

In 2016 more than 25% of the students attending the Redfern creative space travelled from Western Sydney. Western Sydney has the largest Indigenous population in the country and many new immigrants. With the assistance of a grant from the Commonwealth Government and other donations, the Parramatta location opened in October 2018. The building at 90 George Street is heritage listed. Refurbishing to make it a suitable workshop space involved consideration of heritage requirements. The space was shortlisted for 2019 public design by the Australian Interior Design Awards

=== School Residency Programs ===
The Story Factory runs year long residency programs with local schools, at both Primary and Secondary levels. The first residency program lasted for a full school term at the Briar Road Public School in Campbelltown. In 2017 Canterbury Boys High was given a 12-month Story Factory residency program. The program was recognised in the 2018 NSW Department of Education Minister's and Secretary's Award for Excellence when Canterbury Boys High as awarded the 2018 Secretary's Award for Outstanding School Initiative.

=== The Year of Novella (YON) and Year of Poetry (YOP) Programs ===
In 2016 The Story Factory initiated a pilot Novella Program and selected children aged between 12 and 16 to write a novella of between 20,000 and 30,000 words. The works were published by The Story Factory in December 2016.

In 2018, Story Factory began the Year of Poetry; a sister-program to the Year of Novella. The students spend the year writing their own poetry collections which are published alongside the YON students at a joint book launch at the end of each year. As part of the program, established poets such as Jazz Money, Dan Hogan Luka Lesson, Eileen Chong, and Eunice Andrada have visited the students to talk about their work and experiences.

Both programs are continuing, with more students eager to join each year. In February 2023, 30 students across both programs published their own books which they wrote throughout 2022. All novellas and poetry collections are available for purchase through the Story Factory website.

One of the novellas from the program's run in 2017, Coconut Children by Vivian Pham, has been expanded and published by Penguin Random House. Coconut Children has since been made into an audio book.
