= Jessica Koehne =

American nanoscientist

- Education: Santa Clara University (BS, 2000); University of California, Davis (PhD, 2009)
- Known for: Development of carbon nanofiber biosensors for space missions
- Awards: Presidential Early Career Award for Scientists and Engineers (2011); Women in Aerospace Outstanding Achievement Award (2018); Ames Research Innovation Award (2024)

Jessica E. Koehne is an American nanoscientist whose research focuses on the use of carbon nanofibers as easily fabricated biosensors and their application in space missions. She is a senior scientist at NASA's Ames Research Center, and has chaired the Sensor Division of the Electrochemical Society. She also holds an adjunct graduate faculty affiliation at Boise State University.

== Education and career ==
Koehne was a 1996 alumna of the Santa Catalina School, a private high school in Monterey, California, near where she grew up. She majored in chemistry as an undergraduate at Santa Clara University, graduating in 2000.

She has worked at the Ames Research Center since 2001. While continuing to work at the Ames Research Center, she completed her Ph.D. in chemistry from the University of California, Davis in 2009.

== Recognition ==
Koehne was a recipient of the 2011 Presidential Early Career Award for Scientists and Engineers, "recognized for exceptional dedication to the development of nano-bio sensing systems for NASA mission needs". Women in Aerospace gave her their 2018 Outstanding Achievement Award, "for her work developing nano-bio sensors for space applications and mentoring next generation scientists and engineers". She is a 2024 recipient of the Ames Research Innovation Award.
