= 826LA =

American nonprofit organization

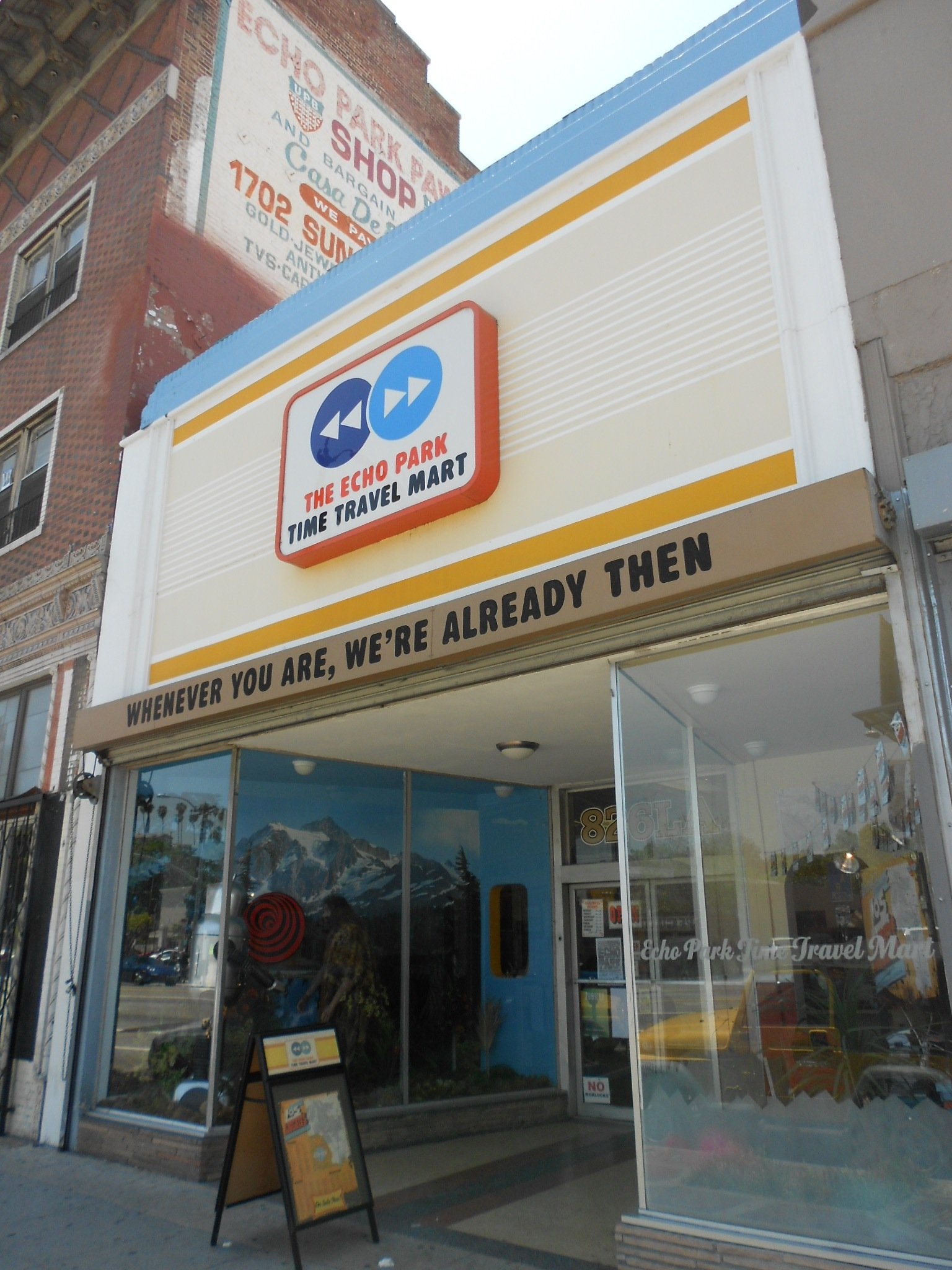
- Echo Park Time Travel Mart
- Formation: 2005
- Founders: Nínive Calegari and Dave Eggers
- Type: Non-profit organization
- Purpose: Education
- Headquarters: The Echo Park Time Travel Mart; 1714 W. Sunset Blvd. Los Angeles, CA 90026 The Mar Vista Time Travel Mart; 12515 Venice Blvd. Los Angeles, CA 90066
- Region served: Los Angeles
- Executive Director: Joel Arquillos
- Main organ: Advisory board: J.J. Abrams; Judd Apatow; Fiona Apple; Miguel Arteta; Mac Barnett; Steve Barr; Joshuah Bearman; Father Greg Boyle, SJ; Stefan G. Bucher; Mark Flanagan; Naomi Foner; Mitchell Frank; Ben Goldhirsh; Ellen Goldsmith-Vein; Nicole Holofcener; Spike Jonze; Miranda July; Catherine Keener; Al Madrigal; Melissa Mathison; Katie McGrath; R. Scott Mitchell; Lani Monos; B. J. Novak; Jane Patterson; Keri Putnam; Sonja Rasula; Luis J. Rodriguez; Tara Roth; J. Ryan Stradal; Sarah Vowell; Sally Willcox
- Affiliations: 826 National
- Staff: 20
- Volunteers: 4,000+
- Website: 826la.org

826LA is a Los Angeles–based nonprofit organization supporting students ages 6–18 with their creative and expository writing skills and helping teachers. Programs are structured around one-on-one attention. 826LA was founded in 2005 and is one of several chapters of 826 National. To serve students across Los Angeles' various regions, there are two locations: 826LA in Mar Vista and 826LA in Echo Park. The organization also operates Writers' Rooms on the campuses of Manual Arts High School in South Los Angeles and Roosevelt High School in Boyle Heights, and offers a range of virtual writing and tutoring programs.

There are eight other 826 National chapters; San Francisco (826 Valencia), NYC (826NYC), Chicago (826CHI), Ann Arbor/Ypsilanti/Detroit (826michigan), Boston (826 Boston), New Orleans (826 New Orleans), Minneapolis/St. Paul (826 MSP) and Washington, D.C. (826DC).

== The Time Travel Mart ==
The Time Travel Mart exists at both 826LA in Mar Vista and 826LA in Echo Park, specializing in products imported from the past and future, such as Viking odorant, robot milk, robot toupees, robot emotions, mammoth chunks, and other time travel-themed oddities created in partnership with local artists. The store and its initial line of products were conceived by writers Mac Barnett and Jon Korn, and graphic designer Stefan G. Bucher. The Time Travel Mart sells a variety of books for children and adults, as well as anthologies written by 826LA writing students.

== Programs ==
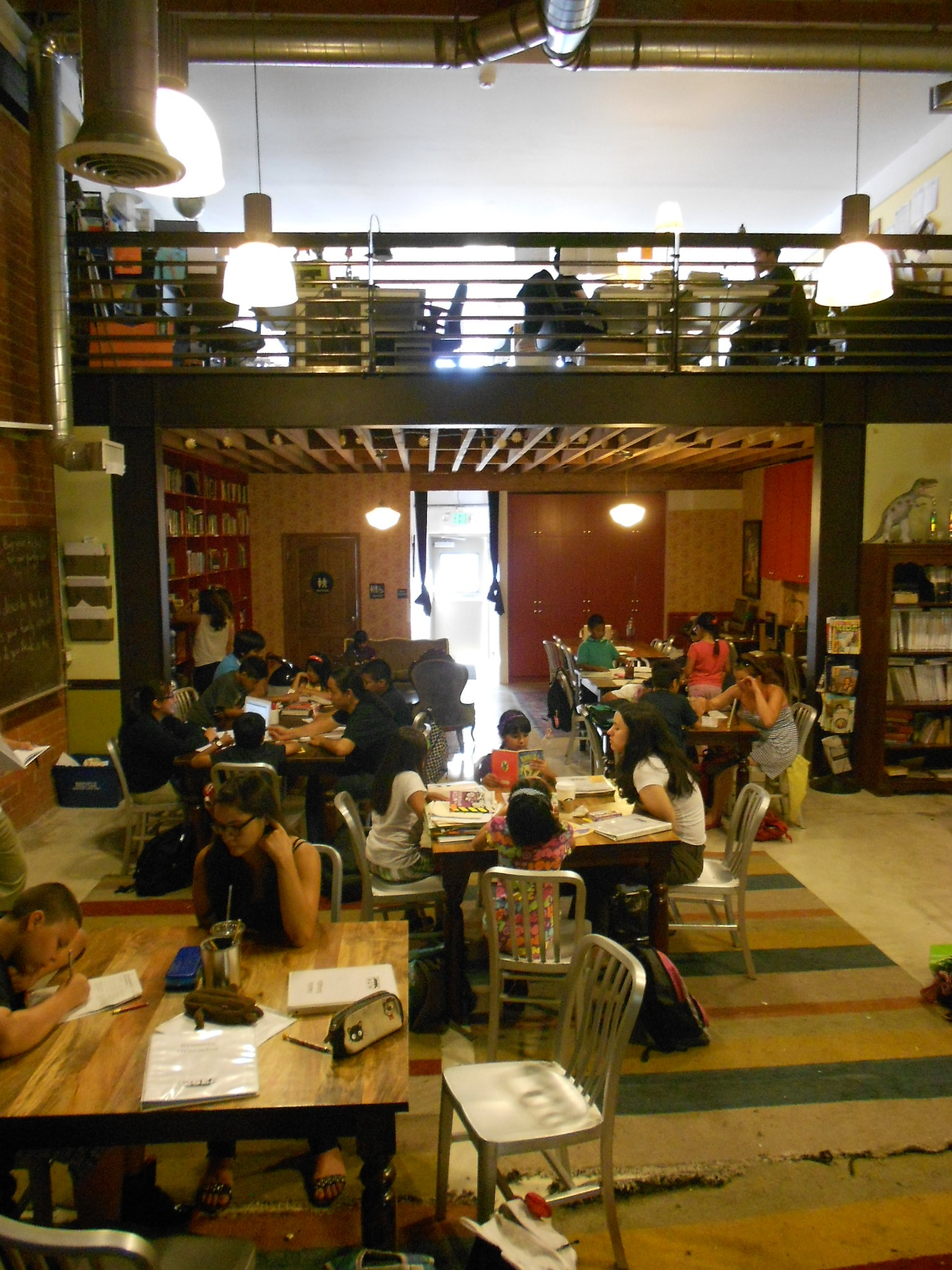
After School Tutoring

=== After-school tutoring ===
826LA offers free tutoring Monday through Thursday. Tutoring is offered with a focus on personalized instruction, offering local students individualized help with their homework. Students come to the writing labs, where they work with tutors to complete their daily assignments, and often to embark on ambitious writing projects: poems, stories, comic books, and self-initiated research. Student writing is compiled and published in chapbook form.

=== Workshops ===
826LA offers writing workshops that cover a wide spectrum of subjects, all designed to strengthen students’ skills, foster their creativity, and give them an opportunity to execute projects that showcase their work. Working professionals teach all the offered workshops, and class sizes are kept small to ensure individualized attention. These workshops focus on a variety of topics. Recent classes have covered crafting college-application essays, designing imaginary countries, preparing for the SAT, reviewing runway fashion, and writing love poetry from the perspective of leopards. In 2012, two workshops encouraged students to examine their daily lives and share their thoughts and experiences with students in Rwanda and India.

Among its many collaborative workshops is Sunday Afternoon For Kids, held at the Hammer Museum in which artists, writers and performers teach their craft.

A popular songwriting workshop brings together local musicians to collaborate with students in the songwriting process. In 2010, an edition of the workshop featured the band The Submarines, and was titled "Songwriting With The Submarines." The students' songs were then recorded by professional musicians and released as an album called Chickens in Love, featuring musicians such as The Submarines, Fiona Apple, Edward Sharpe and the Magnetic Zeros, Tim and Eric, Crystal Antlers, Cold War Kids, Dum Dum Girls, and more.

=== In-schools ===
826LA also sends volunteers into school throughout Los Angeles. Tutors support Los Angeles teachers in their classrooms, providing students with one-on-one attention and feedback as they work on various writing assignments: sonnets, biographies, University of California application essays, narrative essays, and more. In Spring 2006, Community Photoworks was created, an annual collaboration between 826LA and the J. Paul Getty Museum. Seventh-graders students were taught the basics of photographic composition, explored Los Angeles with cameras, and wrote and polished artist statements. Their photographs and statements were displayed in a gallery exhibition in Venice.

=== Field trips ===
In the mornings, classes from around Los Angeles visit the 826LA writing labs to participate in engaging and spirited field trips. Teachers can choose from various field-trip plans, such as workshops in screenwriting and journalism, or request a custom-designed program. Field trips are tailored to complement any teacher's curriculum.

The most popular field trip is "Storytelling & Bookmaking," in which classes collaborate to write stories for Professor Barnacle, the never-seen, always-cranky publisher behind Barnacle & Barnacle Books. With the help of several storytellers, an illustrator, and a typist, a class works together to create characters, a setting, and a plot for an original story. (A recent book chronicled the friendship between an injured mouse and a sandwich-making robot policeman. Others have featured time traveling tea-cup pigs, spaghetti monsters, and sentient planets). The action builds to a thrilling cliffhanger, and then each student has an opportunity to write an ending, create an illustration, bind his or her book, and walk away with the finished product. Barnacle is notoriously hard to please, but the students’ work manages to earn the professor's enthusiastic approval every time.

== Events ==
=== Dead Author Readings ===
Since 2008, 826LA has presented a series of Dead Author Readings, in which deceased wordsmiths such as Mary Shelley and Edgar Allan Poe have read from their works and answered questions from the audience. The first iteration took place at the Echo Park location and featured comedian Patton Oswalt, who impersonated William Fryer Harvey and read from the works "The Clock" and "August Heat." The series then morphed into a collaboration with Paul F. Tompkins and the Upright Citizen's Brigade. More recent readings have impersonated F. Scott Fitzgerald and James Joyce, Mary Shelley, O. Henry, J.R.R. Tolkien, and the Brothers Grimm.

=== Writer's panels ===
Starting in 2009, 826LA began running the Adult Writing Seminar Series, which was meant to provide insight for aspiring adult writers into the world of professional writing. Each workshop focused on a different genre and featured experienced writers at a panel discussion. Early topics included music writing, food writing, comedy writing, and memoir writing. After appearing as a panelist for the Comedy Writing seminar, Ben Blacker returned to moderate the TV Writing seminar, and the series has since become a collaboration with Nerdist entitled the Nerdist Writer's Panel, with Blacker as the sole moderator.

=== Fundraisers ===
826LA has become well known for hosting creative and entertaining fundraisers. In August 2008, 826LA hosted the Echo Park Lake Paddle Boat Regatta. In 2009, they hosted the first annual Craft Beer Fest at the Echoplex in Echo Park.

In 2010, Judd Apatow and Dave Eggers hosted an event called "I Found This Funny: An Evening of Music and Comedy." The event featured Lindsay Buckingham, Randy Newman, Garry Shandling, Aziz Ansari, Maria Bamford, and Ryan Adams. 826LA also hosted a celebrity spelling bee in 2010 called "Spelling Bee for Cheaters," which featured John Krasinski, Dave Eggers, Spike Jonze, and Jimmy Kimmel.

In 2011, director and photographer Spike Jonze and actress Miranda July competed in a ping-pong tournament to raise funds for 826LA, raising around $30,000.

In 2012, 826LA hosted the Judd and Jon Music and Comedy Hour(s), a music and comedy fundraiser featuring headliners Jon Brion and Judd Apatow, along with Pee Wee Herman, The RZA, Bob Newhart, Peter Frampton, Colin Quinn, and Ray Romano. The event raised over $250,000.

In 2020, 826LA hosted a live field trip for adults at the Santa Monica Airport.

The organization has also hosted numerous "In Conversation" events with authors including Miranda July, Natashia Deón, Neal Katyal, and more.
