= The Equity Project =

Charter school in New York City, New York, U.S.

TEP Charter School
- Founded: 2009
- Purpose: Providing disadvantaged students with world-class teachers
- Key people: Zeke Vanderhoek - Founder; David Coleman, President - Board of Trustees

The Equity Project (TEP) Charter School is a 480-student, 5th through 8th grade New York City charter middle school in the Manhattan neighborhood of Inwood.

== Background ==
TEP was founded in 2009 by Zeke Vanderhoek, a Yale graduate and former middle school teacher. Prior to founding TEP, Zeke was the founder and chairman of the educational company Manhattan Prep. In 2013, The New York State Education Department unconditionally renewed TEP's charter through 2018.

== Model ==
TEP focuses on "serving a historically marginalized and under-resourced student population". In 2014, TEP paid teachers an annual salary of $125,000. As of 2024, the salary has risen to $140,000 with the opportunity for an annual bonus of up to $25,000.

== Student body ==
TEP students are admitted through a lottery system that gives preference to students receiving free or reduced priced lunches, English Language Learners, and those receiving special education services. In 2013–14, 86% of students were free lunch eligible, 21% were English Language Learners, and 18% received special education services. The student body was 90% Latino, 8% Black, and 1% White. In 2021-2022, 27% were English Language Learners, and 23% of students had IEPs. The student body was 93% Latinx, 3% Black, 1% White, and <1% Asian.

== Faculty ==
As of June 2022, the school employed 134 people, 83 of which were instructional personnel. In contrast with student demographics, the teacher population is 37% White, 28% Black, 24% Latinx, and 10% Asian.

== Financial Model ==
TEP offers high teacher salaries by reducing administrative costs in the following areas:

- Each TEP teacher leads a grade level, program, or project
- TEP's instructional supervisors are also teachers. The assistant principal of TEP is also the school's 8th grade math teacher. TEP's Principal teaches a 7th grade class.
- TEP does not incur significant personnel costs for extended-day and other student activities, which are led and staffed by TEP teachers.
- TEP does not incur significant professional development fees. TEP conducts a one-week faculty-led staff development institute prior to the start of each trimester

== School Day and Academic Calendar ==
TEP operates on a year-round academic trimester schedule and instructs students in six subjects: English, math, science, social studies, physical education/health, and music. Students attend school from 7:45am – 4pm, approximately one hour and 45 minutes longer than the typical New York City school day. TEP is focused on providing students with depth in the discipline of music. Every student receives 45 minutes of daily instruction in music literacy, history, and performance. TEP students also receive 45 minutes of daily physical education. TEP offers a variety of athletics and enrichment opportunities, including competitive sports teams and clubs in the areas of academics, student governance, and the arts.

== Results and Outside Evaluation ==
In October 2014, Mathematica Policy Research released the results of a four-year study of TEP. The report found that students who attended TEP for four years achieved test score gains equal to an additional 1.6 years of school in math, 0.6 years in science, and 0.4 years in English.

== Press ==
TEP has been featured in various media outlets for its organizational model and results, including these articles:

- Wall Street Journal:The Equity Project Charter School Gets a Big Backer Charter School Boasts Big Pay and Big Results
- The Los Angeles Times: Investing in teacher pay could spur big gains for California students
- The New York Times: Next Test: Value of $125,000-a-Year Teachers
- 60 Minutes: NYC charter school's $125,000 experiment
- The Huffington Post: How Test Prep Is Done in One Washington Heights Charter School
- The Huffington Post: High-Demand Charter School: Staying the Course in Washington Heights
