= Stefan G. Bucher =

American writer and illustrator (born 1973)

- Born: 1973 (age 52–53)
- Education: Art Center College of Design, Pasadena, California
- Known for: Graphic Design, Illustration, Writing
- Website: 344design.com dailymonster.com

Stefan G. Bucher (born 1973) is an American writer, graphic designer and illustrator. He works through his design studio, 344 Design.

== Biography ==
Stefan G. Bucher attended the Art Center College of Design Upon graduation, Bucher became art director at the advertising agency Wieden & Kennedy in Portland, Oregon. Bucher went on to design CD packages including Brand New Day: The Remixes for Sting, and the soundtrack for The Matrix. His design of the 17th "American Photography" annual received the 2001 Silver Award for "Outstanding complete book design" by British Design & Advertising. His clients included KCRW DJ Jason Bentley, art gallery L.A. Louver, and painter David Hockney makes more frequent use of illustration and hand-lettering. He created the main title typography and title design for the films The Fall, Immortals, and Mirror Mirror, all directed by Tarsem Singh.

He is the author of the book All Access – The Making of Thirty Extraordinary Graphic Designers. In her review of the book for Communication Arts magazine, editor Anne Telford said:

Using the symbology of rock 'n' roll to document the careers of 30 graphic designers—arbiters of style and chroniclers of popular culture—makes a lot of sense, coming from design dynamo and music fan Stefan Bucher. What distinguishes this book, and earns it its title, are the illustrated timelines of each designer's career from early misfires to industry accolades: an enticing look back before their careers had star wattage.

In 2004 the Art Directors Club of New York named Bucher one of their "Young Guns", honoring him as one of the leading creatives age 30 and under. He has been an active member of AIGA, having served as the vice-president of membership of the Los Angeles Chapter from 1999 to 2001 and as vice-president of event programming from 2001 to 2003. He is a frequent speaker on graphic design at schools and design organizations across the United States. His column ink & circumstance appeared in the pages of the now defunct "STEP inside design" magazine. His book The Graphic Eye – Photographs By Graphic Designers From Around The Globe was released in Europe by RotoVision S.A. and in the United States by Chronicle Books in October 2009.

In 2011 the online software training web site lynda.com produced an hour-long documentary on Bucher and his work as part of their creative inspirations series, entitled "Stefan G. Bucher, designer, Illustrator, and Writer". In the same year, Bucher designed a yeti character for Saks Fifth Avenue that was produced as a plush animal. In 2012 he wrote and illustrated the character's origin story for the book "The Yeti Story" published by HarperCollins. Saks adapted the plot and artwork of this book into their holiday store windows in 2013.

Bucher was the programing chair of the 2015 AIGA Design Conference in New Orleans, Louisiana.

=== Daily Monster ===
He is the creator of the online animation series Daily Monster. For 100 days he filmed himself drawing a new monster every night, based on random ink blots. Visitors then posted stories about each monster on the blog. The clips have been downloaded over a million times and are collected, along with selected stories, in the book 100 Days of Monsters with a foreword by Ze Frank. The series has been included in the prestigious Communication Arts Illustration and American Illustration annuals, and was the subject of the annual Fresh Dialogue event held by the New York chapter of the American Institute of Graphic Arts (AIGA) in May 2007. Variations of the Daily Monster clips appear on the relaunched TV show The Electric Company.

The last monster comes to life in the wee hours of the morning. Stefan Bucher squirts a dab of black ink onto paper. He hits it with a blast of compressed air. Twists the paper here and there. Soon, he sees it. A jawbone. He starts to draw. The splotch of ink grows wings, a ruffly tail. A beak like a toucan's protrudes – yellow, gargantuan, perverse. Then a reptile eye. Within seconds, all the monster trademarks are in place. [...] People wrote in stories about the monsters and constructed interconnected narratives around them. The monsters are Rorschach blots for Bucher, but they also become Rorschach blots for his viewers. People see what they are predisposed to see.

== Bibliography ==
- All Access – The Making of Thirty Extraordinary Graphic Designers. ISBN 1-59253-079-6.
- 100 Days of Monsters. ISBN 1-60061-091-9.
- The Graphic Eye – Photographs By Graphic Designers From Around The Globe. ISBN 978-0-8118-6903-4.
- You Deserve A Medal – Honors on the Path To True Love. ISBN 978-1-60106-126-3.
- 344 Questions: The Creative Person's Do-It-Yourself Guide to Insight, Survival, and Artistic Fulfillment. ISBN 978-0-321-73300-9.
- The Yeti Story. ISBN 978-0-06-223590-9
- Stefan G. Bucher's LetterHeads: An Eccentric Alphabet. ISBN 978-1-944700-49-2
