= Golden Apple Award (education) =

Awards given to educators in the United States

The Golden Apple Award is the name for several unrelated awards given to educators in various school districts in the United States.

== Georgia ==
In Georgia, the Golden Apple is a weekly award presented by American Broadcasting Company affiliate WJBF.

== Illinois ==
In Illinois, the Golden Apple award is presented to educators who have been nominated by their peers for have showcased excellence in teaching, or at school leadership in a principal position. The award has a three year cycle of one year doing high school educators, one year doing middle school educators, and one year doing elementary school educators. The most common educators to get the award are teachers in public schools located within the Chicago, however, over recent years there have been more rural educators from southern and western Illinois to receive the award.

The award also has a scholarship component to it that high school students, as well a underclassmen college students can apply for. In order to be considered for the award the applicant must have graduated from an Illinois high school, attend an Illinois college, major in education, and then commit to teaching five years in a school of need within the state Illinois. A school of need can be defined as any school in the state of Illinois that has a free and reduced lunch population of 30% or higher, or do not meet state standards for standardized testing.

== Wichita, Kansas ==
In Wichita, the Golden Apple Award is given by the ABC station affiliate, KAKE 10. It is given to teachers in the Pre K-12 grade levels.

== Florida ==
In Florida, Golden Apple Awards are presented to responsible teachers within various school districts throughout the state. Golden apple awards are often given to students with good grades, conduct, etc.

== Michigan ==
At the University of Michigan, the Golden Apple is an annual award presented to professors by the Universities' Hillel and Apple Inc. It was first awarded in 1990, and is solely nominated by the student body.

The recipient for 2009 was John U. Bacon. The recipient for 2010 was Christopher Peterson, PH.D. in Clinical and Social Psychology.

== New Jersey ==
At Rutgers New Jersey Medical School, the Golden Apple is a prestigious annual award presented to faculty, residents and administration by the medical students at NJMS. The award acknowledges and honors their hard work and dedication to the NJMS community.

== Washington ==
In Washington, the Golden Apple is presented by KCTS, the Seattle PBS network. The award recognizes individuals and programs making a dramatic difference in Washington state education in grades pre-K through 12. The award has been granted since 1992. Previous winners include Dennis Harper and 826 Seattle.

This awards initiative honors successful teaching models and programs among Washington state educators and the public at large. For the sixteenth year (2008), the Golden Apple Awards will honor a mix of ten individuals and school and community programs. Recipients were featured in a primetime special that will air on public television stations across the state and will receive a financial award.

== Grand Cayman, Cayman Islands ==
At St Matthews University, the Golden Apple is an annual award presented to one professor for excellence in teaching. Selection is by popular vote after appraising the professor's class, and is conducted amongst the entire student body of the school.
