= Nínive Clements Calegari =

Educator in the United States

Nínive Clements Calegari is an American educator, author, and nonprofit founder. Following ten years of classroom experience in public schools, she became an author and founded a national literacy program, 826 National. She also founded The Teacher Salary Project. She is the CEO of Enterprise for Youth, an organization that empowers young people to prepare for and discover career opportunities in the San Francisco area through a three-phase program model of job-readiness training, paid internships with college credit, and ongoing career development and networking support.

== Biography ==
For high school, Calegari went to Santa Catalina School and graduated in 1989, later going to Middlebury College to receive her bachelor's degree in 1993 and a Masters in Teaching and Curriculum from the Harvard Graduate School of Education in 1995. She worked at Leadership High School, San Francisco's first charter school, where she also was on the board of directors, and then taught in her family's hometown in Mexico.

Calegari was a co-founder of 826 Valencia in April 2002 and the founding executive director. The group and the seven other related chapters, including 826NYC, 826LA, 826 Seattle, (which later moved on to become The Greater Seattle Bureau of Fearless Ideas), 826 Chicago, 826 Ann Arbor, 826 Boston and finally 826DC, all of which are a part of 826 National (which she also co-founded and headed) are a group of non-profit writing centers for students ages 6–18. Subsequently, 826-like models have been duplicated in 40 places around the world, including in London, Dublin, and Mexico.

Calegari, along with Dave Eggers and Daniel Moulthrop, co-authored The New York Times bestselling book Teachers Have It Easy: The Big Sacrifices and Small Salaries of America's Teachers, published by The New Press in 2005. It argues that increasing teachers' salaries is a critical part of a vibrant and functioning society, and essential to ensuring US students receive education from quality teachers.

Calegari founded and is CEO of The Teacher Salary Project, a non-profit designed to build the political will necessary to transform how US society values effective teachers. The project uses film, social media, and the general public to communicate its mission. The Teacher Salary Project's film, American Teacher, held its first preview screening in May 2011 at the San Francisco International Film Festival. It was also featured in numerous other film festivals, including the United Nations Association Film Festival and Philadelphia International Film Festival. The film was produced by Calegari and Eggers, and directed and produced by filmmaker Vanessa Roth. The film is narrated by actor Matt Damon with music composed by San Francisco musician Thao Nguyen.

In 2008, Calegari was appointed by San Francisco Mayor Gavin Newsom to the San Francisco Arts Commission. She was on the board of Learning Points Associates (which later was merged with American Institutes of Research), as an advisor to the George Lucas Education Foundation., and then a board member for 18 Reasons.

In 2014, Calegari gave a TEDx talk at Santa Catalina School on the importance of valuing teachers. In 2015, Calegari and the Teacher Salary Project released two short films, Laney's story and Kory's story, which follow two teachers struggling to make ends meet on a teacher's salary. The two short films were featured in a video on ATTN: which received over 12 million views.

In 2018, Calegari was a Homework Hero on ABC-7 as part of Women's History Month for her work with 826 Valencia and 826 National.

In 2019, Calegari appeared on MSNBC to discuss the teacher's pay gap based on her work with The Teacher Salary Project.

== Awards ==
Calegari has been the recipient of a National Endowment for the Humanities Fellowship, the William Coe Award for study at Stanford University and the Andrew Mellon Fellowship. In 2007, Calegari received Edutopia's 2007 Daring Dozen award.

The Jim Henson Community Honor in 2010 was awarded to 826 National. Calegari was awarded the Hidden Villa Humanitarian Award, along with Dave Eggers, in September 2016. Calegari and Eggers were given the Jefferson Award for their work with 826 Valencia in November 2016.

In May 2019, she received an honorary doctorate from the University of San Francisco.

== Works ==
826 Valencia

- Kate and Charlie Gibson talk 'The Book Case' podcast and new writers Good Morning America, Feb 16, 2023
- Molding the Next Generation of Writers CBS, Jan 21, 2023
- CA “Megafloods” | Literacy with Dave Eggers & 826 Valencia KQED, Aug 19, 2022

American Teacher Act

- Lawmakers propose raising teachers' minimum salaries to $60K to stem 'mass exodus' ABC, Dec 14, 2022
- Could the U.S. Soon See a Federal Minimum Salary for Teachers? EdSurge, Dec 14, 2022
- Teachers In 6 States Will Get Raises. More Could Join Them The Teacher Salary Project, July 5, 2023
- Under a new federal bill, a minimum teaching salary of $60,000 The Educators Room, Dec 17, 2022
- A Note About The American Teacher Act McSweeney's, Dec 16, 2022
- Teachers Would Make At Least $60k Under New Federal Bill The Teacher Salary Project, Dec 15, 2022
- Congresswoman Wilson's Press Release The Teacher Salary Project, Dec 13, 2022
- Will the teacher pay gap be fixed on a federal or local level? MSNBC, March 27, 2019
- Why teachers’ salaries should be doubled — now The Washington Post, March 25, 2014
- 100 Stories of Impact - An Advocate for Teachers and Students Harvard Graduate School of Education

Other Work

- with Daniel Moulthrop and Dave Eggers (2006) [2005]. Teachers Have It Easy: The Big Sacrifices and Small Salaries of America's Teachers. foreword by Henry Louis Gates Jr. The New Press. ISBN 978-1-59558-128-0.
- Classroom Publishing: A Practical Guide for Teachers. Ooligan Press. 2010. ISBN 978-1-932010-28-2.
- with Dave Eggers (April 30, 2011). "The High Cost of Low Teacher Salaries". The New York Times.
- with Dave Eggers and Daniel Moulthrop (June 27, 2005). "Reading, Writing, Retailing". The New York Times. "Op-Ed" contribution.
- "Help the Teacher Salary Project Boost Our Profession". Edutopia. February 7, 2010.
- "Why teachers' salaries should be doubled -- now". March 25, 2014 – via The Washington Post.
- Calegari, Nínive (August 29, 2015). "Why do teachers need side jobs to pay bills?". San Francisco Chronicle.
- Be Honest: And Other Advice from Students Across the Country. The New Press. 2011. ISBN 978-1595586094 – via Amazon.
