= 826 Valencia =

Educational nonprofit organization

Coordinates: 37.759665°N 122.421509°W

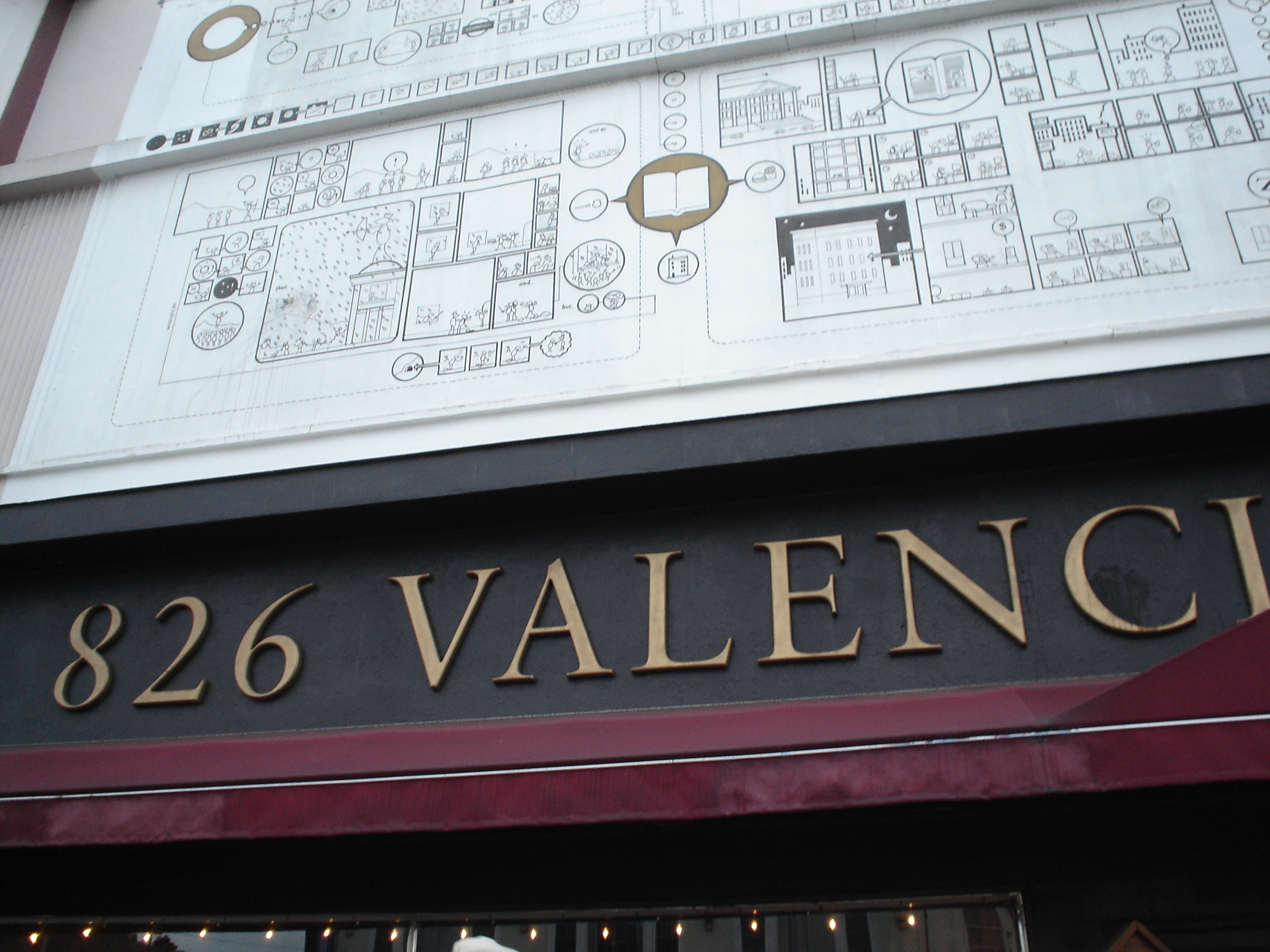
826 Valencia sign under a mural designed by cartoonist Chris Ware

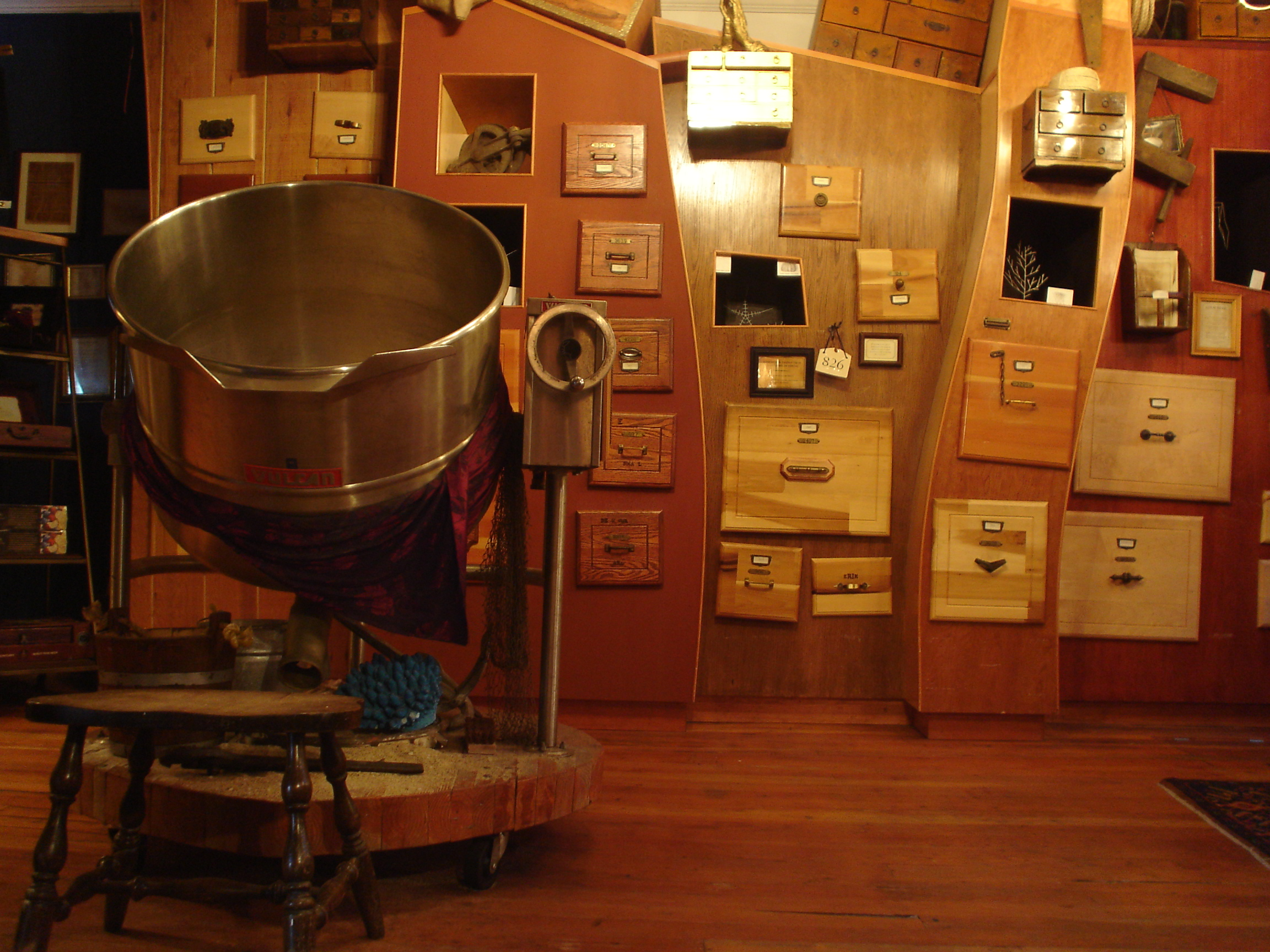
Inside

826 Valencia is a non-profit organization in the Mission District of San Francisco, California, United States, dedicated to helping children and young adults develop writing skills and to helping teachers inspire their students to write. It was the basis for the 826 National organization, which has centers on the United States with the same goal.

== Overview ==
Named for its street address, 826 Valencia was founded in 2002 by author Dave Eggers and veteran teacher Nínive Calegari, who both have ties to the literary and educational community. 826 consists of three centers, each encompassing a writing lab, a street-front student-friendly store that partially funds the programs, and two satellite classrooms in nearby middle schools. The organization is named after the street address of the first center.

Over 1,400 volunteers—including published authors, magazine founders, SAT-course instructors, and documentary filmmakers—have donated their time to work with thousands of students. These volunteers allow 826 Valencia to offer all of its services for free.

826 Valencia opened a second location in the Tenderloin in 2016 and another in the Mission Bay neighborhood in 2019.

== Programming ==
826 Valencia's programming includes-in-schools programs, workshops, field trips, after school tutoring and student publishing.

== Pirate supply store ==
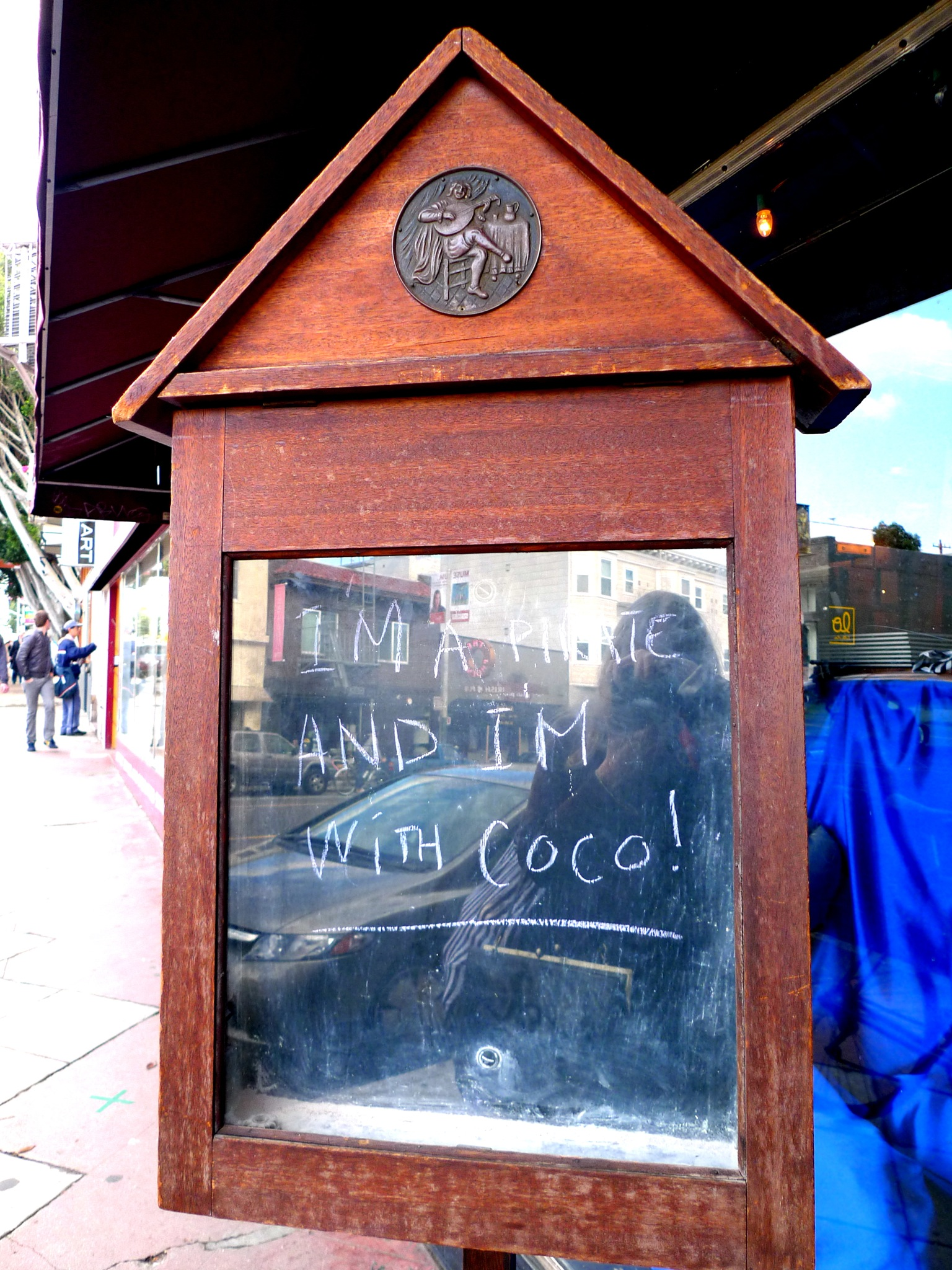
The storefront for 826 Valencia's pirate supply store with a sign reading "I'm a pirate and I'm with Coco!"

826 Valencia runs San Francisco's "only independent pirate supply store". The store is the front entrance of the tutoring center and has the look and feel of an authentic pirate shop. It sells pirate clothing, eyepatches, compasses, spyglasses, pirate dice, skull flags, and secret treasures. It features handmade signs, scattered around the store, offering tongue-in-cheek wisdom, such as "Uses for Lard" (#5: "Lard Fights") and "Guidelines for New Shipmates" (#4: "No forgetting to swab"). Unsuspecting visitors are sometimes treated to surprise "moppings."

Shoppers can also find back issues of McSweeney's Quarterly Concern, books published by McSweeney's, and literary compilations written by 826 Valencia students. The books of student writing published by 826 Valencia include forewords, illustrations and interviews from public figures such as Former San Francisco mayor Gavin Newsom and actor Robin Williams.

The Pirate Supply Store was originally created through necessity. After being turned down for regular use of church basements and school facilities, the founders discovered an empty store on Valencia Street. City ordinances required businesses in that area of the city to be either retail or catering, so the Pirate Supply Store was opened in 2002 as the "legitimate" business front for the writing center. It also helps fund the tutoring program.

== Mural ==
Dave Eggers commissioned cartoonist Chris Ware to design the mural for the facade of 826 Valencia's building. The mural depicts "the parallel development of humans and their efforts at and motivations for communication, spoken and written." The 3.9m x 6m mural was applied by artisans to Ware's specifications. Describing the work, Ware said "I didn’t want it to make anyone 'feel good', especially in that typically muralistic 'hands across the water' sort of way,"..."I especially wanted it to be something that people living in the neighbourhood could look at day after day and hopefully not tire of too quickly. I really hoped whomever might happen to come across it would find something that showed a respect for their intelligence, and didn’t force-feed them any 'message'."

== Influence ==
826 Valencia has inspired a number of other projects across the US, known as 'chapters'. In late 2004, just before the founding of four new chapters, 826 National was launched as an umbrella organization that provides logistical support to its chapters.

There are now nine chapters that make up 826 National: 826 Valencia, 826NYC in Brooklyn, 826LA in Los Angeles, 826CHI in Chicago, 826michigan (serving Ann Arbor, Detroit, and Ypsilanti), 826 Boston in Boston, 826DC in Washington, DC, 826 New Orleans, and most recently, 826 MSP in Minneapolis.

826 Valencia has also inspired similar projects in several countries. In 2018, twenty of these organisations from around the world formed the informal International Alliance of Youth Writing Centres, which has since welcomed many more into the ranks.

=== United States ===
- 826NYC, New York – opened 2004
- 826LA, Los Angeles – opened 2005
- The Greater Seattle Bureau of Fearless Ideas (formerly 826 Seattle), Seattle – Opened 2005, rebranded in 2014
- 826 Michigan, Ann Arbor, Michigan – opened 2005
- 826CHI, Chicago – opened 2005
- 826 Boston, Boston – opened 2007
- 826DC, Washington, D.C. – opened 2010, changed location and theme 2015
- Desert Island Supply Co., Birmingham, AL – opened 2012
- 826 New Orleans, New Orleans – opened 2018
- 826 MSP, Minneapolis – opened 2009, inducted into the 826 network in 2019

=== Canada ===
- Story Planet, Toronto – opened 2011

=== Italy ===
- La Grande Fabbrica delle Parole, Milano (MI) – opened 2009
- Porto delle Storie, Campi Bisenzio (FI) – opened 2014
- Fronte del Borgo, Torino (TO) – opened 2016

=== United Kingdom ===
- The Ministry of Stories, London – opened 2010
- Grimm & Co, Rotherham, Yorkshire – founded 2014
- Little Green Pig, Brighton and Hove – founded 2008
- The Super Power Agency, Edinburgh – founded 2016
- The Story Works, Dorset
- Fighting Words NI, Belfast – founded 2015

=== Australia ===
- Story Factory, Sydney – founded 2011
- 100 Story Building, Melbourne – founded 2010; centre opened 2012

=== Sweden ===
- Berättarministeret (Ministry of Tales) – founded in 2011 with several locations in the Stockholm area, and since 2017 one location in Gothenburg

=== Ireland ===
- Fighting Words, Dublin – opened 2009

=== Austria ===
- W*ORT, Lustenau – opened 2014

=== France ===
- Labo des Histoires, Paris – opened 2011

=== Netherlands ===
- Noordje, Amsterdam

=== Other ===
In April 2010, as an extension of the 826 Valencia scholarship program, Eggers launched ScholarMatch, a nonprofit organization that connects donors with students to make college more affordable.
