= The Greater Seattle Bureau of Fearless Ideas =

American nonprofit organization

Coordinates: 47.690071°N 122.35515°W

The Greater Seattle Bureau of Fearless Ideas (formerly 826 Seattle) is a nonprofit organization located in Seattle, Washington supporting students ages 6 to 18 with their creative and expository writing skills, and helping teachers.

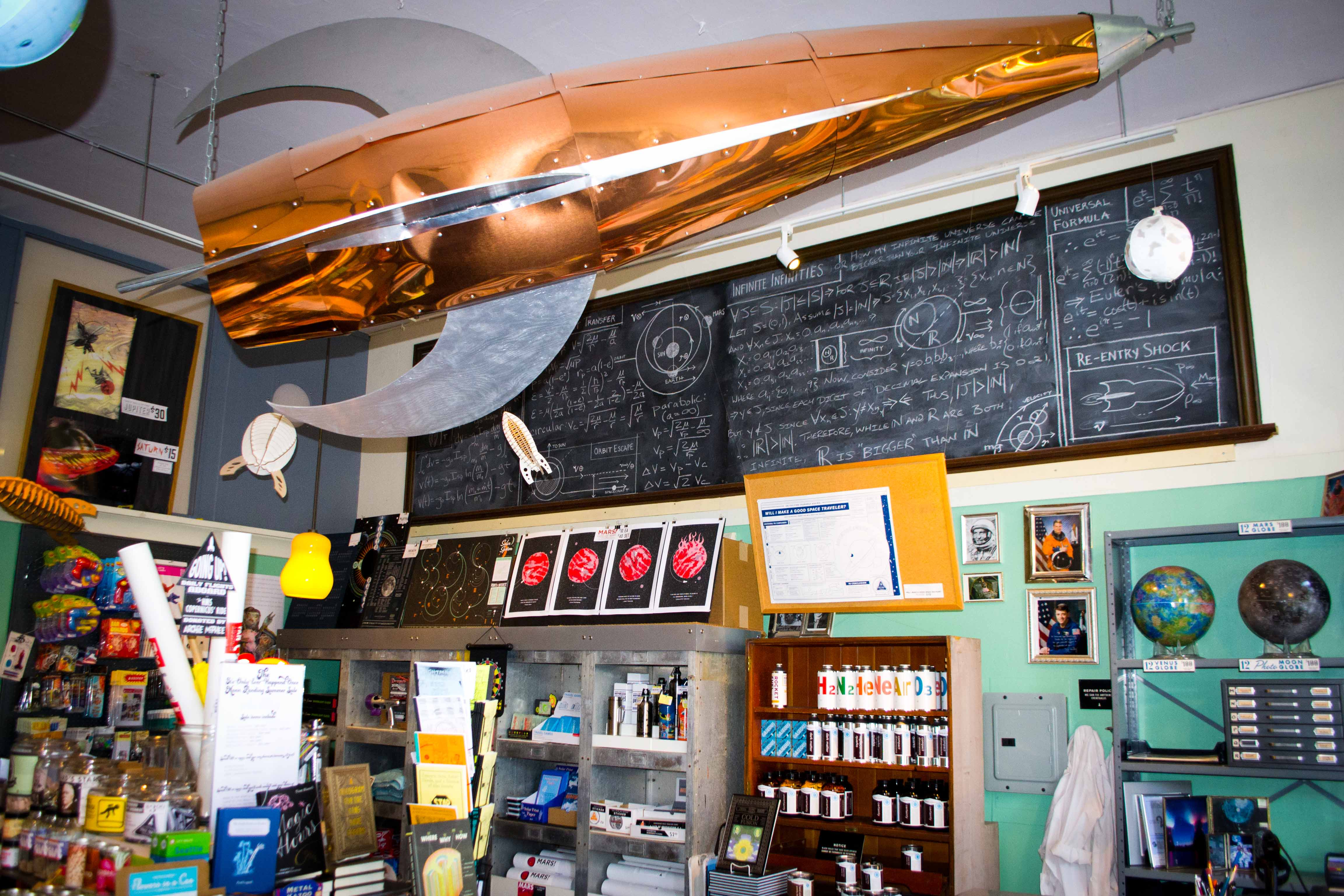
Greenwood Space Travel Supply Company, a novelty store managed by Bureau of Fearless Ideas, which is located behind the store.

Bureau of Fearless Ideas headquarters is located in the Greenwood neighborhood of Seattle. The organization manages a retail store at the location called the "Greenwood Space Travel Supply Company", which sells space-themed novelties and toys; the store's revenues benefit the organization. The organization was previously a part of 826 National prior to 2014.

In 2011 First Lady Michelle Obama presented the organization with one of 12 National Arts and Humanities Youth Program Awards, part of the President's Committee on the Arts and Humanities.

As of 2015, the Bureau employs David Schmader formerly of Seattle's The Stranger alt-weekly.
