= 826 National =

American nonprofit organization

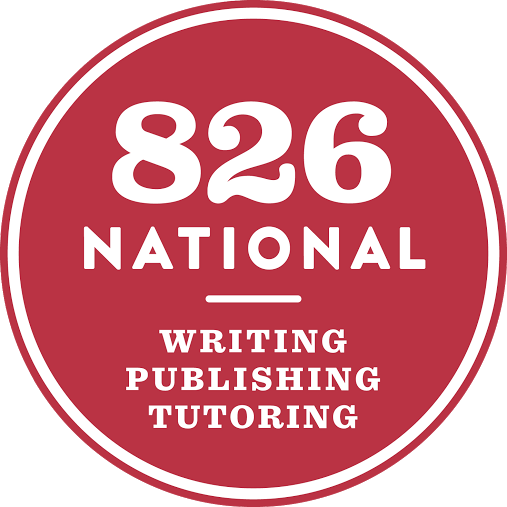
- Formation: 2002
- Founders: Nínive Clements Calegari and Dave Eggers
- Type: Non-profit organization
- Purpose: Education
- Headquarters: 44 Gough Street; San Francisco, CA 94110
- Location: 826 Valencia, 826NYC, 826LA, 826CHI, 826michigan, 826 Boston, 826DC, 826 New Orleans, 826 MSP
- CEO: Laura Brief
- Main organ: Advisory board
- Affiliations: ScholarMatch, McSweeney's
- Website: www.826national.org

826 National is an educational nonprofit organization. The organization's eight chapters include 826 Valencia in San Francisco, 826NYC in Brooklyn, 826LA in Los Angeles, 826CHI in Chicago, 826Michigan (serving Ann Arbor, Detroit, and Ypsilanti), 826 Boston in Boston, 826DC in Washington, DC, 826 New Orleans, and 826MSP.

== History ==
The flagship chapter of 826, 826 Valencia, opened in 2002, at 826 Valencia St. in the Mission District of San Francisco. The original address inspired the name 826 National. It was co-founded by educator Nínive Clements Calegari and author Dave Eggers.

Following the founding of 826 Valencia, 826NYC was formed in 2004. In 2005, 826Michigan, 826LA, and 826CHI were established, respectively. In 2007, 826 Boston joined, followed by 826DC, which opened in 2010.

In 2008, a national office was established to support the chapters and act as a central hub of the 826 network.

== Store themes ==
Each 826 National store has a themed retail outlet. These include:

826 Boston	Greater Boston Bigfoot Research Institute
826 Chicago	The Wicker Park Secret Agent Supply Company
826NYC	The Brooklyn Superhero Supply Company
826LA	The Time Travel Mart
826 Valencia	The Pirate Supply Store & King Carl's Emporium
826michigan	Liberty Street Robot Supply & Detroit Robot Factory
826 New Orleans	New Orleans Haunting Supply Co.
826DC	Tivoli's Astounding Magic Supply
826MSP	Mid-Continent Oceanographic Institute

The Greater Seattle Bureau of Fearless Ideas, formerly called 826 Seattle, operates the Greenwood Space Travel Supply Company.

== Volunteer network ==
Volunteers are trained by staff members for various areas of 826 programs: After-school tutoring, the Young Authors Book Project, field trips, in-school programs, and writing workshops. Volunteers can also help in administrative jobs, such as website maintenance and graphic design.
